= Galveston Bay Area =

Coordinates: 29°29′59″N 95°05′23″W

Bay Area Houston
- Region
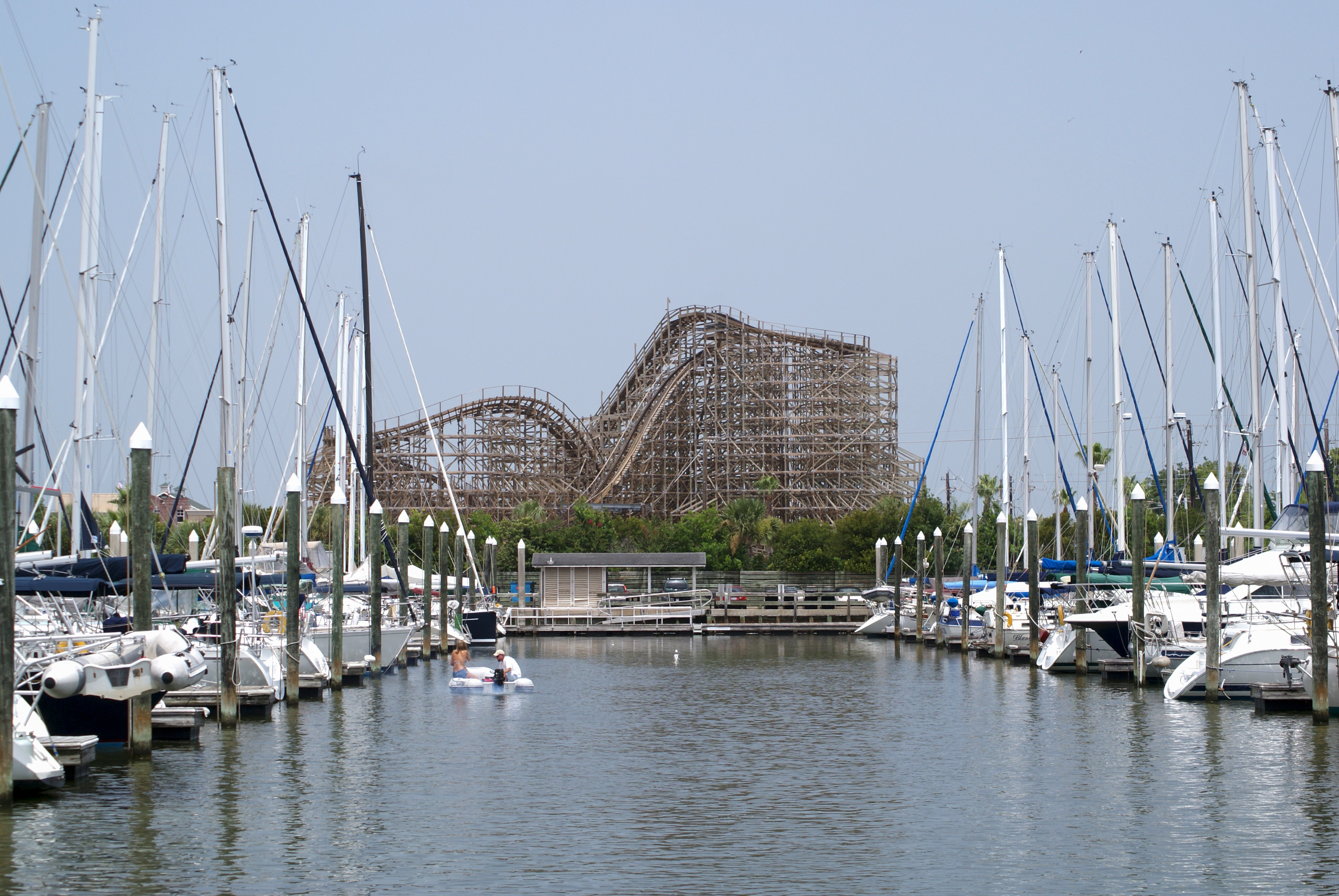
- Kemah boardwalk and marina

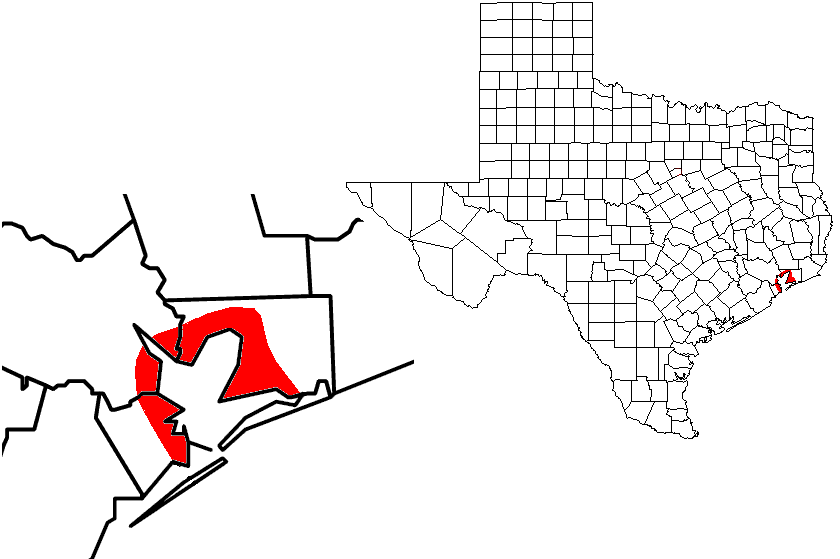
- Location of Bay Area within Texas
- Country: United States of America
- State: Texas
- Metro Area: Houston–The Woodlands–Sugar Land
- Named for: Galveston Bay
- Largest city: Pasadena
- Other cities: List: Baytown; Houston (partially)^{‡} ‡Clear Lake City Area; League City; Webster; Texas City; Anahuac

Population
  - Estimate (2000-2008): 566,850
- Time zone: UTC-6 (CST)
  - Summer (DST): UTC-5 (CDT)
- Website: www.bayareahouston.com

The Galveston Bay Area, also known as Bay Area Houston or simply the Bay Area, is a region that surrounds the Galveston Bay estuary of Southeast Texas in the United States, within the Houston–The Woodlands–Sugar Land metropolitan area. Normally the term refers to the mainland communities around the bay and excludes Galveston as well as most of Houston.

Originally part of the pirate kingdom of Jean Lafitte, this area played a role in the early history of Texas having been the site of some early rebellions against Mexican rule and the site of the victory of the Texas army over the Mexican army during the Texas Revolution. Ranching interests became early economic drivers around the bay. As the nearby cities of Galveston and Houston developed as commercial centers, the Bay Area communities became part of a principal commercial corridor between the cities.

The Bay Area is also the location of NASA's Lyndon B. Johnson Space Center which houses the Christopher C. Kraft Jr. Mission Control Center. The City of Houston's official nickname as "Space City" is derived from this. In addition, a large tourist attraction for area visitors is Space Center Houston.

The landscape around the bay features a mix of swamps, beaches, industrial facilities, tourist attractions, and historic sites. The area's developing population is ethnically diverse with a growing international community. The communities host cultural events ranging from ballet and musical theater to fairs and rodeos. The bay itself supports a commercial fishing industry and features one of the highest concentrations of marinas in the nation. On land the area holds numerous historic sites such as the San Jacinto Monument, and many parks and nature preserves such as the Armand Bayou Nature Center.

== Boundaries ==
The shores of Galveston Bay are home to many different municipalities and communities. The region is part of the larger Houston–Sugar Land–Baytown Metropolitan Area. Though the term Bay Area in its broadest sense refers to all communities near the shoreline, some sources, such as the Bay Area Houston Economic Partnership (BAHEP), use more limited definitions, often referring more specifically to the clusters of communities nearest to Houston.

=== Municipalities ===
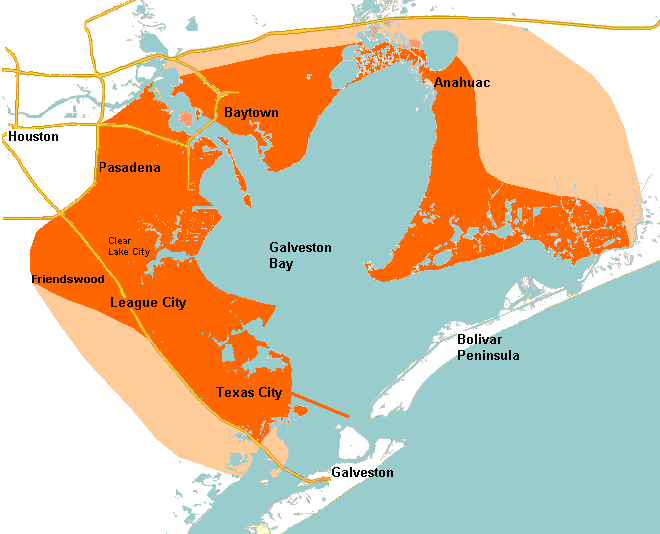
Map of the Bay Area

The following communities lie on the shores of Galveston Bay proper and Trinity Bay, the two main components of the Galveston Bay complex (excluding those along the Gulf of Mexico):

Anahuac, Bacliff, Baytown, Beach City, Kemah, La Porte, Morgan's Point, Seabrook, Shoreacres, Texas City

The BAHEP and the Clear Lake Area Chamber of Commerce (CLACC) include the following additional communities in their membership:

Clear Lake superneighborhood of Houston (which includes Clear Lake City and JSC), Clear Lake Shores, Deer Park, Dickinson, El Lago, Friendswood, League City, Nassau Bay, Taylor Lake Village, Webster.

Some additional communities such as La Marque, adjacent to Texas City, are treated as bayside communities by some sources.

=== Subdivisions ===
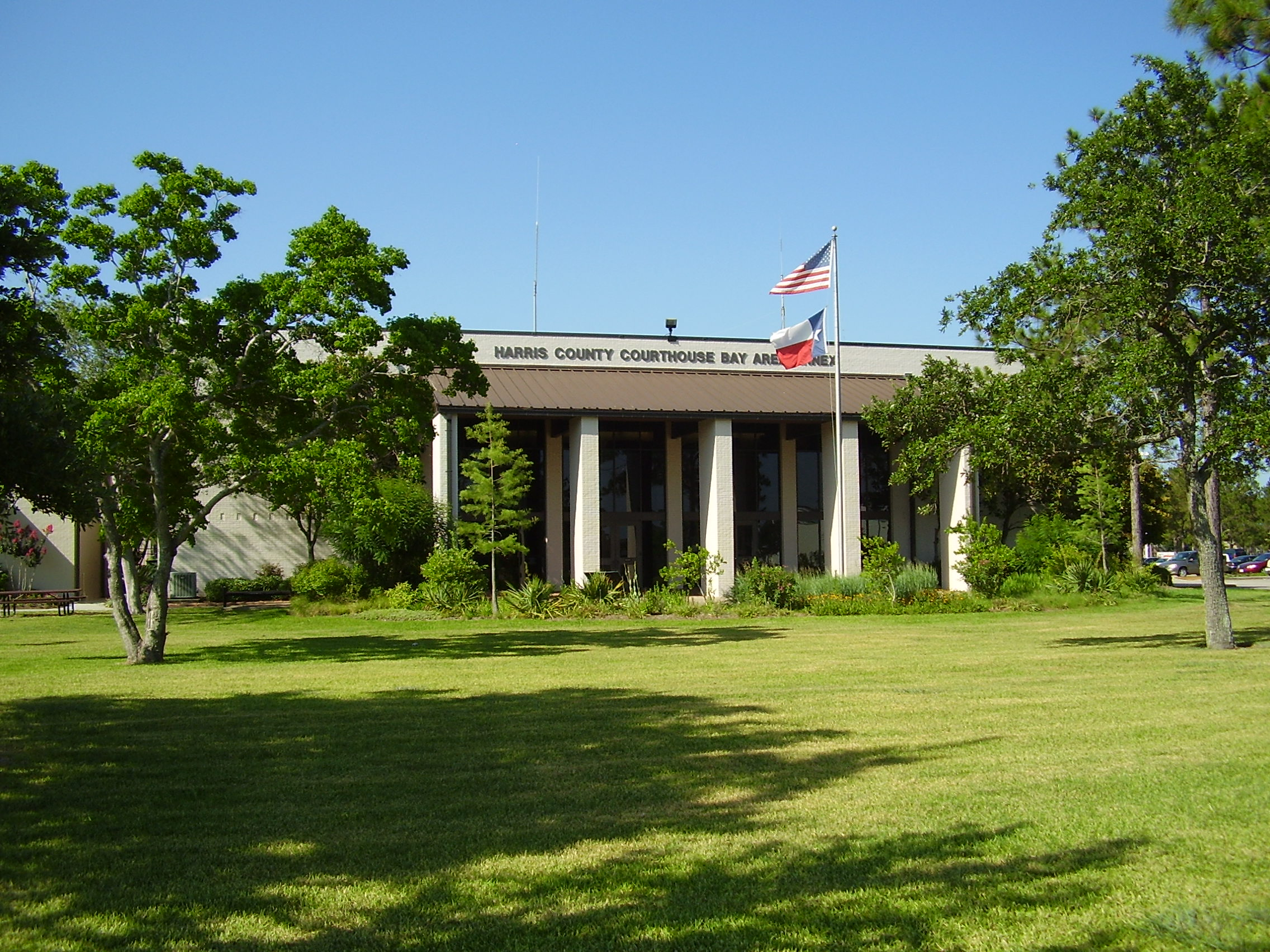
Harris County Courthouse Bay Area Annex

The Bay Area can be sub-divided based on the histories and economic connections of the different communities.

- The La Porte - Baytown area, including Deer Park and La Porte, straddles the Houston Ship Channel and has since the world wars been defined by the heavy industry along its shores. The two towns have distinct histories with Baytown having become tied to the oil industry earlier. But in modern times their fortunes have been closely tied by their cores of heavy industry.
- The Clear Lake Area includes numerous communities and municipalities surrounding Clear Lake between Houston and the bay. This area largely owes its recent growth and prosperity directly and indirectly to the Johnson Space Center, and has been traditionally characterized by a large white collar workforce and its prolific middle- and upper-middle-class neighborhoods. The area is sometimes seen as the heart of the Bay Area in spite of the relative youth of its history.
- The Texas City area includes Texas City and La Marque and surrounding communities. Until recently this area and Galveston together were treated by the federal government as a metro area distinct from Houston. The area's prosperity revolves around a great degree around the Port of Texas City and the heavy industry around it.
- The bayside region of Chambers County encompasses the shoreline of Trinity Bay (and East Bay), on the northeast side of the bay complex. This area includes Anahuac as its largest community. Some of the area remains semi-rural and oriented to agriculture and commercial fishing but petroleum and chemical processing are significant industries as well. Urban development is more limited giving the area a more small-town and rural atmosphere. This area's history is somewhat distinct from the other areas around the bay as it is not part of the once crucial commercial corridor between Galveston and Houston.

== History ==
=== Spain, Mexico, and the Republic of Texas ===
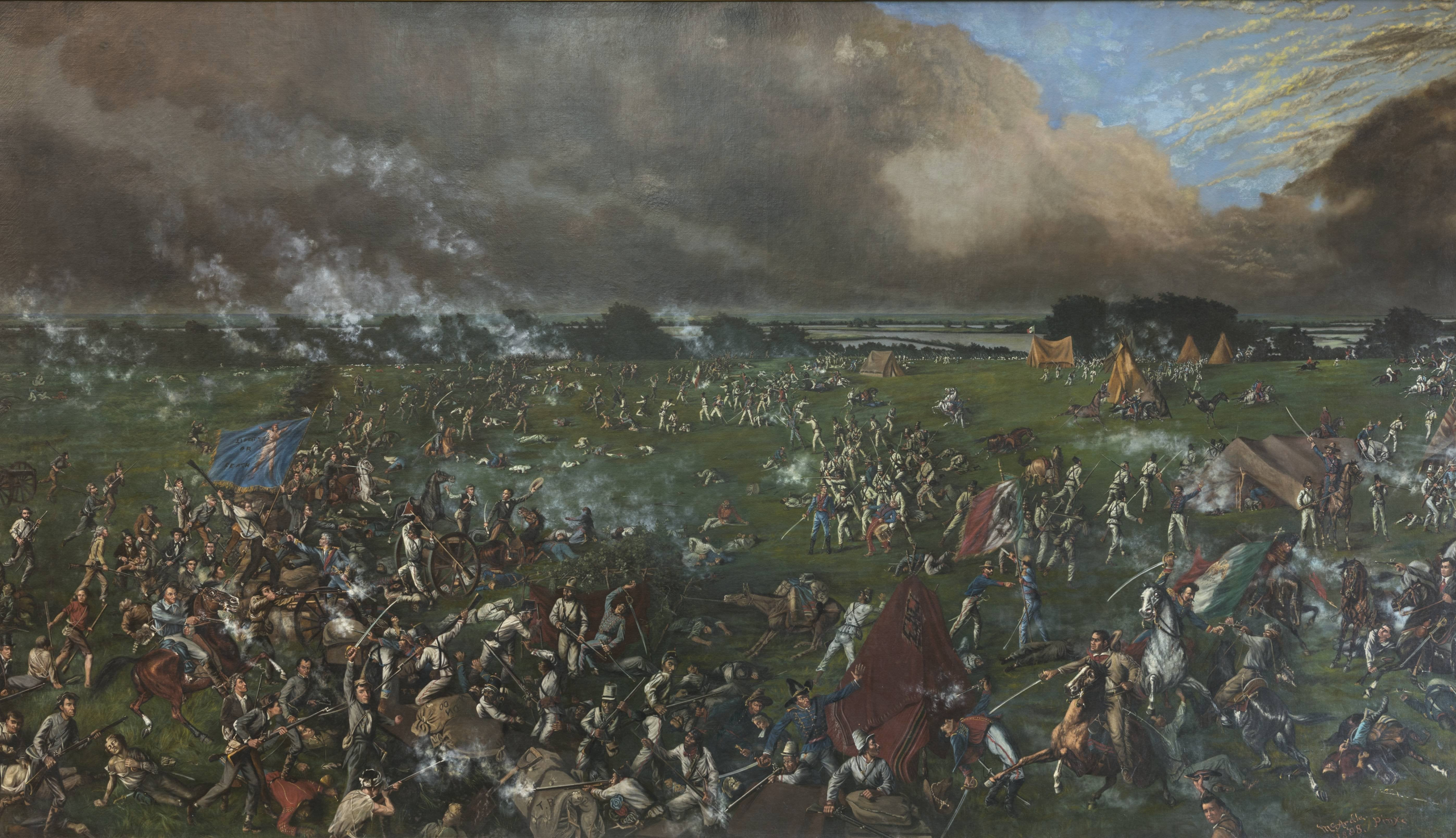
The Battle of San Jacinto-1895 painting by Henry Arthur McArdle

Prior to European settlement the area around Galveston Bay was settled by the Karankawa and Atakapan tribes, who lived throughout the Gulf coast region. Spanish explorers such as the Rivas-Iriarte expedition and José Antonio de Evia charted the bay and gave it its name. In 1816 the pirate Louis-Michel Aury established a settlement on Galveston Island but was soon succeeded by the pirate Jean Lafitte. Lafitte transformed Galveston and the bay into a pirate kingdom establishing bases and hide-outs at locations such as Trinity Bay, Clear Lake, and Eagle Point. In 1821, however, the United States Navy ousted Lafitte and the colony was largely abandoned.

Following its declaration of independence from Spain the new nation of Mexico moved to colonize its northern territory of Texas by offering land grants to settlers both from within Mexico and from the nearby United States. Small settlements such as Lynchburg and San Jacinto were gradually established around the bay and in 1830 Mexican authorities created a customs and garrison post at Anahuac commanded by Juan Davis Bradburn. Conflicts between Bradburn and the settlers in the region led to the Anahuac Disturbances, a prelude to the larger Texas Revolution that was to come. Following a coup in the Mexican government many freedoms previously enjoyed by the Texans were revoked causing Texas to revolt and declare its independence in 1835. After a number of battles the Texas army, under the leadership of General Sam Houston, finally defeated the Mexican Army in the Battle of San Jacinto, near modern Pasadena.

The new Republic of Texas grew rapidly. The shores of the bay were initially mostly home to farms and ranches such as the famed Allen Ranch. New communities such as Goose Creek (modern Baytown) were established.

=== U.S. annexation ===
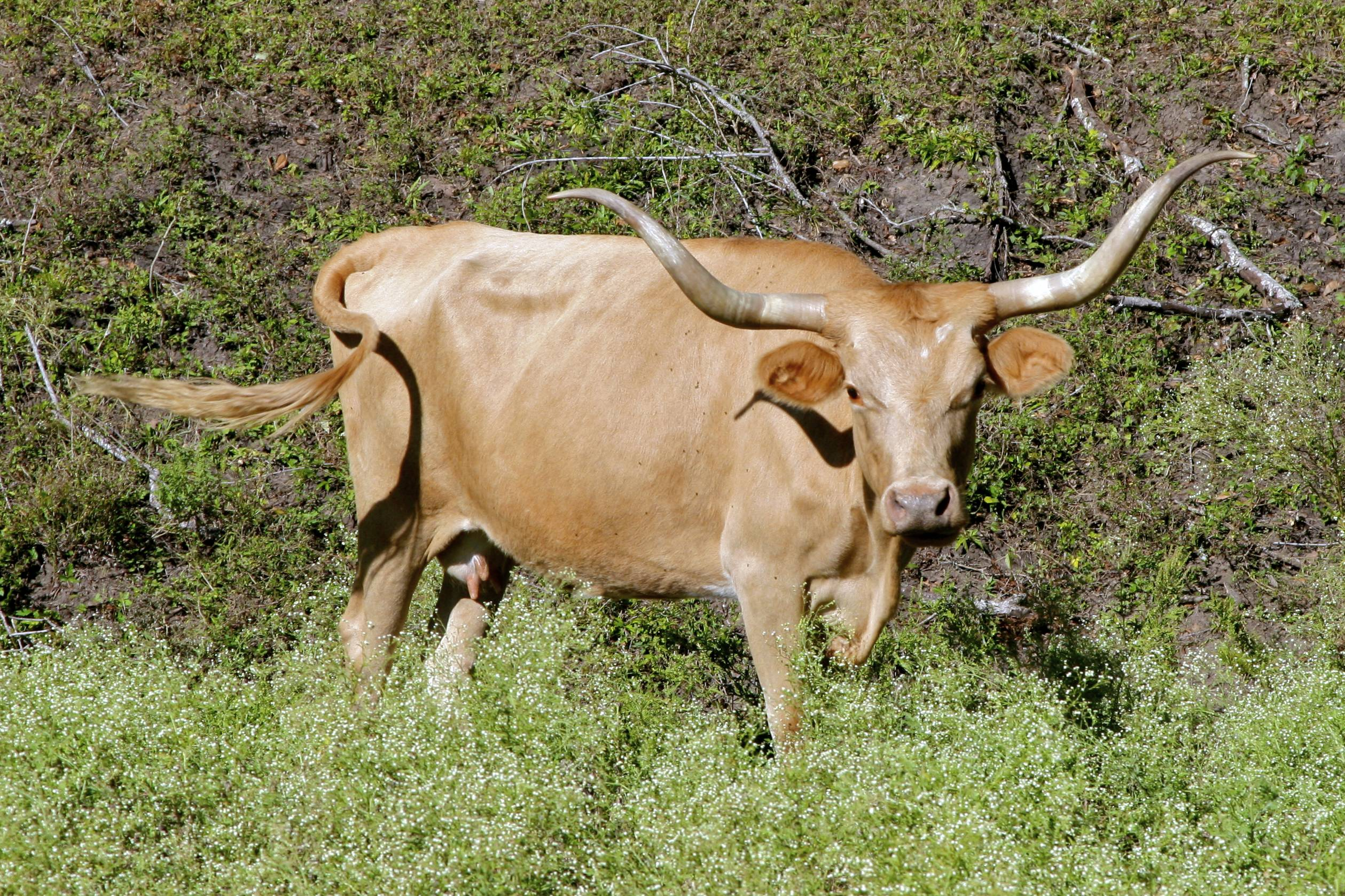
The Longhorn became an important economic resource.

Texas succeeded in its bid to join the United States in 1845 which helped launch the Mexican–American War. Texas' annexation brought more people to Texas and ranching interests around the bay began to grow. Throughout the 19th century Galveston remained Texas' dominant metropolis and the communities around the bay were strongly tied economically and culturally to the city though, as Houston began to develop, so did the Bay Area's ties to it. The construction of the Galveston, Houston and Henderson Railroad further spurred growth in the area.

During the American Civil War, during which Texas seceded from the United States, the area served a limited role in the conflict as new fortifications like Fort Chambers, near Anahuac, were constructed to ward off a mainland invasion by Union forces and to protect supply routes to and from Galveston. The Bay Area sat in the middle of the conflict as the most important battles in Texas occurred at Galveston with the conflict moving through the area on to Harrisburg and Houston after Galveston's fall.

In the aftermath of the war the Texas economy declined for a period. Nevertheless, ranching interests became major economic drivers in the area spawning many other economic enterprises such as hide processing plants and shipping concerns. The success of these enterprises and the growth of Galveston as one of the prime commercial centers in the South and Southwest helped promote the construction of the Gulf, Colorado and Santa Fe Railway; and the La Porte, Houston and Northern Railroad through the area over the course of the 19th century. These railroads running along the southwest shore of the bay would spawn new communities such as Clear Creek (League City), Webster, and later Texas City. Some of these new communities would develop initially as stop-over points for travelers on the rail lines. Toward the end of the century, as ranching's profitability declined, many communities turned increasingly to agriculture. The farming community of Pasadena was established during this time.

The Galveston Hurricane of 1900 devastated the city of Galveston and heavily damaged communities around the bay (according to some estimates the Bay Area death toll may have been as high as 2000). Bridges between Galveston and the mainland were destroyed. Communities along the shoreline declined for some time as economic growth moved inland and Houston became the dominant economic center in the region. The region received a population boost from some Galveston refugees who relocated to the mainland following the catastrophe.

=== 20th century ===
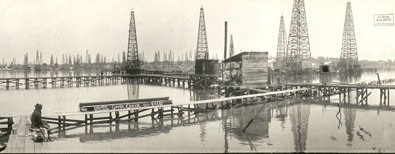
The Goose Creek oil field in 1919

The sparsely populated Bay Area transformed during the 20th century. Following the hurricane, donations by the newly established Red Cross helped revive area farming communities. The newly established community of Texas City opened its port and railroad junctions shipping cotton and grain. Commercial fishing, particularly for oysters and shrimp, grew as a significant area industry.

In the early 1900s the Goose Creek Oil Field was discovered launching an oil boom at Galveston Bay. In 1915 Goose Creek acquired the first offshore oil drilling site in the state and soon after refineries opened in Texas City, Baytown and Pasadena. The Humble Oil refinery in Baytown became the largest in the Houston area. The wealth brought on by the boom transformed the region and population surged. Manufacturing and refining expanded rapidly. During the Roaring 20s, tourism and resort communities developed around Clear Lake and the bay shoreline in communities such as Morgan's Point, Seabrook, Kemah.

The World Wars created new manufacturing opportunities for factories around the bay and the area's population grew even faster than Houston. Ellington Air Force Base was built becoming a major air field and flight training center during the wars.

After the war area economic diversification brought on by the war effort helped in the transition to a peacetime economy. NASA's Johnson Space Center was established in 1963 helping to spur explosive growth in the mid-20th century, especially the 1970s and 1980s. The remainder of the communities on the southwestern shore urbanized and development connected the area to Houston. Tourism and recreation re-emerged and blossomed particularly around the Clear Lake area and the nearby shoreline.

Hurricane Ike struck the Bay Area in 2008 causing substantial damage both environmentally and economically, the most destructive event since 1900. As of 2009 a proposal to build a levee system, the Ike Dike, to protect the bay is under discussion.

== Geography ==
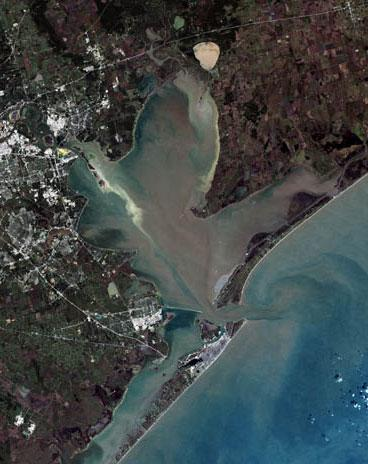
A simulated-color image of Galveston Bay

The Galveston Bay Area is located on the gulf coastal plain, and its vegetation is classified as temperate grassland and marshes. The municipalities have been built on reclaimed marshes, swamps, and prairies, which are all still visible in undeveloped areas. Flatness of the local terrain and proximity to the Bay and the Gulf have made flooding a recurring problem for the area. The region once relied on groundwater for its needs, but land subsidence has forced much of the region to turn to ground-level water sources.

=== Geology ===
The land beneath the Bay Area consists of layers of sand and clay to great depths. These layers were created by millennia of river-borne sediments which gradually incorporated plant and animal matter creating the petroleum deposits for which the Gulf Coast is known.

The region has numerous faults, many considered active, but none has produced significant earthquakes in recorded history. These faults tend to move at a smooth rate in what is termed fault creep, which reduces the risk of an earthquake.

=== Bay and coastline ===
Galveston Bay is an estuary along the Texas Gulf Coast. The bay as a whole is composed of four major sub-bays: Galveston Bay proper, Trinity Bay, East Bay, and West Bay. Other smaller bays and lakes connecting to this complex of waterways in the Bay Area include San Jacinto Bay, Burnet Bay, Scott Bay, Crystal Bay, Goose Lake, Clear Lake, Dickinson Bay, and Moses Lake.

Galveston Bay is mostly shallow with an average depth of 7–9 feet. It is fed by the Trinity River and the San Jacinto River, numerous local bayous and incoming tides from the Gulf of Mexico. This unique and complex mixing of waters from different sources supports many types of marine life including crabs, shrimp, oysters, and many varieties of fish thereby supporting a substantial fishing industry. Additionally the system of bayous, rivers, and marshes that ring the Bay support their own ecosystems allowing for diverse wildlife and enabling freshwater farming of crawfish. The areas near the bay shore in fact have a higher diversity of habitats than the nearby Gulf coast.

Although contaminants from the major industrial complexes along the bay contribute substantially to bay pollution, most is the result of storm run-off from various commercial, agricultural, and residential sources. In recent decades, conservation efforts have been enacted which have improved water quality in the bay.

=== Climate ===
League City

Climate chart (precipitation, max. and min. temperature)
J	F	M	A	M	J	J	A	S	O	N	D
4.8 64 46	3 67 50	3.3 73 56	4.2 78 61	5.1 85 69	6.5 89 74	4.4 91 76	6.6 92 76	7.3 88 72	5.8 81 63	4.5 72 53	4.5 66 47
- █ Average max. and min. temperatures in °F
- █ Precipitation totals in inches
- Source: The Weather Channel: Monthly Averages for League City, TX (77573)
Metric conversion
J	F	M	A	M	J	J	A	S	O	N	D
122 18 8	77 19 10	84 23 13	107 26 16	130 29 21	166 32 23	111 33 24	169 33 24	186 31 22	147 27 17	115 22 12	115 19 8
- █ Average max. and min. temperatures in °C
- █ Precipitation totals in mm

The Bay Area's climate is classified as humid subtropical (Cfa in Köppen climate classification system). Spring supercell thunderstorms sometimes create tornados (but not to the extent found in Tornado Alley). Prevailing winds from the south and southeast bring heat from the deserts of Mexico and moisture from the Gulf of Mexico.

Summer temperatures regularly exceed 90 °F (32 °C). The area's proximity to the bay and the winds that it generates moderate the area's temperatures and ease the effects of the humidity creating a more pleasant climate than inland communities like Houston (e.g. the average July high in Texas City is 89 °F (32 °C) with 9.8 mph (15.8 km/h) winds vs. 94 °F (34 °C) with 6.7 mph (10.8 km/h) winds in Houston). Winters in the area are temperate with typical January highs above 60 °F (16 °C) and lows are near 40 °F (4 °C). Snowfall is rare. Annual rainfall averages can range from 50 to 64 inches (130 to 160 cm) depending on the community.

Excessive ozone levels can occur due to industrial activities; nearby Houston is ranked among the most ozone-polluted cities in the United States. The industries located along the ship channel and the bay are a major cause of the pollution.

Hurricanes are a substantial concern during the fall season. Though Galveston Island and the Bolivar Peninsula provide some shielding, the Bay Area still faces more danger than Houston and other inland communities, particularly because of storm surge.

Climate data for League City, Texas (Houston NWSO), 1991-2020 normals
Month	Jan	Feb	Mar	Apr	May	Jun	Jul	Aug	Sep	Oct	Nov	Dec	Year
Mean daily maximum °F (°C)	64 (18)	67 (19)	73 (23)	78 (26)	85 (29)	90 (32)	92 (33)	92 (33)	88 (31)	82 (28)	73 (23)	66 (19)	79 (26)
Mean daily minimum °F (°C)	46 (8)	50 (10)	56 (13)	61 (16)	69 (21)	74 (23)	76 (24)	76 (24)	72 (22)	63 (17)	53 (12)	47 (8)	62 (17)
Average precipitation inches (mm)	4.80 (122)	3.02 (77)	3.30 (84)	4.22 (107)	5.12 (130)	6.54 (166)	4.36 (111)	6.64 (169)	7.34 (186)	5.79 (147)	4.54 (115)	4.53 (115)	60.20 (1,529)
Source: NOAA

== Economy ==
The Bay Area has a diverse economy with much of it built around aerospace, petrochemicals, and high tech industries. The region's economy is closely tied to the rest of the Houston area though the mix of local businesses is somewhat unusual. In 2005, the median household income for the Clear Lake area was $62,061 compared to $50,868 for the Houston area as whole and $45,472 for all of Texas.

=== Overview ===
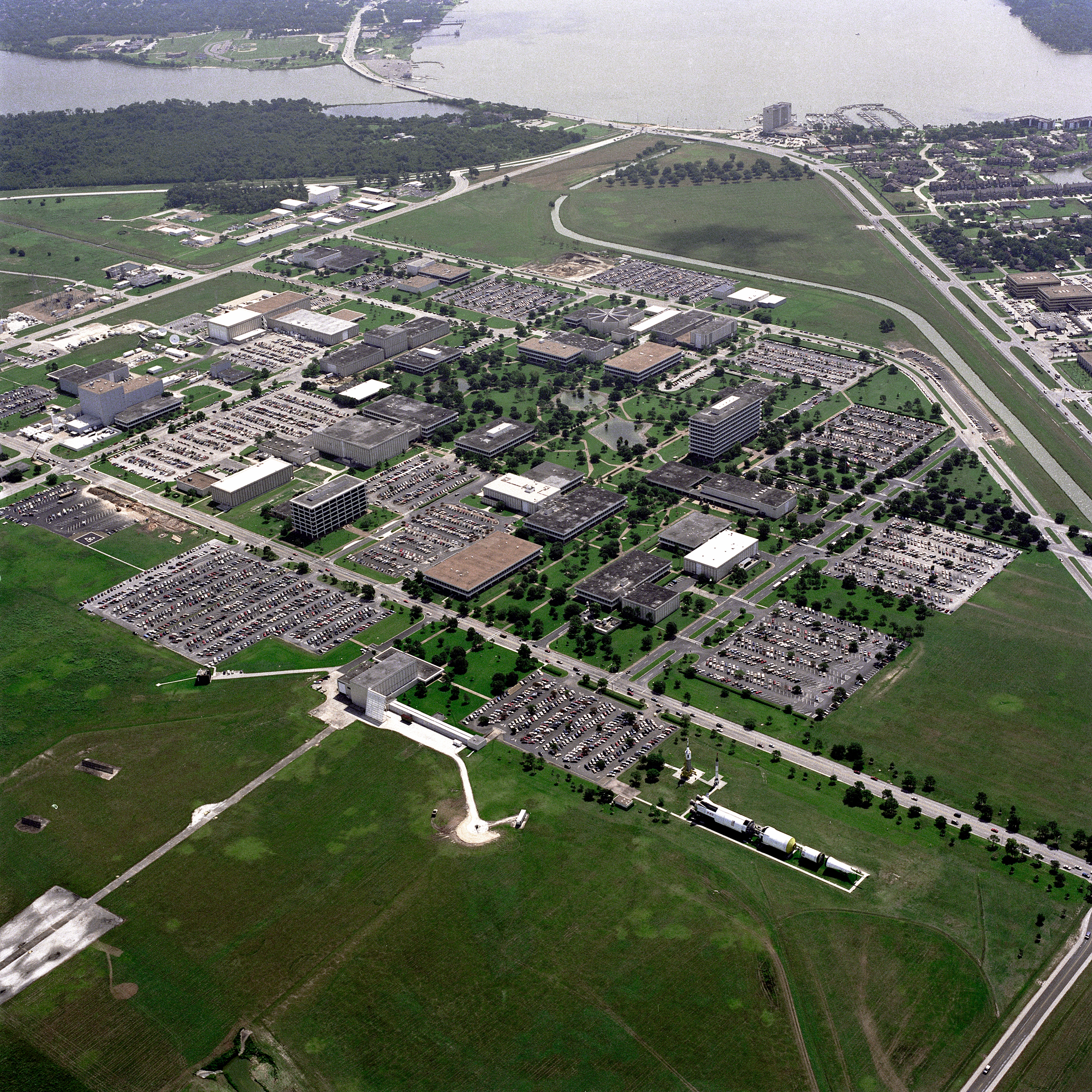
Aerial view of the NASA's Johnson Space Center with Clear Lake in the background

The Bay Area's four major employment sectors are aerospace, petrochemicals and chemical processing, high-tech (software, biotechnology, electronics, etc.), and tourism. Most other employment in the region is supported by these industries although some smaller, independent industries exist as well.

The most widespread economic activities in the area revolve around petroleum and petrochemicals, largely centered in Baytown, Pasadena/La Porte, and Texas City. These industries in Houston and the Bay Area account for nearly half of the U.S. petrochemical manufacturing and approximately one third of the U.S. petroleum refining capacity. The Bay Area is home to the largest refineries and petrochemical complexes in the Greater Houston area and to the majority of the processing capacity.

NASA's Johnson Space Center (JSC) is an important pillar of the Bay Area economy. Businesses around this core include a broad range of high-tech development enterprises from aerospace engineering to software and electronics.

The tourism industry attracts millions of visitors each year with attractions ranging from Space Center Houston to the bay itself. Ecotourism, in particular, is a growing sector with destinations such as the Armand Bayou Nature Center. Biotechnology, which already employs nearly 3000 workers in the area, is a smaller but growing industry in the area enabled in large part by JSC and the Texas Medical Center in Houston. Commercial fishing is one of the older industries in the region and is still a significant economic sector.

Some outlying areas around the bay, particularly to the northeast side, remain semi-rural. Cattle ranching and agriculture remain staples of some local economies as well as shrimp fishing and oyster farming.

=== Economic hubs ===
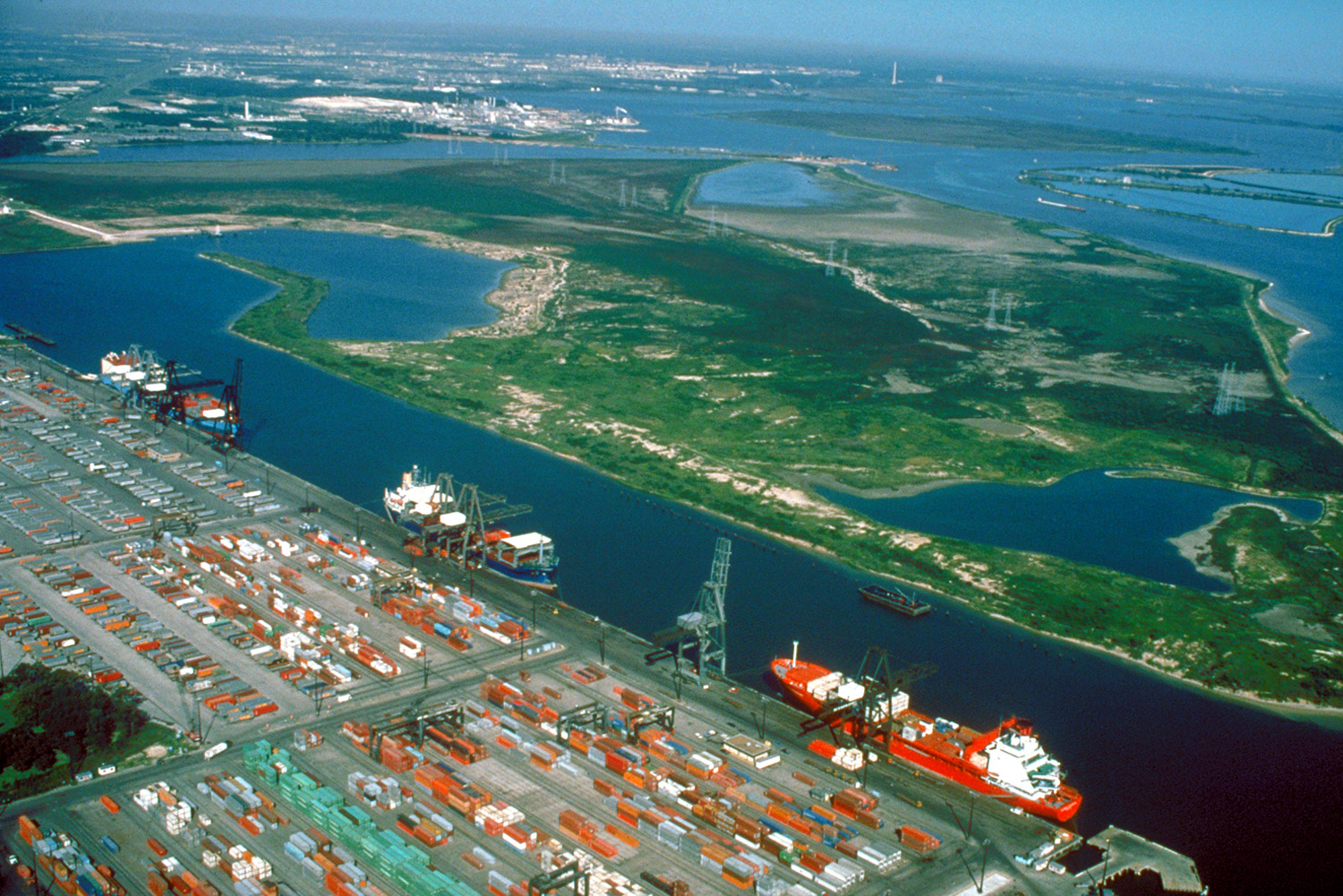
The Barbours Cut Container Terminal

Major Bay Area economic hubs include the following:

- Bayport Industrial District - A large complex of chemical processing facilities comprising 57 companies with a business impact of over $829 million.
- Johnson Space Center - A major NASA center and its main hub for human spaceflight activities, this site manages more than $4 billion annually in aerospace contracts, and together with numerous private companies involved in space programs and related ventures gives the Bay Area one of the highest concentrations of aerospace businesses and expertise in the nation. Additionally, JSC's research in bioastronautics has helped create a growing biotechnology industry in the area. The Galveston Bay area is home to 92% of the Houston-Galveston area aerospace jobs.
- ExxonMobil Baytown Complex — One of the world's largest petrochemical industrial complexes, this complex is Baytown's largest employer and one of the largest in the area. For its part the Baytown Refinery located on this site is the largest refinery in the United States and is capable of processing 572,000 barrels of oil per day.
- Texas City Industrial Complex — This petrochemical complex includes the BP Texas City Refinery, the state's second largest.
- Barbours Cut Terminal - This shipping terminal, the largest of the terminals operated by the Port of Houston Authority, handles in excess of 3 million tons of cargo annually.
- Ellington Airport - This mixed-use (military-civilian) airport is part of the Houston Airport System and home to the 147th Reconnaissance Wing of the Texas Air National Guard. The airfield has traditionally been a major contributor to the local economy though government realignments have scaled back the base's military role through the years.

== Demographics ==
Demographic Statistics
Community	Total population	Median household income	% White	% African American	% Asian
Anahuac	2210	$40,924	68.3%	20.2%	0.7%
Bacliff	6962	$32,188	97.8%	1.8%	3.0%
Baytown	78,311	$48,398	64.1%	17.0%	2.0%
Beach City	1645	$70,104	96.0%	1.6%	0.0%
Clear Lake-Houston	43,141	$68,815	77.8%	4.7%	11.4%
Clear Lake Shores	1205	$67,500	94.9%	3.3%	7.5%
Deer Park	28,520	$61,334	90.0%	1.3%	1.3%
Dickinson	17,093	$41,984	72.3%	10.5%	1.2%
El Lago	3075	$66,223	94.5%	7.8%	1.4%
Friendswood	38,327	$91,887	86.0%	1.9%	6.4%
Kemah	2330	$51,620	75.4%	3.8%	3.5%
La Marque	13,682	$34,841	55.8%	34.7%	0.5%
La Porte	31,880	$55,810	81.4%	6.3%	11.3%
League City	70,657	$80,432	82.6%	6.5%	5.0%
Morgan's Point	332	$57,917	88.7%	4.5%	0%
Nassau Bay	4170	$57,353	89.6%	1.9%	3.9%
Pasadena	151,960	$46,760	64.1%	1.8%	2.0%
San Leon	4365	$31,687	80.4%	0.8%	7.6%
Seabrook	9443	$54,175	88.9%	2.1%	3.3%
Shoreacres	1488	$71,985	94.15%	1.01%	0.94%
Taylor Lake Village	3694	$99,535	92.4%	2.7%	2.1%
Texas City	44,765	$43,078	62.4%	28.2%	1.1%
Webster	9083	$42,385	64.9%	9.0%	5.7%
Total	566,850	$56,827	72.9%	8.3%	3.9%

Home to a diverse set of communities, the Bay Area has a demographic distribution that varies greatly among these individual communities. Based on data from the U.S. Census Bureau and the City of Houston (2008, where available, and 2000 otherwise), the area demographic statistics are as follows (see table for more details). The total population was approximately 566,850. The median household income was $56,827. The white population was 72.9%, the African American population was 8.3%, and the Asian population was 3.9%.

The most populous community in the region is Pasadena (though Houston is a much larger city, the portion within this region is smaller than Pasadena). Taylor Lake Village has (by far) the highest median household income; and Bacliff and San Leon have the lowest. Texas City and La Marque have the largest African-American populations. La Porte and the Clear Lake area of Houston have the largest Asian populations.

== Education ==
=== Colleges and universities ===
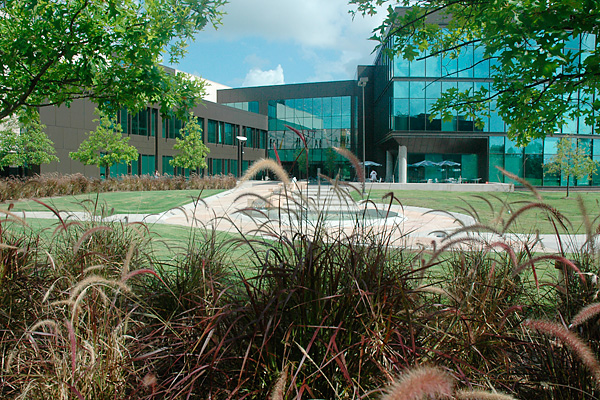
University of Houston–Clear Lake

The Bay Area contains several institutions of higher education. The largest is the University of Houston–Clear Lake (UHCL) located adjacent to Clear Lake City. UHCL is separate and distinct from the University of Houston (UH), but it is part of the larger University of Houston System. The university offers a wide spectrum of programs including what it touts as the most complete biotechnology graduate programs in the state.

Texas Chiropractic College in Pasadena, one of two schools of chiropractic in Texas and one of a handful in the nation, provides training for students from around the state. Several community colleges serve communities in the area as well, including San Jacinto College, College of the Mainland, Lee College, and Houston Community College.

=== Primary and secondary schools ===
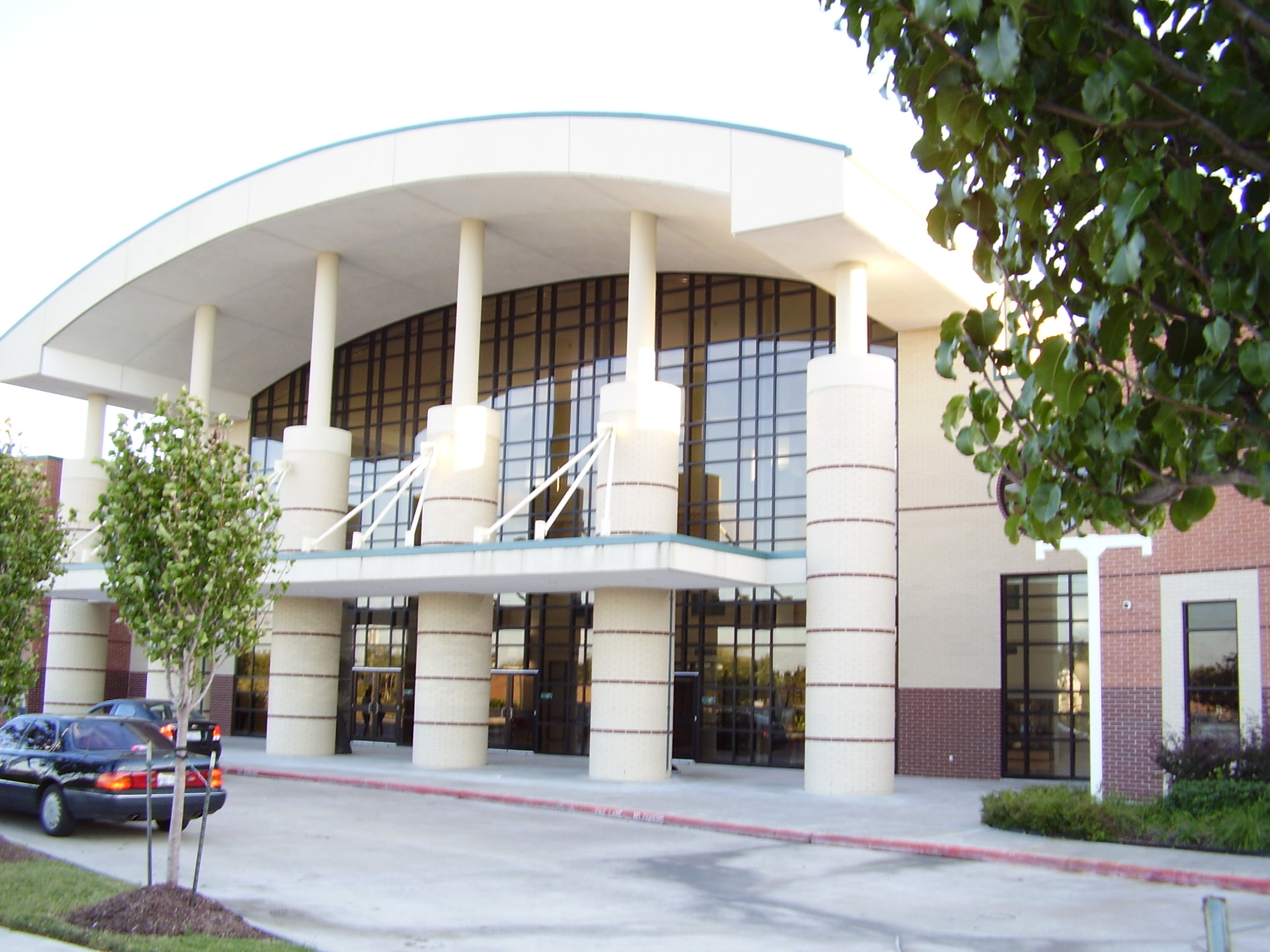
Pasadena Memorial High School

The Bay Area covers multiple municipalities with multiple school districts. Most of the communities in the Clear Lake Area are served by Clear Creek Independent School District though some nearby areas are served by Dickinson and Houston Independent School Districts. Communities in the Pasadena/Baytown area are served by Deer Park, Goose Creek Consolidated, La Porte, and Pasadena Independent School Districts. The Friendswood area is served by the Friendswood Independent School District. The Texas City area is served by La Marque and Texas City Independent School Districts. The communities in Chambers County near Anahuac are served by Anahuac Independent School District and Barbers Hill Independent School District.

As of 2009 these 11 districts, excluding Houston ISD, have a total of 190 primary and secondary schools. Of these Clear Creek, Deer Park, Goose Creek, Barbers Hill and Anahuac ISD were evaluated as "recognized" districts (the second highest ranking) by the Texas Education Agency, or TEA. All of the others were evaluated as "academically acceptable" with the exception of Texas City ISD, which was evaluated as "academically unacceptable".

67 (35%) of the schools were ranked as "exemplary" (the highest ranking); 62 (33%) were ranked as "recognized"; 39 (21%) were ranked as "academically acceptable"; 2 (1%) were ranked as "academically unacceptable"; and 20 (11%) were not rated by the TEA. Notably 100% of Friendswood ISD schools and 65% of Clear Creek ISD schools were "exemplary", the highest percentages of these 10 districts. Overall, of the schools that were rated, 37% of the schools in these 10 districts were "exemplary", compared with 29% for the entire state.

== Transportation ==
The Bay Area Houston Transportation Partnership (BayTran) coordinates planning for the transportation needs of the Bay Area. Collaborative efforts by the local communities have helped push forward development of regional infrastructure.

=== Ground transportation ===
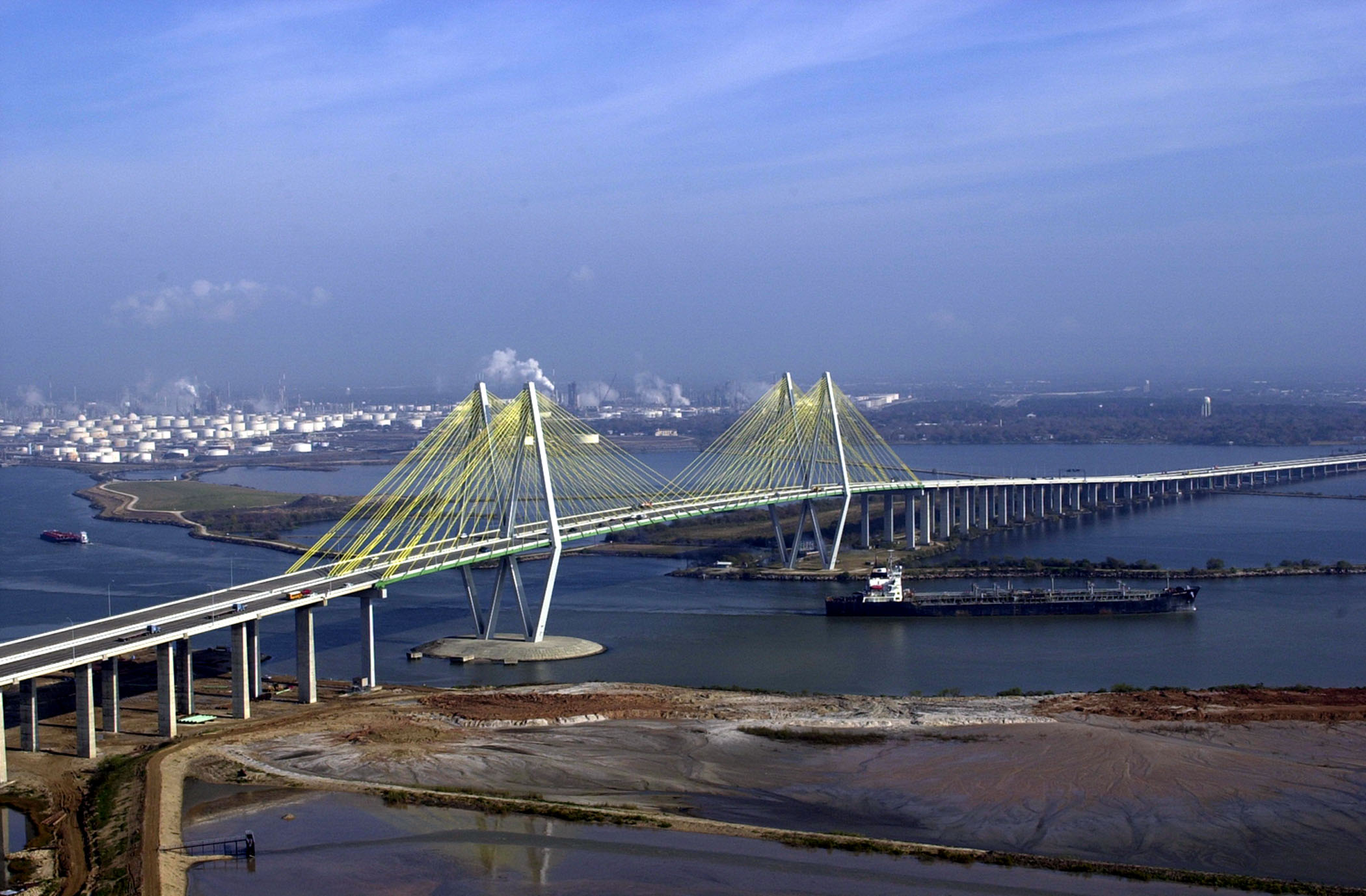
Fred Hartman Bridge connecting Baytown and La Porte

The Bay Area's two interstate freeways act as linear backbones connecting the communities on either side of the ship channel. The few other freeways in the region provide access into the centers of heavy industry within the region. Connectivity within other communities mostly relies on uncontrolled surface highways.

Interstate 45 (the Gulf Freeway) is the major freeway for the core areas of the Bay Area linking them with Houston and Galveston. Highway 146 (Bayport Blvd.) is a coastal highway linking the waterfronts of the communities. The Gulf Freeway and Bayport Blvd. together are the main arteries linking the Clear Lake Area communities and Pasadena, though Highway 225, East Beltway 8, Highway 3 and others are important as well. The Fred Hartman Bridge on Highway 146 crosses the ship channel connecting Baytown and La Porte, while the Galveston Causeway on the Gulf Freeway crosses the bay connecting Texas City and Galveston Island.

In the outlying north Bay Area, Interstate 10 links Anahuac and other communities nearby connecting them to Houston and the rest of the Bay Area. Highway 124 provides access to the Bolivar Peninsula.

The Houston Metro bus system provides service to the southeast Houston and Pasadena connecting the communities with central Houston. The remaining communities in the Bay Area communities are not served by mass transit. Greyhound Bus Lines, which provides service to cities nationwide, has stations at Baytown and La Marque/Texas City.

=== Air travel ===
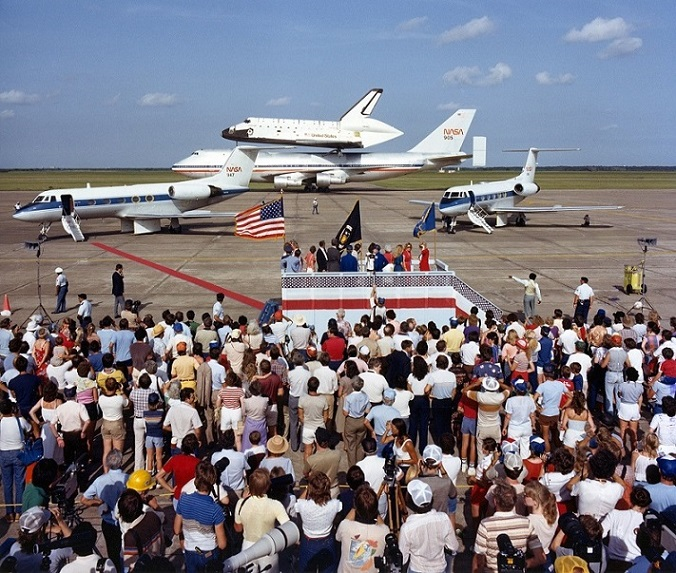
Space Shuttle Challenger at Ellington Field in 1982

Houston Hobby Airport (HOU) is the nearest airport providing regular domestic service. It is in southeast Houston near the Bay Area and provides service to U.S. destinations. International service is provided by Bush Intercontinental Airport (IAH) in north Houston.

Ellington Airport, the other branch of the Houston Airport System (HAS), is a mixed-use airport. It acts as a reliever airport for Hobby, in addition to use by NASA, the military, and public aviation. The system has performed significant expansion of the airport in recent years expecting significant growth in its usage in coming years. La Porte Municipal Airport in Pasadena and Chambers County Airport near Anahuac provide public air access to their respective communities.

=== Shipping ===
For seagoing shipping the Barbours Cut and Bayport terminals (administered by the Port of Houston Authority), and the Port of Texas City are the major freight shipping points. For railway shipping the Union-Pacific Webster station, the Union-Pacific Deer Park station, the Union-Pacific Baytown station, and the Texas City Terminal Railway Company, are major access points.

== Healthcare and medicine ==
Bay Area Houston Healthcare Network hubs
Provider	Location
Bayshore Medical Center	Pasadena
CHRISTUS St. John Hospital	Houston-Clear Lake
Clear Lake Regional Medical Center	Webster
Devereux Texas Treatment Network	League City
M.D. Anderson Clinical Care; Center - Bay Area	Nassau Bay
Memorial Hermann Southeast; Hospital	Houston
Moody Health Center	Pasadena
Texas Oncology	Webster
Eye Clinic of Texas	League City
University of Texas; Medical Branch	Galveston

The Bay Area Houston Healthcare Network (BAHHN) is a collaboration of health care providers coordinating health care services in many of the west bay communities and Galveston. The hubs of the network include Memorial Hermann Southeast Hospital in the Clear Lake City area, Bayshore Medical Center in Pasadena, and the University of Texas Medical Branch in Galveston.

Numerous other health care facilities exist in the region as well. Notable facilities outside the area covered by BAHHN include San Jacinto Methodist Hospital (Baytown) and Mainland Medical Center (Texas City).

== Culture ==
The Bay Area is a racially and ethnically diverse region. The industrial centers of Pasadena and Baytown in particular have large international communities. Multicultural events such as the Grito Fest (Baytown) celebrate the area's diversity.

Many other annual events take place in the Bay Area as well. The Strawberry Festival in Pasadena celebrates the role the iconic fruit played in rescuing the town's economy following the 1900 Hurricane. The Blessing of the Fleet boat parade in Kemah is an annual event that celebrates Kemah's history as a shrimp fishing town. The Gulf Coast Film Festival annually showcases independent films from local, regional and international artists in various categories ranging from short films to documentaries. Other annual events include the Wings over Houston Air Fest (Ellington Field), the Music Fest by the Bay (Texas City), the Ballunar Festival, the Oak Tree Festival (League City), and the South Shore Dockside Food & Wine Festival (League City). In Anahuac the annual Gatorfest celebrates the semi-rural culture of Chambers County. And, of course, in the spirit of the state to which the area belongs, the annual Pasadena Livestock Show and Rodeo features traditional rodeo events for area spectators.

=== Arts and theatre ===
The Bay Area has a substantial community of artists and artistic programs. The Bay Area Houston Ballet and Theatre group and the League City Ballet offer performances in genres ranging from ballet to American musicals. The Clear Lake Symphony, the Pasadena Philharmonic Orchestra, and the Baytown Symphony Orchestra offer multiple performances each year ranging from classical to "pops" performances.

Other arts and theatre programs exist in the area as well. The Arts Alliance at Clear Lake, a group of 50 area arts organizations, regularly schedules arts exhibits, musical performances, and other arts programs. Community theater groups such as the Pasadena Little Theatre, the Clear Creek Country Theatre (Nassau Bay), the Harbour Playhouse (Dickinson), and the Baytown Little Theater offer a variety of regularly scheduled performances. Regular free concerts and other cultural events take place in venues such as the Pasadena Fairgrounds and League Park Plaza (League City).

=== Parks and landmarks ===
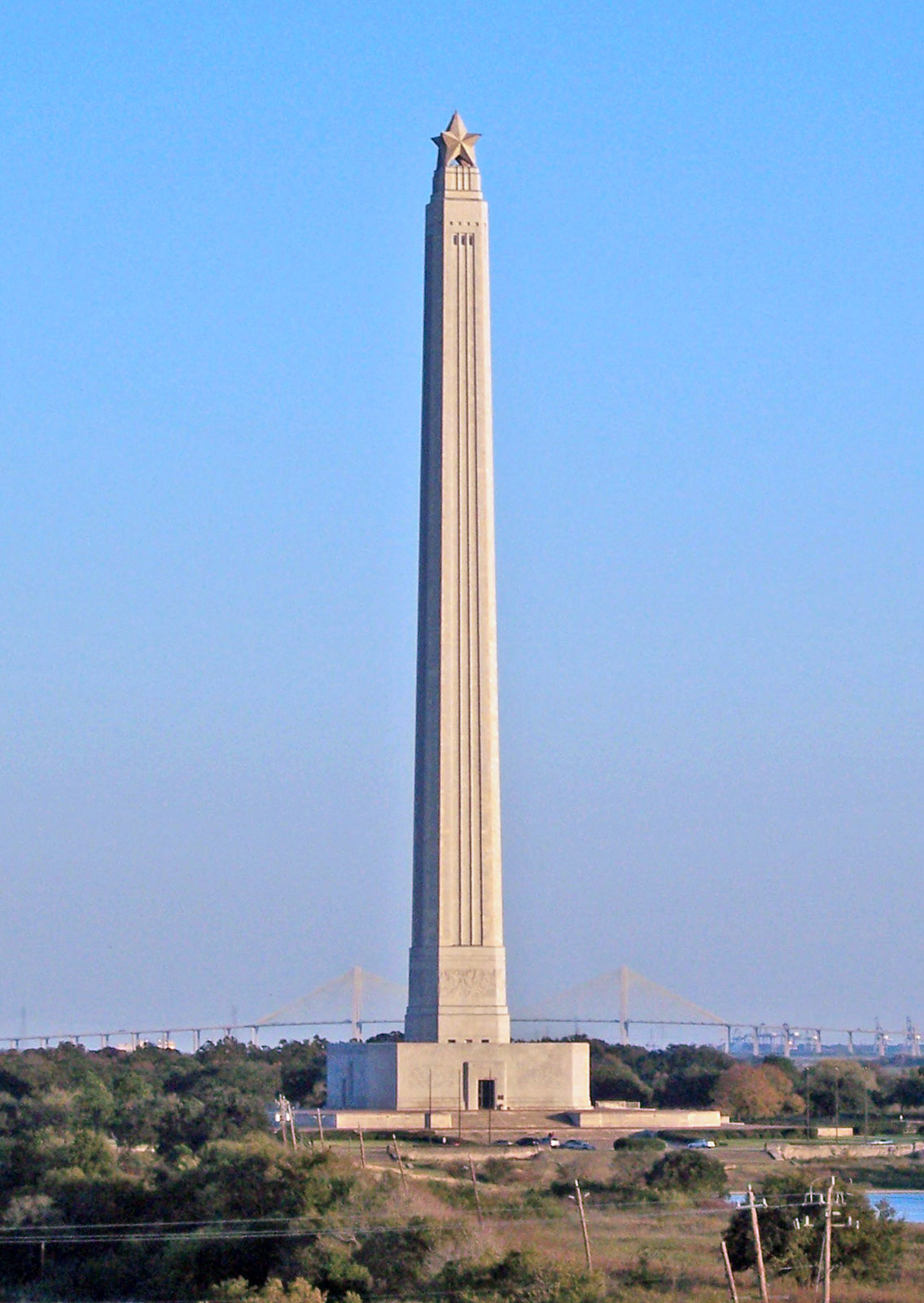
San Jacinto Monument

The Bay Area contains parks and landmarks. One of the oldest landmarks is the San Jacinto Battleground State Historic Site in La Porte which marks the site of the Battle of San Jacinto and holds the San Jacinto Monument and the USS Texas. Nearby, the Sterling Mansion, a former Governor's residence at Morgan's Point, marks the edge of the former Gold Coast of Texas.

The Armand Bayou Nature Center in Pasadena is the largest urban wilderness preserve in the nation. It features a boardwalk through the marshes, numerous nature trails, and boat tours offering views of natural habitats for animals ranging from bison to seagulls to butterflies. The Baytown Nature Center, located on two peninsulas along the ship channel, and the Texas City Prairie Preserve, located along Moses Lake and the bay, are largely undeveloped nature preserves with views of wetlands and coastal wildlife in addition to a variety of park facilities. The Seabrook Trail System which includes Robinson and Pine Gully parks offers primitive access to natural habitats for numerous species. These sites are all part of the larger Great Texas Coastal Birding Trail.

Further from the core on the northeast side of the bay sits the Jocelyn Nungaray National Wildlife Refuge (formerly the Anahuac NWR), a 34,000-acre (140 km^{2}) federal nature preserve. The coastal habitats in the park offer opportunities for viewing species ranging from the American alligator and bobcat to bird species such as the fulvous whistling-duck and the yellow rail.

Other major area parks include Clear Creek Nature Park (League City), Chandler Arboretum (Baytown), Challenger 7 Memorial Park (Webster), and Sylvan Beach Park (La Porte).

=== Urban attractions ===
Space Center Houston is the tourist arm of the Johnson Space Center and one of the most visited tourist attractions in Texas. Visitors can tour the Space Center grounds, view space capsules and artifacts, and find numerous educational activities including an IMAX theater.

The Kemah Boardwalk is a waterfront attraction featuring a variety of rides, restaurants, shops, and other entertainment venues. It is next to the Kemah Marina and hosts annual events such as the Boardwalk Wine Festival.

The Eddie V. Gray Wetlands Education and Recreation Center in Baytown offers indoor and outdoor educational exhibits featuring wetlands wildlife and habitats. The exhibits range from aquariums to science labs. The site also includes hiking trails through primitive habitats.

Museums in the area include the San Jacinto Museum of History, the Bay Area Museum (Seabrook), the Pasadena Historical Museum, the West Bay Common School Museum (League City), the Baytown Historical Museum, the Texas City Museum, the Buttler Longhorn Museum (League City) and the Dickinson Railroad Museum.

Farmers markets in the area, including the Nassau Bay Farmers Market and the Farmers Market at Clear Lake Shores, provide opportunities for area residents to connect with local growers, producers, and other businesses. Historic districts such as the Goose Creek Historic District (Baytown), the Morgan's Point Historic District, and the League City Historic District are available providing views of early area architecture in addition to unique shopping venues.

The area contains many marinas for boating and fishing enthusiasts such the Bayland Park Marina (Baytown) and the Watergate Yachting Center (Clear Lake Shores). The shoreline of Clear Lake itself has the greatest concentration of recreational boats in Texas and ranks third nationwide (Watergate even claims to be the nation's largest).

=== Sports ===
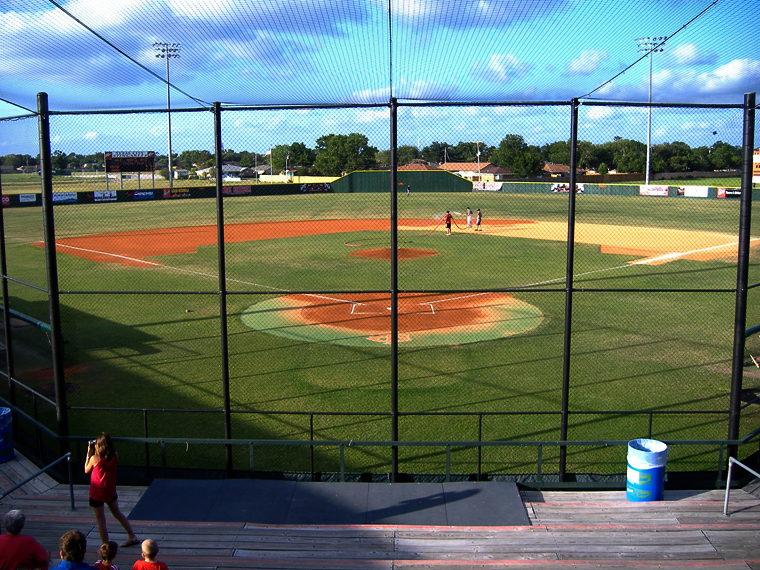
Robinson Stadium in Texas City

The Bay Area Toros are the area's minor-league baseball team. The Toros play their home games at Robinson Stadium in Texas City. The Texas City Rangers are a minor-league basketball team that plays its home games at La Marque High School. The Houston Raceway Park in Baytown holds regular drag racing and speedway motorsport events through the year. The park has a seating capacity of 30,000 with VIP suites.

The Galveston Bay Cruising Association holds regular regatta events on the bay such as the Bay Cup (Lakewood Yacht Club, Seabrook) and the Performance Cup. The 2009 season had 22 events throughout the year offering entertainment for sportsmen and spectators. The Gulf Greyhound Park in LaMarque is a stadium complex offering dog racing exhibitions. The park is the largest of its kind and features the state's largest restaurant among its amenities.

=== Media ===
Major daily newspapers serving the area include the Galveston County Daily News, the Baytown Sun, and the Houston Chronicle. Several smaller local newspapers serving the communities are available including the Bay Area Observer, the Bay Area Citizen, the Pasadena Citizen, and the Deer Park Progress. The Bay Area Observer, Bay Area Houston Magazine and the Bay Area Houston .Directory are online publications providing area interest stories and information.

The area receives many radio stations including some licensed within the area, such as KKBQ (country, Pasadena), KWWJ (gospel, Baytown), and KFTG and KLVL (Spanish religious, Pasadena). Among the many television stations received in the area stations licensed in the area include KUBE-TV (TuVisión, Spanish language, Baytown).

== See also ==
- Greater Houston
- Galveston Bay
- Hurricane Ike
- Lyndon B. Johnson Space Center
- Port of Houston
- Port of Galveston
