= Clear Lake, Texas (disambiguation) =

Clear Lake, Texas can refer to:

- Clear Lake, Texas, a town in North Texas
- Clear Lake (Galveston Bay), a lake near Houston
- Clear Lake City (Greater Houston), a master-planned community that lies within Houston and Pasadena, Texas
- Clear Lake Shores, Texas
- Clear Lake (region), the cluster of communities surrounding Clear Lake
