= David Michael Moses =

Catholic priest and social media influencer (1994)

The Reverend David Michael Moses
- Born: 1 December 1993 (age 32); Nassau Bay, Texas, U.S.
- Education: University of Houston–Clear Lake (BA)
- Occupation: Priest
- Organization: Roman Catholic Archdiocese of Galveston–Houston

YouTube information
- Channel: Father David Michael Moses
- Genre: Religion
- Subscribers: 443K
- Views: 103,137,821 million
- Last updated: July 11, 2026
- Website: fatherdavidmichael.com

David Michael Moses (born 1 December 1993) is an American Catholic priest and social media influencer.

== Early life and education ==
Born in Nassau Bay, Texas, Moses' parents are converts to the Catholic Church; his father was previously Lutheran and his mother a Baptist.

Moses began college at age 14. At age 18, he received a Bachelor of Arts in Humanities from the University of Houston–Clear Lake. After applying to law school, he decided to pursue ordination instead and enrolled at St. Mary’s Seminary in the Archdiocese of Galveston–Houston.

While a seminarian, Moses formed a musical group to perform charity concerts to raise funds for "women in crisis pregnancies" in Texas, an effort which continued after his ordination and which has generated approximately $640,000 as of 2024.

== Career ==
Moses was ordained in 2019. He later founded Pilgrim Rosary, a prayer app. Moses was the parochial vicar of St. Faustina Catholic Church in Fulshear, Texas, from July, 2019 to July, 2022. He was then transferred to Christ the Good Shepherd Church in Spring, Texas, where he was parochial vicar until a second transfer in July 2025. As of October 2025, he was the pastor of Christ Our Light Catholic Church in Navasota, Texas, and St. Stanislaus Kostka Catholic Church in Anderson, Texas.

Moses creates religious content on TikTok, YouTube, and on Instagram where he enjoys his largest following, having reached a million followers in March 2025. He began posting religious content to social media in 2020, approximately six months after his ordination.

Moses has recommended parents prevent their children from accessing social media and has likened it to a "bad neighborhood". He notes his active presence on social media by explaining "there should be a priest in every bad neighborhood" and stating "I use it as a tool for evangelization. Otherwise, I’m not sure necessarily what the value is".
