= Taylor Lake (Texas) =

Lake in Texas

- Location within Texas Location within the United States
- Location: southeast of Houston adjacent to Clear Lake
- Coordinates: 29°46′7″N 94°40′45″W
- Basin countries: United States

Taylor Lake is a lake adjacent to Clear Lake, southeast of Houston, Texas, United States near Galveston Bay. The city of Taylor Lake Village lies on its shores within the Clear Lake Area of the Houston-Sugar Land-Baytown metropolitan area.
