= Kemah, Texas =

- City
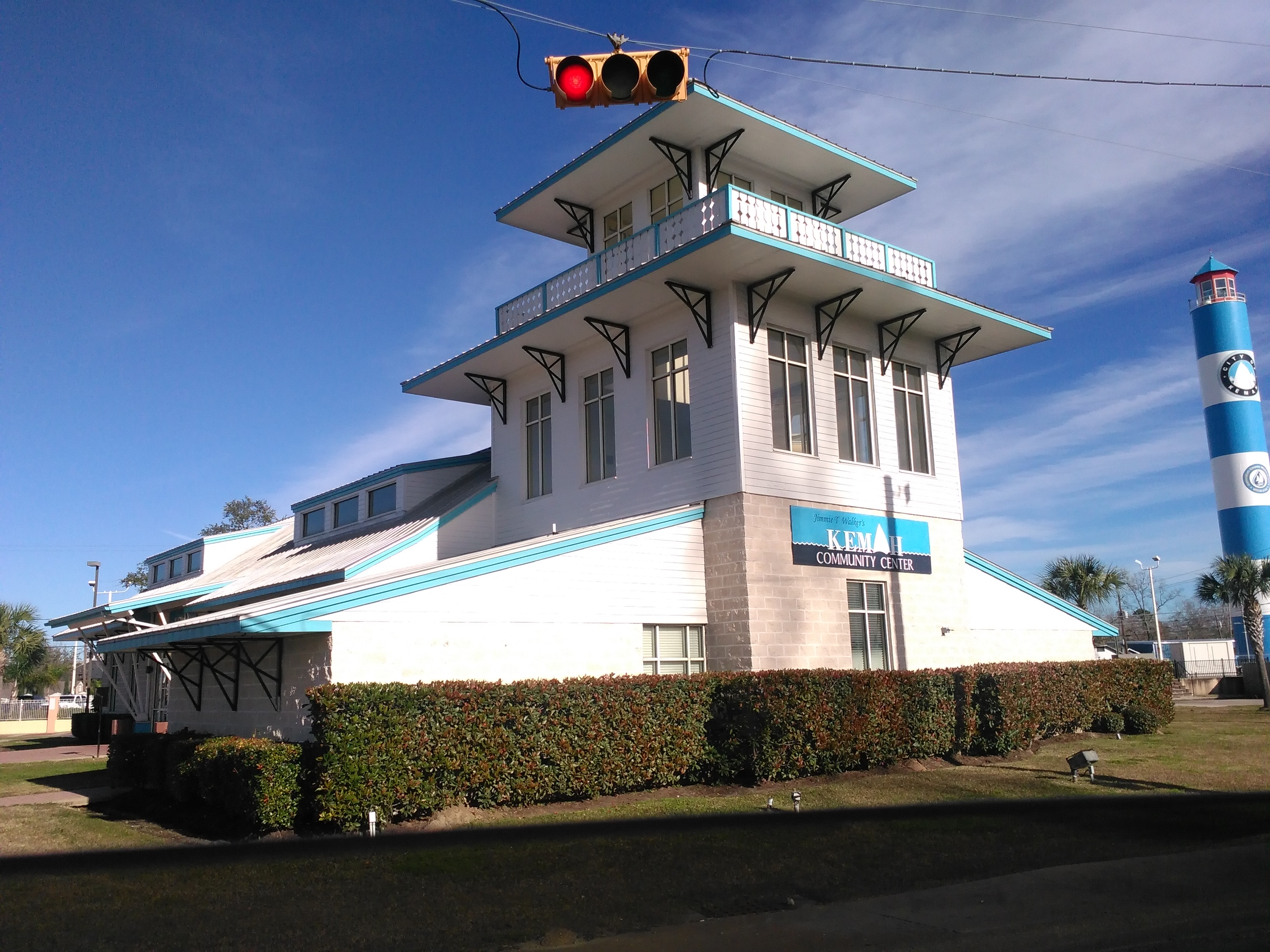
- Kemah Community Center
- Nickname: "Gateway to the Bay"
- Location of Kemah, Texas
- Coordinates: 29°32′33″N 95°1′13.08″W
- Country: United States
- State: Texas
- County: Galveston

Government
  - Mayor: Robin Collins

Area
  - Total: 1.92 sq mi (4.96 km^{2})
  - Land: 1.85 sq mi (4.78 km^{2})
  - Water: 0.066 sq mi (0.17 km^{2})
- Elevation: 6.6 ft (2 m)

Population (2020)
  - Total: 1,807
  - Density: 979/sq mi (378/km^{2})
- Time zone: UTC-6 (Central (CST))
  - Summer (DST): UTC-5 (CDT)
- ZIP code: 77565
- Area code: 281
- FIPS code: 48-38776
- GNIS feature ID: 1339021
- Website: www.kemah-tx.gov

Kemah (/ˈkiːmə/ KEE-mə) is a city in the U.S. state of Texas, southeast of Houston along west Galveston Bay. The city's population was 1,807 at the 2020 census, down from 2,330 at the 2000 census. Located in Galveston County, Kemah's main industry is shipping. Originally a small fishing town, the city has become a tourist destination for the area's restaurants and attractions, which are contained within the Kemah Entertainment District. In 2012 Kemah was ranked the top tourism spot in the Greater Houston area.

== Geography ==
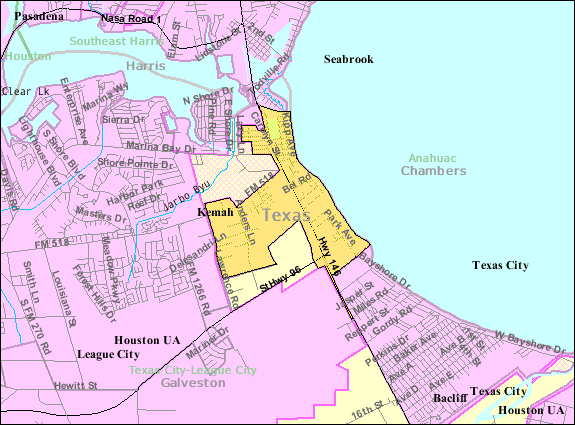
Map of Kemah

Kemah is located in the northeastern corner of Galveston County at 29°32′33″N 95°1′13.08″W (29.5425, –95.0203) and is part of the Clear Lake Area. It is bordered to the west and south by League City, to the northwest by Clear Lake Shores, to the southeast by unincorporated Bacliff, and at its northern end by Seabrook across the Clear Creek Channel in Harris County. Texas State Highway 146 leads through the center of Kemah, leading north 15 miles (24 km) to Baytown and south 12 miles (19 km) to Texas City. Galveston is 25 miles (40 km) to the south, and Houston is 30 miles (48 km) to the northwest.

According to the United States Census Bureau, Kemah has a total area of 1.91 square miles (4.94 km^{2}), of which 1.84 square miles (4.76 km^{2}) are land and 0.069 square miles (0.18 km^{2}), or 3.55%, are water.

== History ==
The land, measuring approximately 177 acres (72 ha), was the basis for a town that would be called Kemah. This land was granted to one of the first colonists who was a farmer and stockraiser, Michael Gouldrich, on August 24, 1824. Gouldrich's land was located near Clear Creek and Galveston Bay.

However, after Gouldrich disappeared, William Vince from Harris County acquired Gouldrich's Clear Creek land. Afterwards John Flanders, an Alamo fighter who was not supposed to have taken any land, bought the property from William Vince and it was renamed "Flanders Grove" or "Flanders Labor". When Flanders died at the age of 36, Allen Vince, of Vince's Bayou, was appointed executor of Flanders' estate in 1841. On May 28, 1844, there was a petition to sell the land to pay off debts. Soon after, the land was appraised for $2 an acre and sold to Jonathan D. Waters. He bought the Clear Creek land on July 2, 1844, for $354.

After October 1850, Waters sold 10 acres (4.0 ha) of the Clear Creek property to various people, but Henry Kipp eventually owned the land. During the 1890s, the Bradford and Kipp families moved to the area and portioned off the land into town lots in 1898, thus establishing the town known as "Evergreen". It was located along the Texas and New Orleans Railroad, and the area was also called "Shell Siding" for the oyster shell middens lining the bay, in some places 20 to 30 feet (6.1 to 9.1 m) deep.

After the 1900 Galveston hurricane, when the majority of the towns around Galveston Bay were destroyed, the Kipp and Bradford families were forced to evacuate, but later moved back to Evergreen in 1901. They rebuilt and restored the town, making two-story homes with porches for themselves on 10th street. In order for there to be a post office in the town, the name had to be changed because there was already a town called Evergreen. The name "Kemah" was chosen with the Karankawa Indian word meaning "wind in my face". In 1907, John H. Kipp Sr. established a post office in the newly named town of Kemah.

From the 1920s to the 1950s Kemah became a significant tourist destination resulting from investment by the Maceo crime family which ran Galveston during this time. The syndicate created a lavish casino district along the boardwalk featuring venues such as the Chili Bowl and the Kemah Den. During the 1950s the state Attorney General and the Texas Rangers finally shut down the Galveston vice empire. Kemah's casinos were closed and its tourism base declined drastically.

During the 1950s a major commercial shrimp fishing fleet was established in the town as the Clear Creek Channel was opened. Though Hurricane Carla severely damaged the city in 1961, the city rebuilt and the fishing business revived. During the 1970s, in part as a result of the establishment of the Johnson Space Center on Clear Lake, tourism began to re-emerge as pleasure boats began to fill the lake.

On October 22, 1966, the town of Kemah adopted Vernon's Texas Civil Statutes and became a General Law City. In 1992, the city expanded to 2 square miles (5.2 km^{2}), or 1,280 acres (520 ha), and the population increased to 1,300 residents.

In the late 1990s, Kemah continued to expand and began to be known as a tourist and recreational hot spot. This occurred when Landry's Restaurants opened the Kemah Boardwalk. The boardwalk now includes amusement rides for tourists and residents to enjoy.

House in Kemah that was struck by Hurricane Ike in 2008

On the morning of September 13, 2008, a Category 2 hurricane named Ike made landfall in Galveston County. Although the hurricane caused more damage to Galveston, Kemah still felt the effects of the storm. Hurricane Ike caused power outages in Kemah, destruction of homes and business, and streets to be piled with trees and debris. However, most importantly, the storm surge affected the Kemah Boardwalk the most. Although it did not take Landry's long to start to rebuild the tourist attraction, a waterline in the Landry's Restaurant is a reminder of the devastating hurricane.

== Demographics ==
Historical population
Census	Pop.	Note	%±
1970	1,144		—
1980	1,304		14.0%
1990	1,094		−16.1%
2000	2,330		113.0%
2010	1,773		−23.9%
2020	1,807		1.9%
U.S. Decennial Census

=== 2020 census ===
As of the 2020 census, Kemah had a population of 1,807. The median age was 40.9 years. 23.1% of residents were under the age of 18 and 14.9% of residents were 65 years of age or older. For every 100 females there were 101.7 males, and for every 100 females age 18 and over there were 101.3 males age 18 and over.

Racial composition as of the 2020 census
Race	Number	Percent
White	1,264	70.0%
Black or African American	68	3.8%
American Indian and Alaska Native	18	1.0%
Asian	88	4.9%
Native Hawaiian and Other Pacific Islander	1	0.1%
Some other race	97	5.4%
Two or more races	271	15.0%
Hispanic or Latino (of any race)	402	22.2%

100.0% of residents lived in urban areas, while 0.0% lived in rural areas.

There were 721 households in Kemah, of which 38.6% had children under the age of 18 living in them. Of all households, 48.0% were married-couple households, 22.1% were households with a male householder and no spouse or partner present, and 24.1% were households with a female householder and no spouse or partner present. About 24.2% of all households were made up of individuals and 10.9% had someone living alone who was 65 years of age or older.

There were 860 housing units, of which 16.2% were vacant. The homeowner vacancy rate was 2.2% and the rental vacancy rate was 12.7%.

=== 2000 census ===
As of the census of 2000, there were 2,330 people, 892 households, and 566 families residing in the city. The population density was 1,300.8 inhabitants per square mile (502.2/km^{2}). There were 1,075 housing units at an average density of 600.2 per square mile (231.7/km^{2}). The racial makeup of the city was 75.36% White, 3.82% African American, 0.86% Native American, 3.48% Asian, 15.79% from other races, and 0.69% from two or more races. Hispanic or Latino of any race were 24.76% of the population.

There were 892 households, out of which 35.0% had children under the age of 18 living with them, 49.7% were married couples living together, 9.4% had a female householder with no husband present, and 36.5% were non-families. 29.6% of all households were made up of individuals, and 3.6% had someone living alone who was 65 years of age or older. The average household size was 2.61 and the average family size was 3.25.

In the city, the population was spread out, with 27.4% under the age of 18, 11.6% from 18 to 24, 36.9% from 25 to 44, 18.0% from 45 to 64, and 6.1% who were 65 years of age or older. The median age was 31 years. For every 100 females, there were 115.1 males. For every 100 females age 18 and over, there were 114.2 males.

The median income for a household in the city was $51,620, and the median income for a family was $64,063. Males had a median income of $50,061 versus $31,953 for females. The per capita income for the city was $23,373. About 7.8% of families and 8.2% of the population were below the poverty line, including 5.7% of those under age 18 and 10.0% of those age 65 or over.

== Government and infrastructure ==
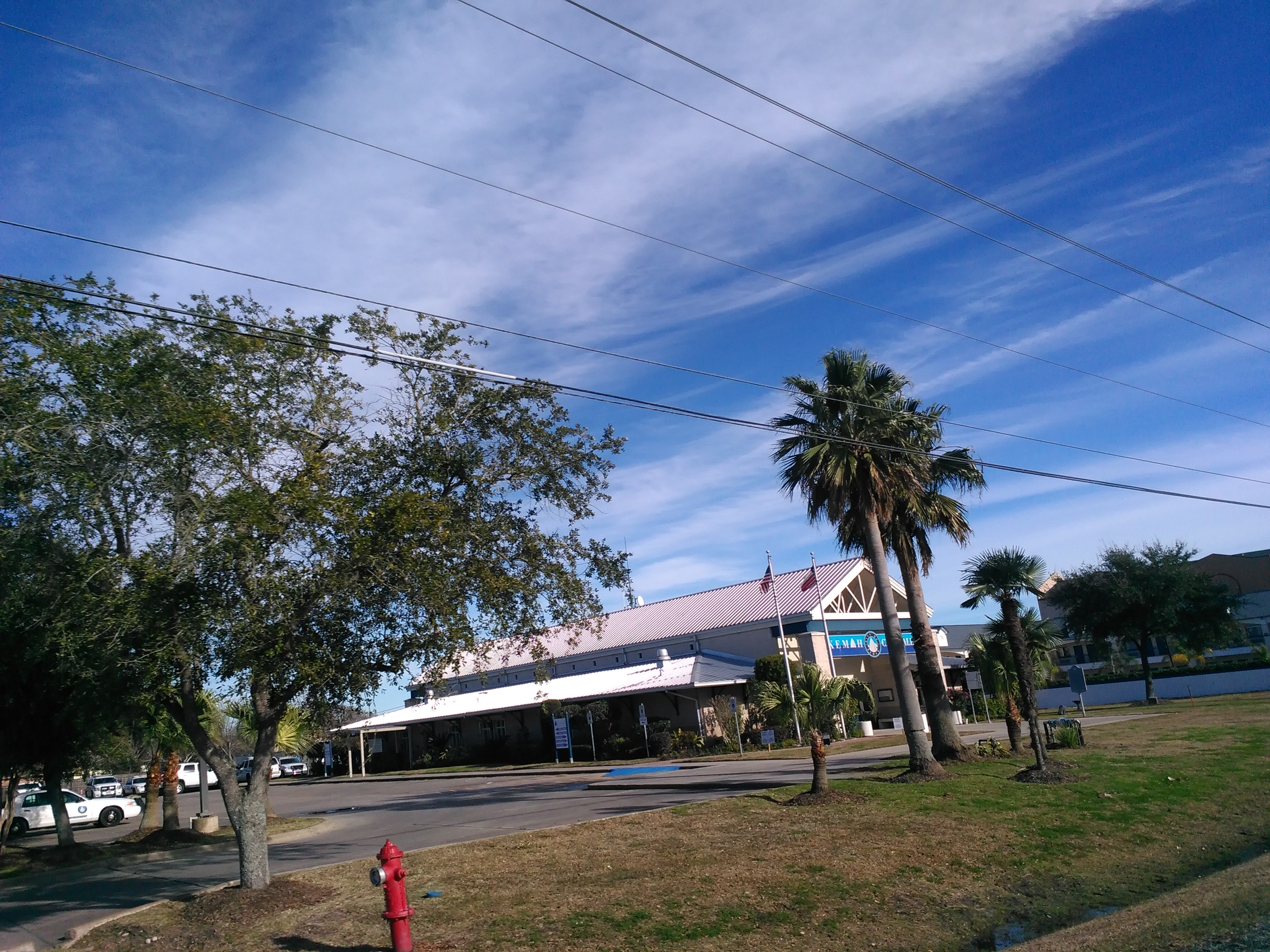
Kemah city hall

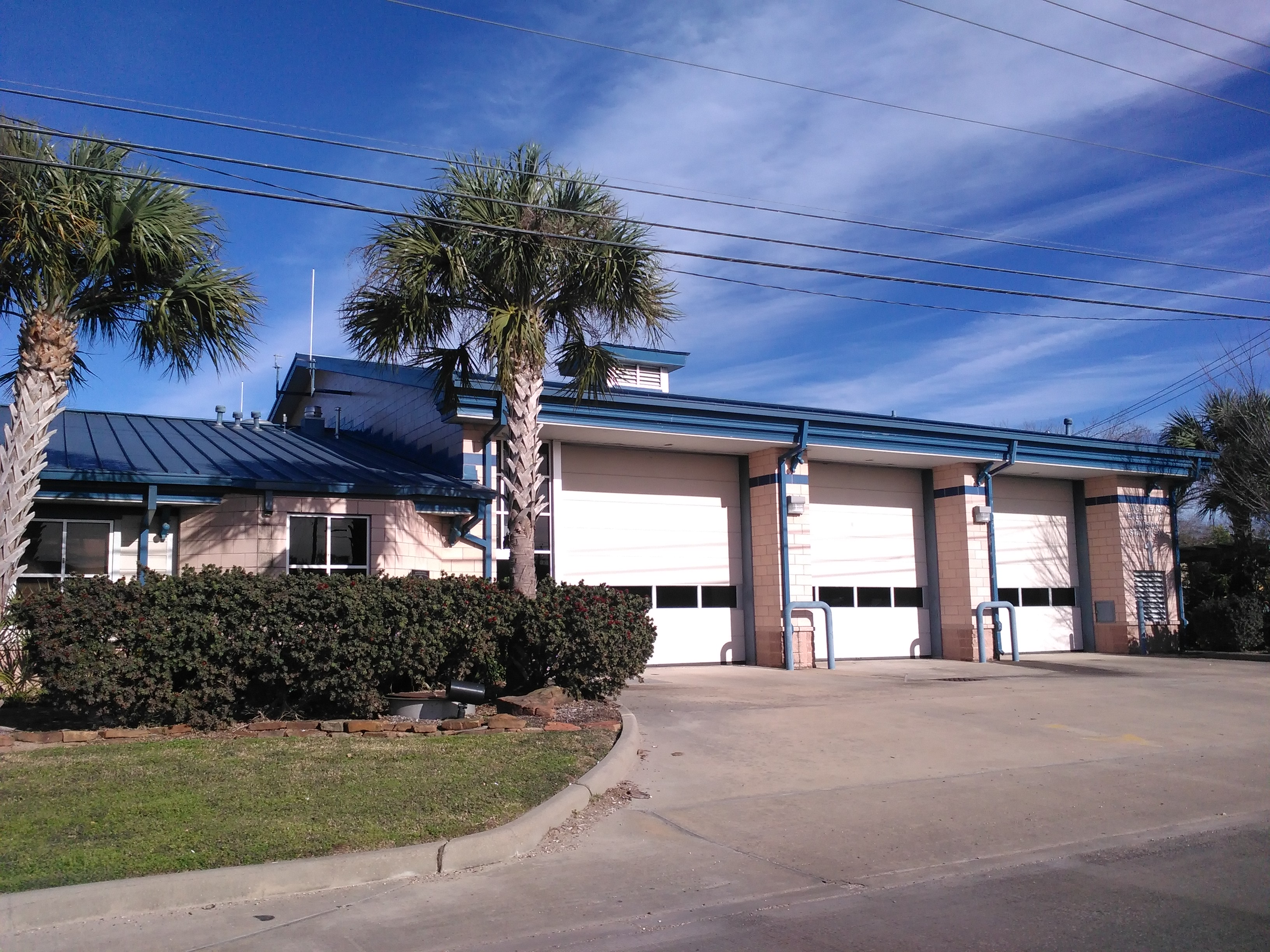
Kemah Fire Station

The Kemah Fire Department and the Kemah Police Department serve Kemah.

As per a governmental agreement, Kemah receives animal services from the Galveston County Animal Resource Center, an animal shelter operated by the Galveston County Health District in Texas City.

Galveston Area Ambulance Authority (GAAA), also operated by the health district, provides EMS services to this municipality.

== Crime ==
In a 2008 Houston Press article, "Gator" Miller, publisher of small newspapers such as the monthly magazine Seabreeze and the entertainment magazine Night Moves, said that a White American gang from Bacliff committed crimes in Kemah.

== Education ==
Pupils in Kemah attend schools in Clear Creek Independent School District. The community is within the Board of Trustees District 1, represented by Robert Allan Davee as of 2008. CCISD was established in 1948, partly from the former Kemah school district. The former Kemah district served up to junior high school with high schoolers going to Webster.

Pupils are zoned to Stewart Elementary School (formerly Kemah Elementary School) in unincorporated Galveston County, Bayside Intermediate School in League City, and Clear Falls High School in League City.

Previously residents were zoned to League City Intermediate School, and Clear Creek High School in League City.

Residents of Clear Creek ISD (and therefore Kemah) are zoned to the College of the Mainland, a community college in Texas City.

== See also ==
- Galveston Bay Area
- Clear Lake (region)
