= Clear Lake (region) =

Clear Lake Area
- region
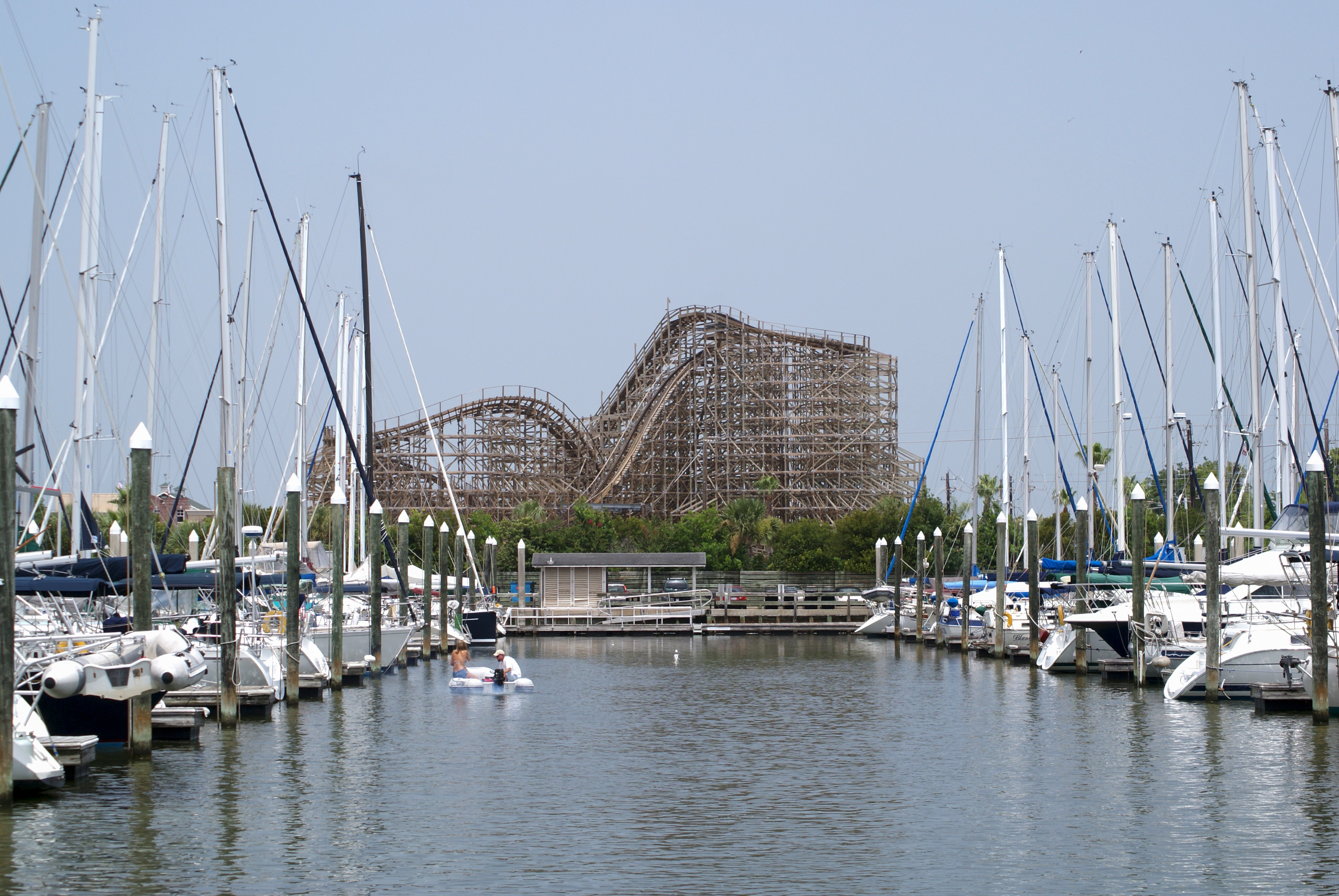
- Kemah boardwalk and marina

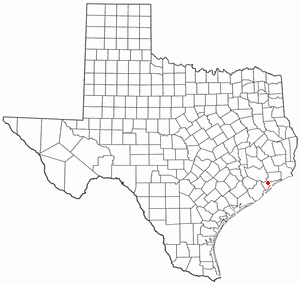
- Location of the Clear Lake area
- Country: United States
- State: Texas
- Metro Area: Houston–Pasadena–The Woodlands
- Established: 1962
- Named for: Clear Lake (Galveston Bay)

Population
  - Estimate (2000): 141,980
- Time zone: UTC-6 (CST)
  - Summer (DST): UTC-5 (CDT)
- ZIP code: 77058, 77059, 77062, 77258, 77505, 77507, 77565, 77573, 77586, 77598
- Area code: 281
- Website: clearlakearea.com

Clear Lake, or the Clear Lake Area, is a region in parts of Harris and Galveston County in Texas, United States. It is part of the Galveston Bay Area, which itself is a section of the Houston–Pasadena–The Woodlands metropolitan area. The area is geographically characterized by the bodies of water in it and around it, including Clear Lake, Taylor Lake, Clear Creek, and Galveston Bay.

Clear Lake is relatively affluent with a thriving business community. The area's most important business sectors are aerospace and tourism. It is home to the Johnson Space Center and numerous aerospace contracting firms. The lake itself is home to one of the largest concentrations of recreational boats and marinas in the nation.

== Name ==
The Clear Lake region is named after Clear Lake, a brackish lake fed by Clear Creek that empties into Galveston Bay.

The name "Clear Lake" is used in several ways depending on context. It may refer specifically to the lake itself or to the surrounding region commonly associated with it. In local usage, the term may also refer to the Clear Lake City residential development, the Clear Lake area of Houston (a Houston "superneighborhood" that includes Clear Lake City, the Lyndon B. Johnson Space Center, and nearby communities), and the Clear Lake area of Pasadena.

Because of these overlapping uses, the term "Clear Lake" can describe either the physical geographic feature or the broader suburban region surrounding it in the Greater Houston area.

== Boundaries ==
As of 2010 the Clear Lake Area Chamber of Commerce, established in 1962, provides the following definition for the area.

The Clear Lake Area Chamber of Commerce recognizes the defined "Clear Lake Area" as its service territory. This composite community includes Clear Lake City, Clear Lake Shores, El Lago, Kemah, League City, Nassau Bay, Seabrook, Taylor Lake Village, Webster, and parts of Houston.

— Clear Lake Area Chamber of Commerce

These communities lie on or near the lake. They occupy a compact area lying between Houston and the bay. Clear Lake City is itself a composite community within the Clear Lake Area that spans parts of Houston, Webster, and Seabrook.

== History ==
At the time Europeans arrived the area around Galveston Bay was largely inhabited by Akokisa and Karankawa tribes. The first substantial European presence in the area came as a result of the pirate kingdom established by Jean Lafitte in the early 19th century from his base on Galveston Island. One of the earliest settlers in the region was Anson Taylor, namesake of Taylor Lake, who supplied Lafitte's Galveston colony with produce and game from around Armand Bayou (though his homestead was actually near the Trinity River).

During most of the 19th century the Clear Lake Area remained largely undeveloped. Ranches such as the famed Allen Ranch used much of the area as a cattle range. Toward the end of the century small farming and fishing communities developed. Railroads grew up near the area as well connecting the nearby commercial centers of Galveston, Harrisburg, and Houston spawning new communities such as Clear Creek (League City) and Webster.

In 1901 the oil gusher at Spindletop launched the Texas Oil Boom. Soon oil wells and refineries were built in nearby Goose Creek (modern Baytown) and Texas City. Houston rapidly became established as the main commercial center in the area for the oil industry. The Clear Lake Area became an attractive recreational destination for the new class of wealthy oil businessmen. Much of the area was developed as retreats for the wealthy including a large ranch estate owned by Houston businessman James West. The population increased rapidly including significant immigration from overseas. The Maceo crime syndicate, which ran Galveston at that time, created casino districts in Kemah and other areas of Galveston County (though they were shut down in the mid-20th century).

In 1963 NASA's Johnson Space Center (JSC) was established in the area. That and the explosive growth of neighboring Houston in the mid-20th century, especially the 1970s and 80s, caused significant urbanization. The Clear Lake City community was created by the Friendswood Development Company, a venture of Humble Oil and Dell E. Webb Corporation, to support residential growth near the new NASA facility. Some of the communities around Clear Lake reoriented toward aerospace-related industries. Still tourism and recreation remain core industries of the area today.

== Economy ==
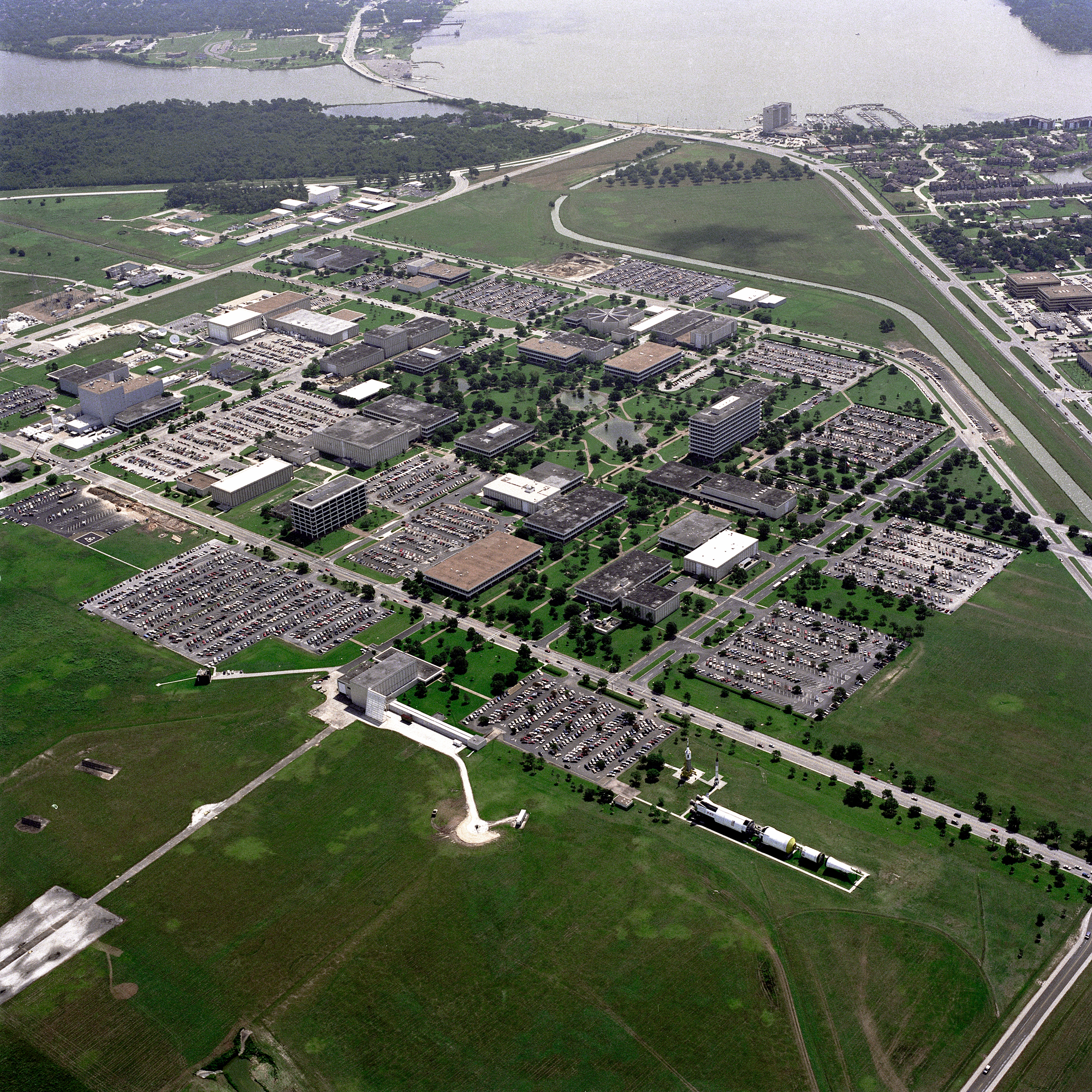
Johnson Space Center

The area's most important employment sectors are aerospace, high-tech (software, biotechnology, electronics, etc.), and tourism. Most other employment in the region is supported by these industries. Also, a significant number of petrochemical and refining industry employees who work at near-by facilities live in the area.

NASA's Johnson Space Center (JSC) is an important pillar of the area economy. As of 2010 the center itself employs 3,000 civil servants and 12,000 engineering contractors. Businesses around this core include a broad range of high-tech development enterprises. JSC manages more than $4 billion annually in aerospace contracts, and together with numerous private companies involved in space programs and related ventures gives the area one of the highest concentrations of aerospace businesses and expertise in the nation.

The tourism industry attracts millions of visitors each year with attractions ranging from Space Center Houston to the bay itself. Ecotourism, in particular, is a growing sector with destinations such as the Armand Bayou Nature Center, one of the largest urban wilderness preserves in the nation, and the Seabrook Trail System (part of the Great Texas Coastal Birding Trail). Biotechnology, which already employs nearly 3000 workers in the area, is a smaller but growing industry in the area enabled in large part by JSC and the Texas Medical Center in Houston. Commercial fishing is one of the older industries in the region and is still a significant economic sector.

== Demographics ==
Community	Total population	Median household income	% White	% African American	% Asian
Clear Lake-Houston	43,141	$68,815	77.8%	4.7%	11.4%
Clear Lake Shores	1205	$67,500	94.9%	3.3%	7.5%
El Lago	3075	$66,223	94.5%	7.8%	1.4%
Kemah	2330	$51,620	75.4%	3.8%	3.5%
League City	106,244	$67,838	84.0%	5.1%	3.2%
Nassau Bay	4170	$57,353	89.6%	1.9%	3.9%
Seabrook	9443	$54,175	88.9%	2.1%	3.3%
Taylor Lake Village	3694	$99,535	92.4%	2.7%	2.1%
Webster	9083	$42,385	64.9%	9.0%	5.7%
Total	141,980	$64,742	81.6%	4.4%	6.1%

The Clear Lake Area contains diverse communities. Based on data from the U.S. Census Bureau and the City of Houston the area had following demographic statistics in 2000. The total population of the area was approximately 141,980. The median household income was approximately $64,742 (US). The population was 81.6% white, 4.4% African-American, and 6.1% Asian. The comparable statistics for nearby Houston were a median household income of $36,616, 49.3% white, 25.3% African American, and 5.3% Asian. The comparable U.S. statistics were a median household income of $41,994, 75.1% white, 12.3% African American, and 3.6% Asian.

Apart from Houston, which is only partially within the Clear Lake area, League City is the area's largest community. As of 2000 Taylor Lake Village has the highest median household income in the area and Webster has the lowest.

== Education ==
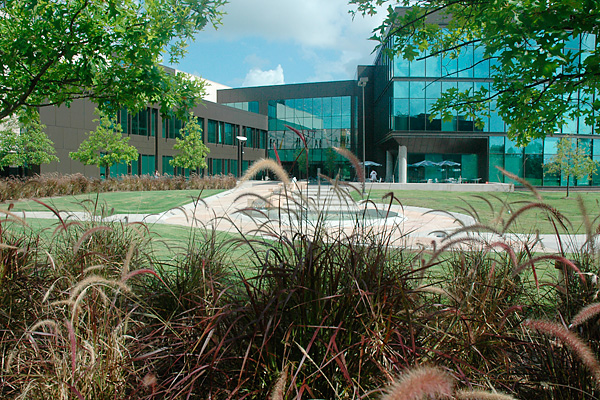
University of Houston–Clear Lake

The primary institution of higher learning in the area is the University of Houston–Clear Lake (UHCL). UHCL is separate and distinct from the University of Houston (UH), but it is part of the larger University of Houston System. The university offers a wide spectrum of programs including what it touts as the most complete biotechnology graduate programs in the state. Additionally San Jacinto College has extension centers in the area.

Primary and secondary education are provided by Clear Creek Independent School District, which serves most of the area's communities with the exception of outlying parts of League City. As of 2009 Clear Creek ISD was ranked as a "recognized" district (the second-highest ranking) by the Texas Education Agency. 25 (65%) of the district's schools were ranked as "exemplary" (the highest ranking) and the rest were ranked as "recognized". For comparison, 29% of all schools in Texas rated by the TEA were ranked as "exemplary".

== Culture and recreation ==
In terms of the restaurants in the region, Katharine Shilcutt of the Houston Press said in 2010 "there's also more to the area than overly-fancy eateries like Cullen's or old mainstays like Villa Capri and the Seabrook Classic Cafe. (Not that we don't cling to nostalgic memories of those last two places, but there's better food to be found in Clear Lake now.)"

=== Festivals and events ===
Many annual events take place in the Clear Lake Area. The Blessing of the Fleet boat parade in Kemah is an annual event that celebrates Kemah's history as a shrimp fishing town. The Gulf Coast Film Festival annually showcases independent films from local, regional and international artists in various categories ranging from short films to documentaries. Other annual events include the Wings over Houston Air Fest (Ellington Field), the Ballunar Liftoff Festival, the Oak Tree Festival (League City), and the South Shore Dockside Food & Wine Festival (League City). The Galveston Bay Cruising Association holds regular regatta events on the bay such as the Bay Cup (Lakewood Yacht Club, Seabrook) and the Performance Cup.

=== Artistic programs ===
The region offers various artistic programs. The Bay Area Houston Ballet and Theatre group and the League City Ballet offer performances in genres ranging from ballet to American musicals. The Clear Lake Symphony offers multiple performances each year ranging from classical to "pops" performances. The Arts Alliance at Clear Lake, a group of 50 area arts organizations, regularly schedules arts exhibits, musical performances, and other arts programs. The Clear Creek Country Theatre (Nassau Bay) offers regular community theater performances. Additionally various free concerts and other cultural events take place in venues such as League Park Plaza (League City).

=== Parks and attractions ===
The Armand Bayou Nature Center is one of the largest urban wilderness preserve in the nation. It features a boardwalk through the marshes, numerous nature trails, and boat tours offering views of natural habitats for animals ranging from bison to seagulls to butterflies. The Texas Armand Bayou Coastal Preserve features one of region's most popular paddling trails. The Seabrook Trail System, which includes Robinson and Pine Gully Parks, offers primitive access to natural habitats for numerous species. These sites are all part of the larger Great Texas Coastal Birding Trail. Other major area parks include Harris County Clear Lake and Bay Area parks, Clear Creek Nature Park (League City) and Challenger 7 Memorial Park (Webster).

Space Center Houston is the tourist arm of the Johnson Space Center and one of the most visited tourist attractions in Texas. Visitors can tour the Space Center grounds, view space capsules and artifacts, and find numerous educational activities including an IMAX theater. The Kemah Boardwalk is a waterfront attraction featuring a variety of rides, restaurants, shops, and other entertainment venues. It is next to the Kemah Marina and hosts annual events such as the Boardwalk Wine Festival. Museums in the area include the Bay Area Museum (Seabrook) and the Butler Longhorn Museum (League City).

Farmers markets in the area, including the Nassau Bay Farmers Market and the Farmers Market at Clear Lake Shores, provide opportunities for area residents to connect with local growers, producers, and other businesses. The League City Historic District provides views of early area architecture in addition to unique shopping venues.

The area contains many marinas for boating and fishing enthusiasts such as the Watergate Yachting Center (Clear Lake Shores) and Marina Bay Harbor Marina. The shoreline of Clear Lake itself has the greatest concentration of recreational boats in Texas and ranks third nationwide (Watergate even claims to be the nation's largest).

=== Religion ===
There is one Coptic Orthodox church in the area, Archangel Raphael Coptic Orthodox Church in Clear Lake City.

The Clear Lake Islamic Center Inc. (CLIC) is the largest mosque in the Clear Lake area. It was established in 1996. In addition, the Al-Noor Society of Greater Houston operates the Clear Lake Jama Masjid.

== See also ==
- Greater Houston
