= Clear Creek High School (League City, Texas) =

Public school in Texas, United States

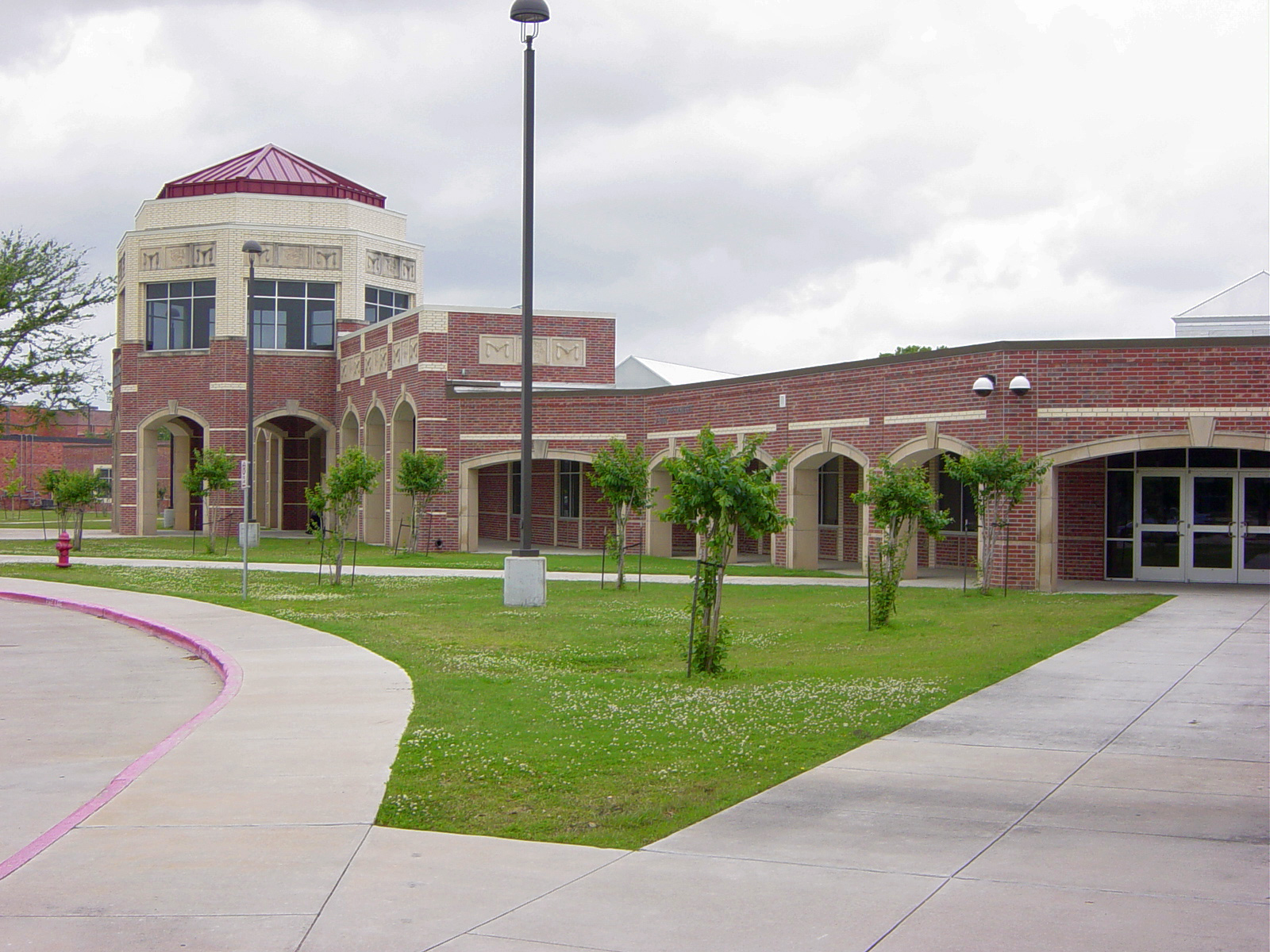
- Front entrance view of CCHS

Location
- 2305 East Main Street; League City, Texas 77573; United States; 29°31′30″N 95°04′16″W

Information
- Type: Public High School
- Motto: "Once a Wildcat, always a Wildcat."
- Established: 1956
- School district: Clear Creek Independent School District
- NCES District ID: 4814280
- Superintendent: Karen Engle
- NCES School ID: 481428000903
- Principal: Ashley Orr
- Teaching staff: 143.42 (on an FTE basis)
- Grades: 9–12
- Enrollment: 2,469 (2024–2025)
- Student to teacher ratio: 17.22
- Campus type: Suburb
- Colours: Maroon, White
- Slogan: Be the difference
- Athletics: UIL 6A
- Athletics conference: UIL Region III District 24-6A
- Mascot: Willie the Wildcat
- Nickname: Wildcats
- Rival: Clear Lake High School Clear Springs High School
- Communities served: League City
- Website: School website

Clear Creek High School is located in League City, Texas, in the Clear Creek Independent School District. The school serves most of League City and the cities of Kemah, Clear Lake Shores, Nassau Bay, and Webster.

The school colors are maroon and white. The school's mascot is Willie the Wildcat.

== History ==
Clear Creek High School was established in 1956 as the first high school in the Clear Creek Independent School District. By 1972, Clear Creek High School was overpopulated and a second district high school, Clear Lake High School was opened.

== Feeder patterns ==
The following elementary schools feed into Clear Creek High School: Falcon Pass, Ferguson, Goforth, Hyde, League City, McWhirter, Robinson, and Stewart and Parr.

The following intermediate schools feed into Clear Creek High School: League City, Space Center, Victory Lakes, and the newest intermediate school Clear Creek ISD. Clear Brook High school took portions of the Clear Creek High School attendance zone when it opened in 1988.

Clear Springs High School took portions of the Clear Creek High School attendance zone when it opened in 2007. Bauerschlag, Gilmore, Hall, Ross, Creekside, and some of Victory Lakes will no longer feed into Clear Creek.

Clear Falls High School took portions of the Clear Creek High School attendance zone when it opened in 2010.

== Notable alumni ==
- Christopher Sabat, voice actor and producer
- Shelly Berg, dean, Frost School of Music at the University of Miami
- Jay Buhner, former Major League Baseball player for the Seattle Mariners
- Jarred Cosart, Major League Baseball player for the San Diego Padres
- Matthew Etzel, baseball outfielder in the Miami Marlins organization
- Richard Garriott, video game designer
- Scott Mitchell, former wide receiver in the Arena Football League and Canadian Football League
- Cliff Olander, American player of gridiron football
- Chase Ortiz, former football player for the Winnipeg Blue Bombers of the Canadian Football League
- James Patton, former football player for the Buffalo Bills of the National Football League
- Riley Salmon, 2008 Olympic indoor volleyball gold medalist (also competed in the 2004 Summer Olympics)
- Susan Swift, child actress
