= James Patton (defensive lineman) =

American football player (born 1970)

No. 99
- Positions: Nose tackle, defensive end

Personal information
- Born: January 5, 1970 (age 56); Brazoria County, Texas, U.S.
- Listed height: 6 ft 3 in (1.91 m)
- Listed weight: 287 lb (130 kg)

Career information
- High school: Clear Creek (League City, Texas)
- College: Texas
- NFL draft: 1992: 2nd round, 55th overall pick

Career history
- Buffalo Bills (1992–1995)

Awards and highlights
- Second-team All-American (1991); 2× First-team All-SWC (1990, 1991)

Career NFL statistics
- Tackles: 3
- Stats at Pro Football Reference

James Gregory Patton (born January 5, 1970) is an American former professional football player who was a defensive lineman for the Buffalo Bills of the National Football League (NFL). He was on their roster for two seasons, when they went to Super Bowl XXVIII. Before that, he played college football for the Texas Longhorns twice earning first-team all-conference honors.

== Early life ==
Patton was born on January 5, 1970, in Brazoria County, Texas. He played high school football at Clear Creek High School in League City, Texas.

== College career ==
Patton played at the University of Texas at Austin, earning first-team All-Southwest Conference honors in 1990 and 1991 and 2nd team All-American honors in 1991. He helped the team win the 1990 Southwest Conference Championship and played in the 1991 Cotton Bowl. He finished his career with 22 sacks, 8th most in school history at the time, and 6 fumble recoveries, 5th best at the time. He was MVP of the Longhorns' 1991 team. He received a Bachelor and Master of Business Administration from Texas.

== Professional career ==
Patton was selected by the Buffalo Bills with the 55th pick in the 2nd round of the 1992 NFL Draft. He missed the 1992 season due to a hip injury. Prior to the 1993 he was waived by the Bills and then recalled the next day. He spent all but 2 games in 1993 on the inactive list, including the Bills playoff run and Super Bowl game. 1994 was his most productive season. He played in 11 games, sitting out or being inactive for the other five, during which he recorded a single kick-off return for 1 yard. In 1995, he became a free agent, was signed by the Bills, but missed the whole season due to his hip. He was released by the Bills at the end of the season on December 12, 1995.

== Personal life ==
Patton later became CEO of The Boon Group in Austin, Texas and CEO of FairPrice Healthcare, LLC.
