= Bay Area Houston Ballet and Theatre =

American non-profit theater group

Bay Area Houston Ballet and Theatre is a non-profit performance theater group located in the Bay Area of Greater Houston in the United States. The group offers performances in genres ranging from ballet to American musicals.

The group's home is the Feijoo Ballet School in Dickinson (in the Clear Lake Area near Houston), whose faculty résumés include the Houston Ballet, the Joffrey Ballet, and American Ballet Theatre, and Broadway. Performances are held at Bayou Theater on the campus of the University of Houston–Clear Lake.

The company was created to support the "pre-professional and aspiring professional dancer." It is not affiliated with the Houston Ballet.
