= Gulf Coast Film Festival =

Gulf Coast Film and Video Festival
- Festival logo
- Location: Clear Lake Area, Texas, United States
- Founded: 1999
- Language: English
- Website: http://www.gulfcoastfilmfest.com

The Gulf Coast Film and Video Festival (GCFVF), commonly known as the Gulf Coast Film Festival, is a film festival in the United States held in the Clear Lake Area of Greater Houston, Texas (United States). In 2008, 127 independently made films were submitted to the festival of which 26 were selected and shown in the festival.

Established in 1999 the Gulf Coast Film Festival features independent films from local, regional and international artists in various categories ranging from short films to documentaries.

Each year the festival grants a lifetime achievement award to an artist or film maker in recognition of their contribution. Previous winners of this award include Walter Coblenz (producer/director), Loretta Swit (actress) and Melissa Gilbert (actress), and Erin Gray (actress).

One of the festival's aims is to promote the Galveston Bay Area as a location for filming. The festival also works with local businesses to promote tourism in the area.
