= Nassau Bay, Texas =

- City
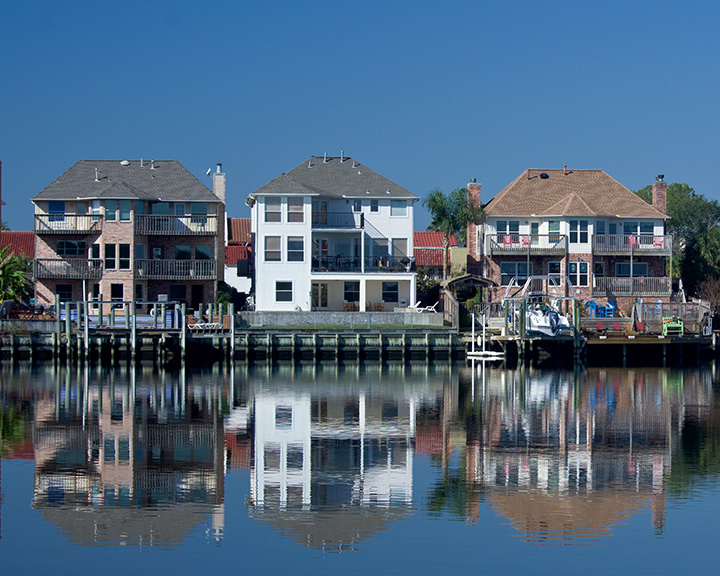
- Lakeside houses in Nassau Bay, Texas

- Location in Harris County and the state of Texas
- Coordinates: 29°32′40″N 95°5′22″W
- Country: United States
- State: Texas
- County: Harris

Area
  - Total: 1.75 sq mi (4.52 km^{2})
  - Land: 1.22 sq mi (3.16 km^{2})
  - Water: 0.53 sq mi (1.36 km^{2})
- Elevation: 13 ft (4.0 m)

Population (2020)
  - Total: 5,347
  - Density: 3,256/sq mi (1,257.1/km^{2})
- Time zone: UTC–6 (CST)
  - Summer (DST): UTC–5 (CDT)
- ZIP codes: 77058 & 77258
- Area code: 281
- FIPS code: 48-50376
- GNIS feature ID: 1388574
- Website: www.nassaubay.com

Nassau Bay is a city in Harris County, Texas, United States, bordering the outermost southeastern edge of the city of Houston. It is located in the Clear Lake Area near Galveston Bay, directly adjacent to the Lyndon B. Johnson Space Center. The population was 5,347 at the 2020 census.

== History ==
Colonel Raymond Pearson established the Spirit of 1776 Ranch on what would become Nassau Bay. In 1962, a community was planned which would be an exclusive residential and commercial area emphasizing its pioneers and at a then-staggering cost of $49 million. In 1962 construction of Nassau Bay began and the first residents moved to Nassau Bay in 1964; its initial population was 400. It was developed by Ernest W. Roe Company, with Thompson McCleary of Caudill, Rowlett, and Scott providing architectural services and Nassau Bay Development Associates establishing the development. The name was chosen by the developers because of the tropical feeling it generated. At the time, NASA was moving personnel from several areas in the United States with a high quality of life, including California and, notably, Florida.

In 1968 the community had 2,979 residents. The city incorporated in 1970. The population was 6,702 in 1980, 4,526 in 1982, 4,506 in 1991, and 4,170 in 2000.

== Geography ==
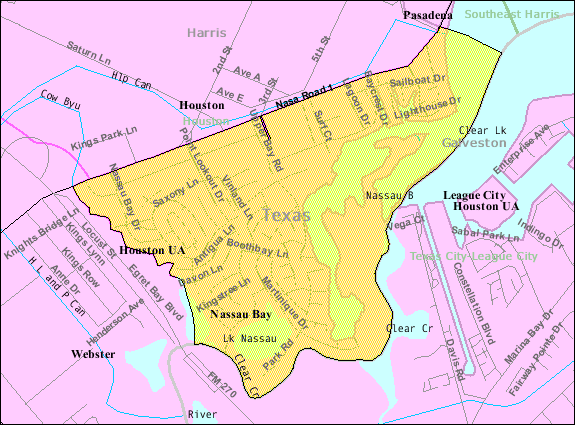
Map of Nassau Bay

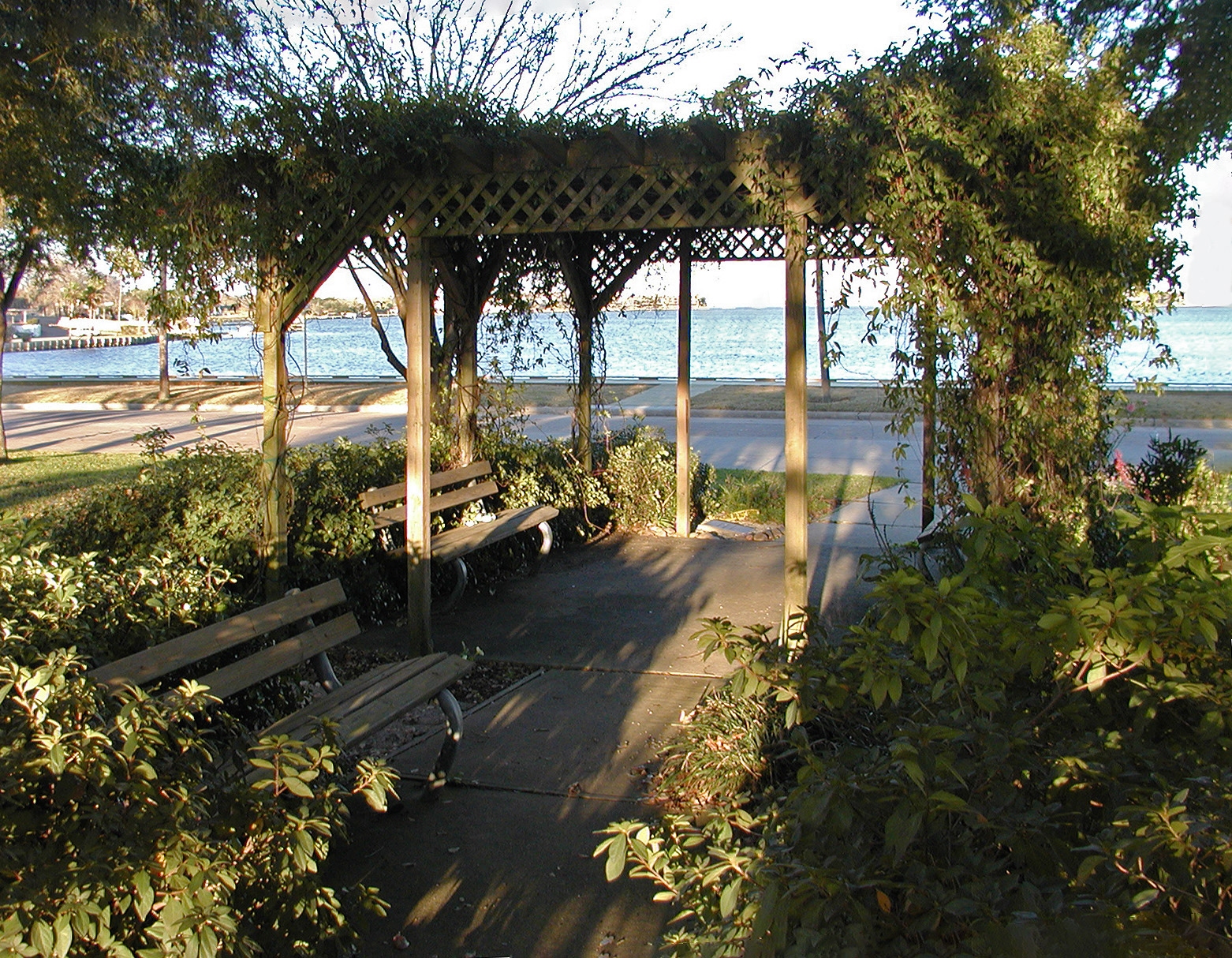
Howard Ward Park

Nassau Bay is located in southeastern Harris County at 29°32′40″N 95°5′22″W (29.544463, –95.089558). It is bordered to the west by the city of Webster, and to the north by the city of Houston. It is bordered to the south by Clear Creek and to the southeast by the head of Clear Lake, an arm of Galveston Bay. Across the creek and lake, Nassau Bay is bordered by League City in Galveston County.

According to the United States Census Bureau, the city of Nassau Bay has a total area of 1.7 square miles (4.5 km^{2}), of which 1.2 square miles (3.2 km^{2}) land and 0.54 square miles (1.4 km^{2}), or 30.12%, are water.

It is adjacent to the Johnson Space Center (JSC), which lies on the other side of Texas State Highway NASA Road 1 within the Houston city limits. Carlton Bayou, Clear Lake, and Swan Lagoon serve as boundaries of the community.

== Demographics ==
Historical population
Census	Pop.	Note	%±
1980	4,526		—
1990	4,320		−4.6%
2000	4,170		−3.5%
2010	4,002		−4.0%
2020	5,347		33.6%
U.S. Decennial Census

=== Racial and ethnic composition ===
Nassau Bay city, Texas – Racial and ethnic composition Note: the US Census treats Hispanic/Latino as an ethnic category. This table excludes Latinos from the racial categories and assigns them to a separate category. Hispanics/Latinos may be of any race.
Race / Ethnicity (NH = Non-Hispanic)	Pop 2000	Pop 2010	Pop 2020	% 2000	% 2010	% 2020
White alone (NH)	3,554	3,044	3,413	85.23%	76.06%	63.83%
Black or African American alone (NH)	78	135	340	1.87%	3.37%	6.36%
Native American or Alaska Native alone (NH)	20	25	18	0.48%	0.62%	0.34%
Asian alone (NH)	163	138	229	3.91%	3.45%	4.28%
Native Hawaiian or Pacific Islander alone (NH)	6	6	2	0.14%	0.15%	0.04%
Other race alone (NH)	3	5	16	0.07%	0.12%	0.30%
Mixed race or Multiracial (NH)	84	77	222	2.01%	1.92%	4.15%
Hispanic or Latino (any race)	262	572	1,107	6.28%	14.29%	20.70%
Total	4,170	4,002	5,347	100.00%	100.00%	100.00%

=== 2020 census ===
As of the 2020 census, Nassau Bay had a population of 5,347 and a median age of 40.2 years. 18.5% of residents were under the age of 18 and 20.3% of residents were 65 years of age or older. For every 100 females there were 101.8 males, and for every 100 females age 18 and over there were 100.3 males age 18 and over.

100.0% of residents lived in urban areas, while 0.0% lived in rural areas.

There were 2,501 households in Nassau Bay, of which 24.9% had children under the age of 18 living in them. Of all households, 40.3% were married-couple households, 25.0% were households with a male householder and no spouse or partner present, and 27.5% were households with a female householder and no spouse or partner present. About 36.0% of all households were made up of individuals and 11.4% had someone living alone who was 65 years of age or older.

There were 2,791 housing units, of which 10.4% were vacant. The homeowner vacancy rate was 1.4% and the rental vacancy rate was 12.9%.

According to the 2020 American Community Survey, the median household income was $62,273 with a mean income of $91,293.

Racial composition as of the 2020 census
Race	Number	Percent
White	3,694	69.1%
Black or African American	361	6.8%
American Indian and Alaska Native	40	0.7%
Asian	229	4.3%
Native Hawaiian and Other Pacific Islander	5	0.1%
Some other race	306	5.7%
Two or more races	712	13.3%
Hispanic or Latino (of any race)	1,107	20.7%

=== 2000 census ===
As of the census of 2000, there were 4,170 people, 2,049 households, and 1,213 families residing in the city. The population density was 3,146.0 inhabitants per square mile (1,214.7/km^{2}). There were 2,243 housing units at an average density of 1,692.2 per square mile (653.4/km^{2}).

According to the 2000 U.S. census, the racial makeup of the city was 89.64% White, 3.91% Asian, 2.23% of multi-racial background, 1.87% African American, 1.68% from other races, 0.50% Native American, and 0.17% Pacific Islander. Hispanic or Latino of any race accounted for 6.28% of the population.

In 2000, the median income for a household in the city was $57,353, and the median income for a family was $77,252. Males had a median income of $52,295 versus $38,819 for females. The per capita income for the city was $39,113. About 3.0% of families and 4.5% of the population were below the poverty line, including 6.3% of those under age 18 and 4.8% of those age 65 or over.

== Education ==
=== Primary and secondary schools ===
==== Public schools ====
Pupils in Nassau Bay attend schools in Clear Creek Independent School District. The community is within the Board of Trustees District 2, represented by Win Weber as of 2008.

Pupils are zoned to Robinson Elementary School in Pasadena, Space Center Intermediate School (Houston), and Clear Creek High School (League City).

Prior to the 2006–2007 school year, Nassau Bay was zoned to Falcon Pass Elementary School (Houston).

==== Private schools ====
St. Thomas the Apostle Episcopal School, a private school, is located in Nassau Bay.

==== Colleges and universities ====
The portion of Clear Creek ISD in Harris County (and therefore Nassau Bay) is assigned to San Jacinto College.

== Government and infrastructure ==
The United States Postal Service operates the Nassau Bay Post Office at 18214 Upper Bay Road. Nassau Bay postal addresses are designated as "Houston, Texas".

Harris Health System (formerly Harris County Hospital District) designated Strawberry Health Center in Pasadena for ZIP code 77058. The nearest public hospital is Ben Taub General Hospital in the Texas Medical Center.

== Sister city ==
Nassau Bay is the sister city of Star City, Russia, the home of the Russian equivalent of the Johnson Space Center.

== Notable people ==
- Richard Garriott (b. 1961) – video game developer and businessman
- Tramon Mark (b. 2001) – college basketball player
- Bob J. Perry (1932–2013) – homebuilder and major political donor
