= Lakewood Yacht Club =

Yacht club in Seabrook, Texas

- Burgee
- Short name: LYC
- Founded: April 24, 1955; 70 years ago
- Location: 2425 NASA Parkway Seabrook, Texas 77586 United States
- Website: www.lakewoodyachtclub.com

Lakewood Yacht Club is a yacht club located in Seabrook, Texas, and is a member of the Gulf Yachting Association. The club sits on 38 acres of land, housing six sheds and seven docks. The facilities include over 250 covered slips for power boats and there are an additional 200+ open slips on fixed and floating piers.

In 2021, Lakewood Yacht Club became the first fleet of club-owned RS21 sportboats in the United States.
