= Clear Lake Shores, Texas =

City in Galveston County, Texas

- City
- Motto: "The Yachting Capital of Texas"
- Location of Clear Lake Shores, Texas
- Coordinates: 29°32′47″N 95°1′57″W
- Country: United States
- State: Texas
- County: Galveston

Area
  - Total: 0.71 sq mi (1.85 km^{2})
  - Land: 0.43 sq mi (1.12 km^{2})
  - Water: 0.28 sq mi (0.73 km^{2})
- Elevation: 9.8 ft (3 m)

Population (2020)
  - Total: 1,258
  - Density: 2,910/sq mi (1,120/km^{2})
- Time zone: UTC-6 (Central (CST))
  - Summer (DST): UTC-5 (CDT)
- ZIP code: 77565
- Area code: 281
- FIPS code: 48-15328
- GNIS feature ID: 1332954
- Website: www.clearlakeshores-tx.gov

Clear Lake Shores is a city in Galveston County, Texas, United States, located within the Houston–Pasadena–The Woodlands metropolitan area. As of the 2020 census, the city population was 1,258.

== History ==
During the oil boom years of the 1920s, developers began to sell properties around the Clear Lake estuary as waterfront recreational retreats. The new development was named "Clear Lake Shores". Though the development was initially successful, the Great Depression halted most of the area's growth.

After World War II the area began to redevelop with increasing numbers of permanent residents (as opposed to simply weekend residents). The town was incorporated in 1962 and has since continued to be primarily residential with a small, tourism-focused business community.

In September 2008, the eye of Hurricane Ike hit and destroyed many homes.

== Geography ==
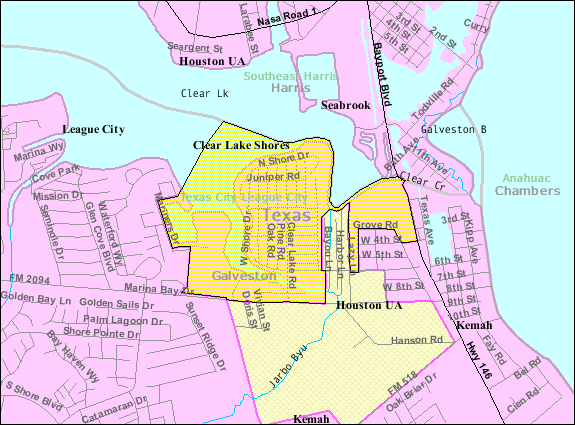
Map of Clear Lake Shores

Clear Lake Shores is located at 29°32′47″N 95°1′57″W (29.546493, –95.032605) and is part of the Clear Lake Area.

According to the United States Census Bureau, the city has a total area of 0.6 square miles (1.6 km^{2}), of which 0.5 square miles (1.3 km^{2}) is land and 0.2 square miles (0.52 km^{2}), or 27.69%, is water.

All Clear Lake Shores addresses share the 77565 zip code with the city of Kemah.

== Demographics ==
Historical population
Census	Pop.	Note	%±
1970	721		—
1980	755		4.7%
1990	1,096		45.2%
2000	1,205		9.9%
2010	1,063		−11.8%
2020	1,258		18.3%
U.S. Decennial Census

=== 2020 census ===
As of the 2020 census, Clear Lake Shores had a population of 1,258 people living in 600 households, including 341 families, and the median age was 53.1 years; 13.9% of residents were under the age of 18 and 22.2% were 65 years of age or older, with 99.4 males for every 100 females and 98.4 males for every 100 females age 18 and over.

100.0% of residents lived in urban areas, while 0% lived in rural areas.

There were 600 households in Clear Lake Shores, of which 22.0% had children under the age of 18 living in them. Of all households, 50.3% were married-couple households, 19.7% were households with a male householder and no spouse or partner present, and 21.3% were households with a female householder and no spouse or partner present. About 28.5% of all households were made up of individuals and 11.3% had someone living alone who was 65 years of age or older.

There were 667 housing units, of which 10.0% were vacant. Among occupied housing units, 77.3% were owner-occupied and 22.7% were renter-occupied. The homeowner vacancy rate was 2.1% and the rental vacancy rate was 11.1%.

Racial composition as of the 2020 census
Race	Number	Percent
White	1,102	87.6%
Black or African American	11	0.9%
American Indian and Alaska Native	6	0.5%
Asian	20	1.6%
Native Hawaiian and Other Pacific Islander	3	0.2%
Some other race	25	2.0%
Two or more races	91	7.2%
Hispanic or Latino (of any race)	102	8.1%

=== 2000 census ===
As of the census of 2000, there were 1,205 people, 590 households, and 338 families residing in the city. The population density was 2,581.9 inhabitants per square mile (996.9/km^{2}). There were 661 housing units at an average density of 1,416.3 per square mile (546.8/km^{2}). The racial makeup of the city was 1143 (94.85%) White, 4 (0.33%) African American, 4 (0.33%) Native American, 9 (0.75%) Asian, 12 (1.00%) from other races, and 33 (2.74%) from two or more races. Hispanic or Latino of any race were 40 (3.32%) of the population.

There were 590 households, out of which 20.5% had children under the age of 18 living with them, 45.8% were married couples living together, 7.1% had a female householder with no husband present, and 42.7% were non-families. 35.4% of all households were made up of individuals, and 6.3% had someone living alone who was 65 years of age or older. The average household size was 2.04 and the average family size was 2.60.

In the city, the population was spread out, with 16.7% under the age of 18, 5.1% from 18 to 24, 29.5% from 25 to 44, 40.0% from 45 to 64, and 8.8% who were 65 years of age or older. The median age was 44 years. For every 100 females, there were 103.9 males. For every 100 females age 18 and over, there were 108.3 males.

The median income for a household in the city was $67,500, and the median income for a family was $86,450. Males had a median income of $65,375 versus $41,563 for females. The per capita income for the city was $41,347. About 3.0% of families and 4.2% of the population were below the poverty line, including 0.5% of those under age 18 and 7.5% of those age 65 or over.

== Government and infrastructure ==
Clear Lake Shores has a police department. The Kemah Volunteer Fire Department, with its facility in Kemah, serves Clear Lake Shores.

As per a governmental agreement, Clear Lake Shores receives animal services from the Galveston County Animal Resource Center, an animal shelter operated by the Galveston County Health District in Texas City. This became the case on October 1, 2022. Previously Bayou Animal Services, based in Dickinson, was the animal control service for Clear Lake Shores. Clear Lake Shores had switched from the health district's animal services to Bayou in 2015.

Galveston Area Ambulance Authority (GAAA), also operated by the health district, provides EMS services to this municipality.

=== Parks and recreation ===
The Jennie Marie Park is tiny and showcases a mobile sculpture made of colorful birdhouses.

Another park is Deep Hole Park, and though small, it is a place where people fish since it is next to the water.

== Education ==
Clear Lake Shores is served by the Clear Creek Independent School District. The community is within the Board of Trustees District 1, represented by Laura DuPont.

Pupils are zoned to Stewart Elementary School (formerly Kemah Elementary School) in Kemah, Bayside Intermediate School in League City, and Clear Falls High School in League City. Previously residents were zoned to League City Intermediate School in League City, and Clear Creek High School in League City.

Residents of the Galveston County portion of Clear Creek ISD (and therefore Clear Lake Shores) are zoned to the College of the Mainland, a community college in Texas City.

== See also ==
- Clear Lake (region)
