= Clear Lake (Galveston Bay) =

Lake in Texas, United States

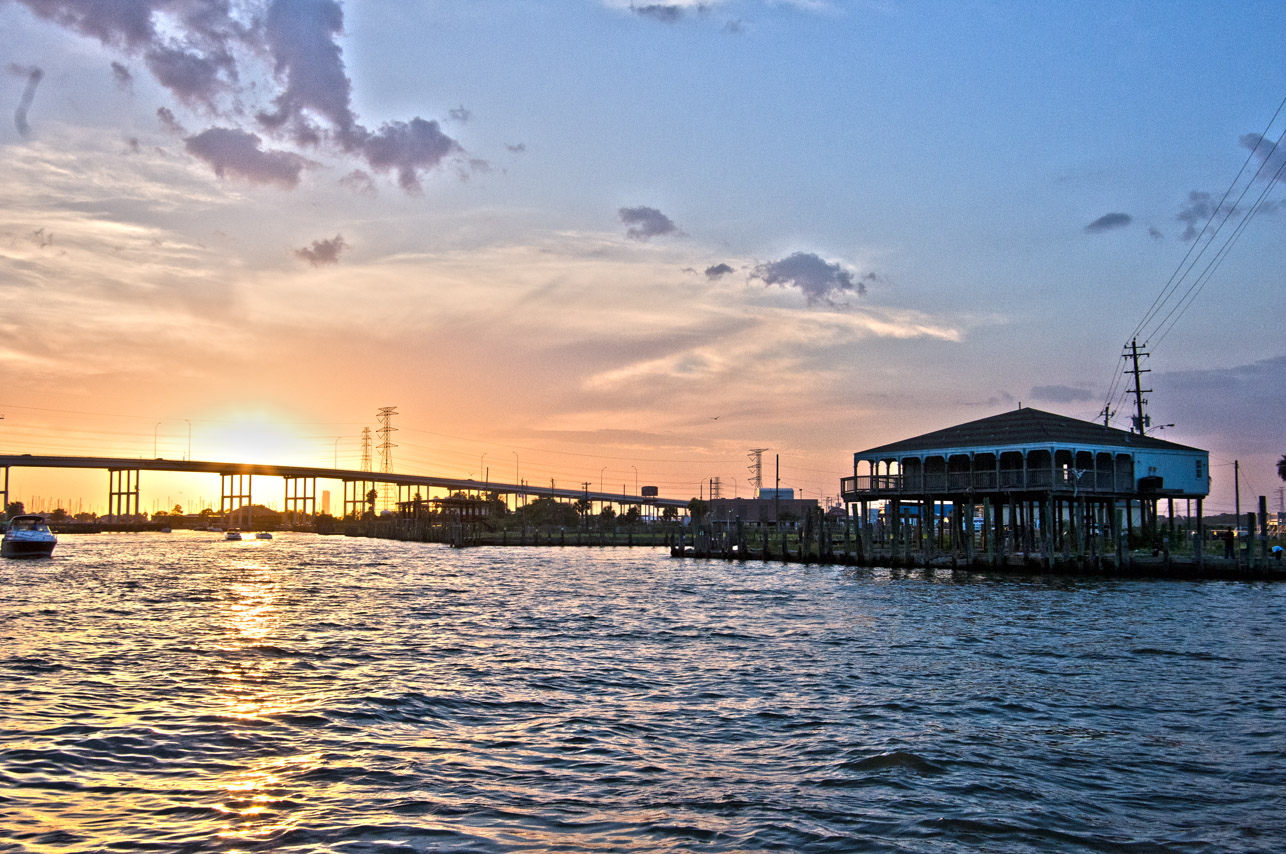
- Sunset over the channel from Clear Lake to Galveston Bay

- Location within Texas Location within the United States
- Location: Between Houston and Galveston Bay
- Coordinates: 29°34′20″N 95°2′37″W
- Primary inflows: Lake Nassau, Clear Creek
- Primary outflows: Galveston Bay
- Basin countries: United States

Clear Lake is a brackish harbor located near Houston, Texas, U.S., in Harris County. The lake feeds Galveston Bay. It is bordered by Houston (Clear Lake City), Pasadena, League City, Clear Lake Shores, Taylor Lake Village, Seabrook and El Lago, Texas. NASA's Johnson Space Center lies near its shores.

The lake is a major recreation center and home to one of the largest concentrations of recreational boats and marinas in the nation. The communities surrounding the lake, known collectively as the Clear Lake Area, contain a large base of tourism and high-tech businesses.
