= Cox =

Cox or COX may refer to:

== Companies ==
- Cox Enterprises, a media and communications company
  - Cox Communications, cable provider
  - Cox Media Group, a company that owns television and radio stations
  - Cox Automotive, an Atlanta-based business unit of Cox Enterprises
- Cox Models, aka Cox Hobbies
- Cox Sports, a regional sports network that served the United States New England region until 2012

== Places ==
=== Antarctica ===
- Cox Glacier
- Cox Nunatak
- Cox Peaks
- Cox Point
- Cox Reef

=== United States ===
- Cox, Florida
- Cox, Missouri
- Cox College (Georgia), a defunct private women's college located in College Park, Georgia
- Cox College (Missouri), a private college in Springfield, Missouri
- Cox Furniture Store, c. 1890, a historic site in Gainesville, Florida
- Cox Furniture Warehouse, a historic site in Gainesville, Florida
- Cox Run, a tributary of Little Muncy Creek in Lycoming County, Pennsylvania
- Cox site

=== Elsewhere ===
- Cox Island, Canada
- Cox, Haute-Garonne, France
- Cox, Alicante, Spain
- Cox Peninsula, Australia

== Science and technology ==
- Cyclooxygenase (COX), an enzyme
- Cytochrome c oxidase, an enzyme
- C_{OX}, oxide capacitance in MOSFET devices
- Cox model, a proportional hazards model in statistics
- Cox model engines, made by L.M. Cox Manufacturing Inc. and later Cox Hobbies
- Cox process, a point process in probability theory

== Other uses ==
- abbreviation of coxswain (rowing), a member of a boat crew
- Cox's Orange Pippin, a variety of apple also known as Cox in Britain
- an abbreviation of Cox's Criminal Cases, British law reports
- Cox (novel), a 2016 novel by Christoph Ransmayr
- Cox (surname)

== See also ==
- Cox & Kings, a travel agency derived from two firms of regimental agents in British India
- Cox Bluff (disambiguation)
- Cox Center (disambiguation)
- Cox Creek (disambiguation)
- Cox Green (disambiguation)
- Cox House (disambiguation)
- Cox Lake (disambiguation)
- Cox River (disambiguation)
- Cox Town (disambiguation)
- Cox's, a former department store in Pittsburgh, Pennsylvania, United States
- Cox's Road (disambiguation)
- Cock (disambiguation)
