= Cox House =

Cox House may refer to:

== United States ==
(by state then city)

=== Arizona to New York ===
- William Cox Building, Casa Grande, Arizona, listed on the National Register of Historic Places (NRHP) in Pinal County
- Cox House (Morrilton, Arkansas), NRHP-listed in Conway County
- Cox House (Denver, Colorado), a Denver Landmark at 3417 Lowell Boulevard
- Cox Gargoyle House, Denver, Colorado, a Denver Landmark at 3425 Lowell Boulevard
- George H. Cox House, Bloomington, Illinois, NRHP-listed in McLean County
- Cox House (Julien, Kentucky), listed on the NRHP in Christian County
- Carrie Gaulbert Cox and Attilla Cox, Jr. House, Louisville, Kentucky, listed on the NRHP in Jefferson County
- Cox-Hord House, Maysville, Kentucky, NRHP-listed in Mason County
- Alvey Cox House, Munfordville, Kentucky, listed on the NRHP in Kentucky
- John Cox House, Nebo, Kentucky, listed on the NRHP in Kentucky
- L. 0. Cox House, Owenton, Kentucky, listed on the NRHP in Kentucky
- Shelburne-Cox House, Taylorsville, Kentucky, listed on the NRHP in Kentucky
- Gedney and Cox Houses, Salem, Massachusetts, NRHP-listed
- Eugene Saint Julien Cox House, St. Peter, Minnesota, NRHP-listed
- Foxx-Cox House, Bogue Chitto, Mississippi, listed on the NRHP in Mississippi
- Cox-Uithoven House, Columbus, Mississippi, listed on the NRHP in Mississippi
- Mary Etta Cox House, Barnegat, New Jersey, listed on the NRHP in New Jersey
- Gardner Cox House, Hannawa Falls, New York, listed on the NRHP in New York
- Richard Cox House, Mattituck, New York, listed on the NRHP in New York
- Cox Farmhouse, Rhinebeck, New York, listed on the NRHP in New York
- Isaac Cox Cobblestone Farmstead, Scottsville, New York, listed on the NRHP in New York

=== North Carolina to West Virginia ===
- Mary Mills Coxe House, Hendersonville, North Carolina, listed on the NRHP in North Carolina
- Cox-Ange House, Winterville, North Carolina, listed on the NRHP in North Carolina
- Bower-Cox House, Scottville, North Carolina, listed on the NRHP in North Carolina
- Samuel Cox House, Scottville, North Carolina, listed on the NRHP in North Carolina
- George B. Cox House, Cincinnati, Ohio, NRHP-listed
- Jacob D. Cox House, Cincinnati, Ohio, NRHP-listed
- Cox–Williams House, St. Helens, Oregon
- Hewson Cox House, West Whiteland, Pennsylvania, listed on the NRHP in Pennsylvania
- Cox House (Franklin, Tennessee), listed on the NRHP in Tennessee
- Owen-Cox House, Brentwood, Tennessee, listed on the NRHP in Williamson County, Tennessee
- Andrew M. Cox Ranch Site, Austin, Texas, NRHP-listed
- Cox–Craddock House, Austin, Texas, listed on the NRHP in Texas
- Everitt–Cox House, Lufkin, Texas, listed on the NRHP in Texas
- Silas Cox House, Beaver, Utah, listed on the NRHP in Utah
- Cox-Shoemaker-Parry House, Manti, Utah, listed on the NRHP in Utah
- Dr. Virgil Cox House, Galax, Virginia, listed on the NRHP in Virginia
- Cox-Morton House, Charleston, West Virginia, listed on the NRHP in West Virginia
- Cox-Parks House, Charleston, West Virginia, listed on the NRHP in West Virginia
- Judge Frank Cox House, Morgantown, West Virginia, listed on the NRHP in West Virginia

== See also ==
- Cox (disambiguation)
