= Richard Viguerie =

American conservative figure (born 1933)

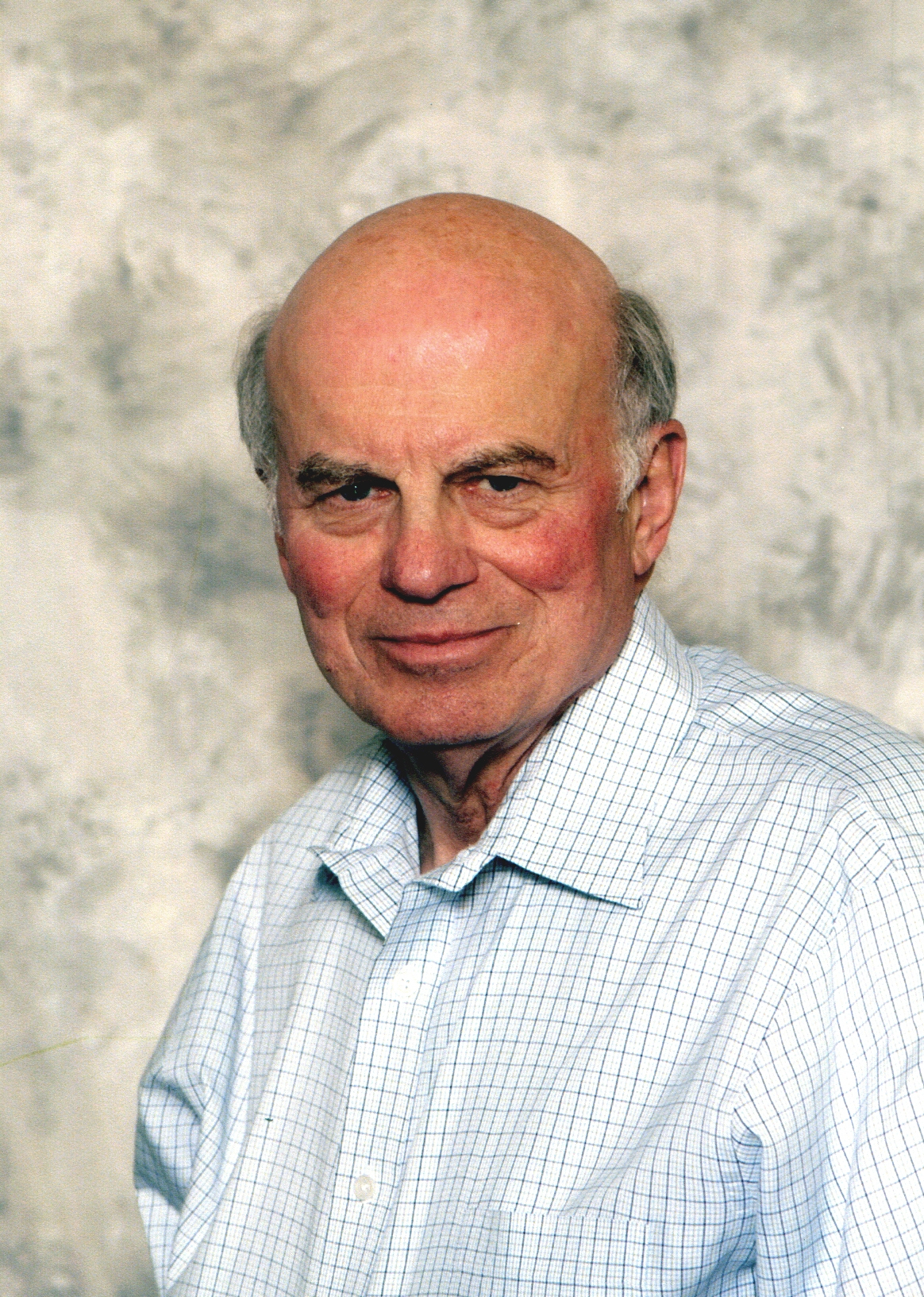
- Born: Richard Art Viguerie; September 23, 1933 (age 93); Golden Acres, Texas, U.S.
- Education: University of Houston
- Occupations: direct mail marketing advertising magazine publisher
- Spouse: Elaine O. Viguerie
- Children: 3
- Website: conservativehq.com

Richard Art Viguerie (/ˈvɪɡəri/; born September 23, 1933) is an American conservative figure, pioneer of political direct mail and writer on politics. He is the current chairman of ConservativeHQ.com.

== Life and career ==
Viguerie was born in Golden Acres, Texas, the son of Elizabeth (née Stoufflet) and Arthur Camile Viguerie. He has Cajun ancestry. His father worked as a middle-management executive for a petrochemical company, and his mother was a practical nurse. Neither of his parents were interested in politics.

Viguerie recalled what caused him to become political "was when MacArthur was fired. I was tremendously frustrated and outraged, and mad as heck at Truman... What cemented my conservative philosophy was Joe McCarthy... I was a young kid and had read Bill Buckley and one or two other books. I believed in what McCarthy did. Even when he was inaccurate, he articulated the concern about a very big problem. There are Communists in this world and that is not a figment of a few right-wingers' imaginations."

In 1957 Viguerie graduated from the University of Houston. He dropped out of law school. He served in the army reserves for six months, after which he worked as a clerk in a small oil company.

Viguerie worked for the Christian evangelist Billy James Hargis in his early career. In an autobiographical note, Viguerie wrote that in 1961 he became executive secretary of the conservative youth group Young Americans for Freedom: "Since 1965, owner of direct marketing/advertising companies such as American Target Advertising. Political/campaign strategist, activist and conservative spokesman and writer."

Viguerie has been dubbed the "funding father" of modern conservative strategy in the United States by some sources. Viguerie does not charge standard fees and expenses from his clients, rather he offers a no-loss guarantee and demands a commission (sometimes as much as 50%) and insists on keeping clients mailing lists for future, creating an extensive conservative donor database.

Viguerie founded Conservative Digest magazine in 1975 and served as its publisher for ten years. Opposing President Gerald Ford's election, Viguerie in 1976 unsuccessfully sought the vice-presidential nomination of the American Independent Party, which had been formed eight years earlier by George Wallace.

Viguerie's development and honing of national direct mail campaigns in the mid-to-late 1970s was considered revolutionary in its approach and was quickly adopted by insurgent conservative political campaigns. Conservative activist and political candidate Jeff Bell applied the strategy in 1978 to unseat longtime liberal Republican Senator Clifford Case in the 1978 New Jersey primary. Bell was defeated in the general election, but his unexpected primary victory was considered a turning point for conservative activist efforts against establishment Republicans.

== Political activity ==
=== Texas Young Republicans ===
In 1952 and 1956, as a young Republican, Viguerie volunteered for Dwight D. Eisenhower’s presidential campaigns in Texas. In 1960, when Republican John Tower ran for Senate against Lyndon Johnson, he served as Tower’s Houston campaign manager. Johnson ran for both the Senate seat and the vice presidency, and he won both. When Johnson vacated his Senate seat to become Vice President, Viguerie helped Tower in the subsequent run-off, which Tower won (becoming the first Republican Senator in Texas history).

=== 1964 Goldwater support ===
Senator Barry Goldwater publicly criticized the Republican establishment, including President Eisenhower (viewed by the American public as the World War II liberator of Europe). In 1960, Goldwater called Eisenhower's domestic program "a dime store New Deal." With ghostwriter L. Brent Bozell Jr., Goldwater published The Conscience of a Conservative, saying its purpose was "to awaken the American people to a realization of how far we had moved from the old constitutional concepts toward the new welfare state." The book, calling for a return to conservative principles and a harder stance on communism, inspired many young conservatives, including Viguerie.

In July 1960, when it seemed that Richard Nixon's Republican Party nomination for president was a foregone conclusion, conservatives tried to shape the party's platform to influence him away from what they saw as Eisenhower moderation. They also hoped to convince Nixon to choose either Barry Goldwater or Walter Judd as his running mate. When their attempts all failed and Nixon choose moderate Henry Cabot Lodge Jr., they saw it as pandering to a liberal consensus represented by New York Governor Nelson Rockefeller. Some conservatives even believed that this outcome was proof that the Republican Party would never change and they would need to look elsewhere if conservatism was to succeed. Though still in Texas, Viguerie would later recall his distaste over the situation, saying "I never was a Nixon fan."

In September 1960 a group of young conservative activists met at "Great Elm", the estate of the family of William F. Buckley Jr. in Sharon, Connecticut. The produced a short exposition of their vision of conservative principles and how they should be implemented which was known as the Sharon Statement. This group of activists would take up the name Young Americans for Freedom.

In August, 1961 Viguerie became executive secretary of Young Americans for Freedom. Viguerie would later recall, "I moved to New York, where their offices were. That was no small thing for me, a Texas kid. I lived in Greenwich Village. I had a great time and went to a lot of parties. The conservatives and socialists were two extremes and found and solicited each other's company. I hung around the White Horse, and lived around the corner on St. Marks Place. I knew [democratic socialist] Michael Harrington quite well, and saw Bill Buckley and Bill Rusher. Things were loose and free then, none of the uptightness of the later sixties and seventies. We had a lotta fun."

In the role of executive secretary of Young Americans for Freedom Viguerie gained relationships with William F. Buckley, William A. Rusher, Frank Meyer, and other conservative intellectuals. Viguerie later recalled that inspired by these thinkers "I tried to get as caught up as I could in the classics of conservative thought, but it didn't take long for me to realize I’d never really catch up. ...[I realized] what we didn’t have were marketers. I made a conscious decision to fill that niche—that hole in the marketplace—by immersing myself in the study of marketing for the next 10 years." That year, F. Clifton White began travelling the nation exhorting conservatives to gain control of their local Republican Party organizations so they could elect conservative delegates to the Republican National Convention during the next electoral season.

Viguerie's Young Americans for Freedom (YAF), had been founded by William F. Buckley Jr. and would play an important role in helping Goldwater secure the Republican nomination. On March 7, 1962 Viguerie and the YAF held a sold out event entitled "A Conservative Rally for World Liberation from Communism" at Madison Square Garden in New York City attended by 18,500 mostly young people with senators John Tower, Strom Thurmond, and Goldwater as featured speakers. Viguerie would later write of his opinion of the event, saying "I would nominate the Madison Square Garden rally as the day the modern conservative movement had its public debut. Before that day, what we in the conservative movement were doing was mostly out of the public eye. But when thousands were lined up around Madison Square Garden and the speeches and sellout crowd were front-page, 'above the fold' news the next day in The New York Times, the conservative movement leapt onto the national political stage — and it was a movement largely inspired by Goldwater and the new brand of conservatism he shared with intellectuals such as William F. Buckley, Jr., M. Stanton Evans, Russell Kirk, Frank S. Meyer, William F. Rusher and L. Brent Bozell Jr."

In late 1962 YAF moved their headquarters to Washington, D.C. Viguerie moved into a house there on Capital Hill with his new bride Elaine O'Leary Viguerie. The organization had racked up $20,000 in debt and Viguerie had to seek donations from wealthy donors on the right such as Eddie Rickenbacker, Charles Edison, and J. Howard Pew. He found this method distasteful, "I realized I didn't want to do that kind of thing, and figured there must be a better way. So, I started raising money by mail, but the secretaries could only write so many letters a day. So I said, there must be a better way than this, and one thing led to another, and I got into direct mail."

Viguerie attended that Republican National Convention, held in San Francisco's Cow Palace, as an alternate delegate. He recalled years later, "I was there at the Cow Palace in 1964. I was in the rafters, where the boos for Rockefeller came from." He also recalled coming across a large group of people surrounding a film star, "It was Ronald Reagan. Two years later, he was the governor there."

Viguerie would later write about the divisive atmosphere in the Republican party after Goldwater's defeat. Conservative members like himself were "Angry...about the criticism verging on sabotage Senator Goldwater received from the Republican establishment" and "insulted...over the personal attacks...received at the hands of establishment Republicans". The main voice for remaining within the Republican party was William F. Buckley a policy Viguerie shared, "we had a sense that even though Goldwater had lost the election, his grassroots support demonstrated that millions of Americans thought he was right on many issues. ...We saw the establishment leadership of the Republican Party as intellectually bankrupt, and we believed that if we could just get the message out, we could [win]."

=== Direct-mail company ===
Though Goldwater lost, Viguerie gained knowledge of the direct-mail strategy and would later become expert in it. In early 1965 he went to the clerk of the U.S. House of Representatives which by law had a record of every donor to a presidential campaign that gave over $50 which it made available for public inspection. Viguerie copied by longhand 12,500 donors that had given to Goldwater's 1964 campaign. This was the beginning of a grass-roots conservative mailing list that would continue to grow throughout Viguerie's career. Viguerie, holding that the mainstream news media was biased, later stated that this strategy allowed conservatism to bypass two obstacles, "Thanks to direct mail, conservatives — and their candidates — were able to become an independent, vibrant force, free of the fetters imposed by the Republican political hierarchy and the liberal media." With only $4,000 in savings he began his direct-mail company "Richard A. Viguerie Company, Inc." His first client was Young Americans for Freedom, but he lost the account within six weeks. According to Viguerie this was due to "one of the frequent upheavals typical of an organization run by a bunch of college kids." The company grew as it found other clients the Conservative Caucus, the Committee for the Survival of a Free Congress, the National Conservative Political Action Committee, the National Right to Work Committee, the American Conservative Union, Sen. Jesse Helms' National Congressional Club and Gun Owners of America. His company also marketed many conservatives seeking elected office including "congressmen Phil Crane and Bob Dornan, Ron Paul, John Ashbrook, Sens. Jesse Helms and Strom Thurmond, California state senator H. L. 'Bill' Richardson, and candidates Max Rafferty, Howard Phillips, Jeff Bell and G. Gordon Liddy."

Viguerie's reputation was such that Senator Robert Griffin recommended that liberal Democratic Senator George McGovern hire him when he was running for re-election in 1967. Vigurie later recalled that he was flattered, "I explained to the good Senator McGovern that we were poles apart ideologically, and he'd want someone more akin with his philosophy. We had a good long chat. At that early date, 1967, he had an appreciation of the power of direct mailing." By the 1970s direct mail would become a strategy used by both of the major political parties in the United States, including the outsider 1972 presidential campaign of George McGovern. The Senator was aided in his pursuit by his policy, beginning in 1970, of signing fund-raising letters for Democratic candidates for which he demanded nothing in return except the names and addresses of the people responding. This created "the famous McGovern list" by which his presidential campaign had a tremendous head start over other Democratic challengers. The head of McGovern's direct-mail campaign, Morris Dees, became a friendly correspondent with Viguerie with each redirecting would-be clients to the other if political leanings are not similar. Dees when approached by George Wallace staffers for a presidential run in 1976, recommended Viguerie. While Viguerie did employ some liberals, they worked "in 'support' work--working with lists, demographic studies, computer operations. …The men at the top, however, are trusted right-wingers like James G. Aldige III."

By June 1975 Viguere, who by then occupied four floors of building in Falls Church, Virginia in suburban Washington, D.C., had come to the attention of New York Magazine. He had hired 250 nonunion employees (with "Full benefits. Good pay.") to "tend slowly turning computer reels, collate and update some 250 mailing lists carrying approximately 10 million names, handle the paper flow, and, most important, create the letters which inspire householders to mail in all that money." At the time Viguerie told the magazine that 15% of his business was in straight political campaigning for candidates, 30% in ideological efforts (such as opposing gun control), and the rest in "health and welfare" matters (such as the "Help Hospitalized Veterans" campaign).

The article estimated that he would "dispatch some 50 million pieces of mail this year" and stated that "he is a phenomenal fund-raiser for conservative and/or populist causes and candidates. Viguerie is Godfather, Idea Man, And Savior to a gathering band of rightists eager to fund their dreams and vexations. …the people who mail $25 million a year to his clients get riled up over school busing, guns, law and order, pornography, permissive education, and the cause of Governor George C. Wallace of Alabama, whom most of them love." The magazine noted that at that point gearing up for the 1976 Presidential campaign he had "raised $3.5 million by direct mail for Wallace, [and] will hit $12 million by next spring".

Direct-mail as a political strategy received a further boost when the Federal Election Campaign Act provided matching funds for small contributions.

=== 1976 presidential primaries ===
In 1976 Viguerie served as a fundraiser for George Wallace's campaign to win the nomination for president of the United States. After Wallace withdrew, Viguerie began to focus on the American Independent Party to oppose Republican President Gerald Ford and Democratic challenger Jimmy Carter. (Ford who had assumed the Presidency on August 9, 1974 when Richard Nixon resigned, had seen his own popularity suffer when on September 8, 1974 he had pardoned ex-president Richard Nixon for his involvement in the Watergate scandal.)

==== George Wallace campaign ====
George Wallace's 1968 presidential candidacy had been the reason the American Independent Party was formed, but he had foregone the party in 1972 to seek the Democratic nomination (in a campaign that ended when he was paralyzed by an assassination attempt). That year the American Independent Party nominated former representative John G. Schmitz of California (a member of the John Birch Society and a former Republican).

In 1976 Wallace had again chosen to seek the Democratic party nomination rather than that of the American Independent Party. Viguerie began fundraising for him, taking in $6 million in donations by the beginning of the year. In February, Viguerie also tried to draft another conservative voice into the Democratic nominations by working to draft Former Texas Gov. John Connally into the race, vowing to donate $20,000 of his own. When contacted by reporters on the move Connally said he had "never heard of it" but refused to rule out accepting such an effort. Viguerie told reporters that he was trying to offset that "The Democratic primary is dominated by liberals, who are all trying to be more liberal than the other."

The Wallace campaign had already come to Viguere in 1973 when he was considering running but was $250,000 in debt. The campaign had a million names of possible donors but fewer than 75,000 had become contributors. The New York Magazine reporting on the campaign's move held that "Viguerie probably has the best political solicitation apparatus in the republic today." He told the magazine that "By the time we're finished, we'll have sent out 19-million pieces and grossed $12 million for Governor Wallace."

Viguere found much to like in Wallace's stances, saying "I'm realizing as each day goes by that George Wallace and I have more in common than I thought. I'd like to see less government in people's lives than Wallace does, but when it comes to social issues, we're together. We agree on busing, law and order, crime, parent control in the public schools, attacking immorality in public life, movies, and television. Why, I pulled my children out of the public schools here because they're too secular and only interested in the life cycle of the salmon. I put them in a private Christian school. I'm with Wallace on antipornography. I've raised millions to fight it. These are the concerns of the client, George Wallace, and we incorporate them in every mailing piece, and we don't miss national defense, either. You see, in an ideological cause like this, people give money not to win friends, but to defeat enemies. You like to change human nature, but you can't--people are more strongly motivated by negative issues than positive ones. When there are no negatives or enemies, the appeal isn't strong. The Democrats know this too. It's hard to pick up an appeal letter of theirs without seeing the name Richard Nixon or Watergate in it."

By Wednesday, June 9, 1976 Governor George Wallace had withdrawn from the Democratic nomination race and placed a call to Jimmy Carter endorsing him. Having anticipated this outcome two days before he told a reporter that he was satisfied with the results of his campaigns because "everybody is now saying what I started out saying back in 1964" and that he had cleared the way for a fellow Southerner like Carter to be accepted as a genuine contender, "There are no longer any real regional differences." Despite conservatives in his own state asking him why he was supporting liberals like Carter and Mondale, Wallace went on to offer speeches in support of Carter's presidential bid.

==== American Independent Party campaign ====
Ever since Goldwater's defeat some among Conservative circles had advocated leaving the Republican Party (which they held to be too liberal) to make a conservative third party. After Watergate, Viguerie also held that there was no hope for the Republican party, telling a reporter "I know the marketing field and you just can't market 'Republican' any more. It means depression, recession, runaway inflation, big business, multinational corporations, Watergate, and Nixon. It's easier to sell an Edsel or Typhoid Mary. 'Independent' and 'American'--those are words which will sell. Don't kid yourself. That's the way we're moving. All the Republican party needs is a decent burial. In ten years, there won't be a dozen people in the country calling themselves Republicans. …Nixon, whose name is poison to voters now, wiped out every issue the Republicans could use--balanced budget, morality in government, law and order, national security. Richard Nixon flushed them all down the commode."

Viguerie told a reporter that he was sure that Americans would elect a conservative if presented the truth, saying "I figure that 80% of the American public would vote conservative if we had a neutral press. The whole liberal philosophy is bankrupt. Public schools are a disaster and will become a major campaign issue in two years, over who is going to have the say over children--parents, or the professional educators. The liberal foreign policy is in a total shambles. The evidence is what's happening in Portugal, Southeast Asia, our declining military posture. But the press is protecting the liberals. The Republicans make it easy for them by echoing the same thing." To back up his position he pointed to Gallup polls that showed that while only 17% of Americans called themselves Republicans, 62% called themselves conservatives. He was heartened by another Gallup poll that showed that 25% of the electorate favored the formation of a new conservative party.

Giving up on the Republicans, Viguerie moved on to become one of the main organizers of the American Independent Party convention in Chicago meeting in August. At the opening of the convention a party platform was agreed on that declared their opposition for several ideas including the Equal Rights Amendment, amnesty for draft dodgers, the individual income tax, legalized abortion, forced busing, foreign aid, membership in the United Nations, and gun control. It was felt that the platform would attract conservatives away from the major parties. The convention's keynote speaker denounced "atheistical political Zionism".

Viguerie was a leader among a group of nationally prominent conservatives known as the New Right. Feeling that President Ford was insufficiently conservative and upset that the Republican party had not given the nomination to Ronald Reagan instead, they attended the convention in an effort to take over the party and remake it as a vehicle to create a new conservative coalition. In this effort Viguerie was joined by William A. Rusher, publisher of National Review, Howard Phillips leader of the activist organisation The Conservative Caucus and former head of the Office of Economic Opportunity, and religious conservative Paul Weyrich. They argued that the party was seen as a fringe group but should become the philosophical home for believers in free enterprise and traditional moral values. They hoped to attract former Governor Ronald Reagan if he did not succeed in wresting the Republican nomination from President Ford. If they could not secure Reagan they hoped to attract other nationally known conservatives such as Senator Jesse Helms, Governor Meldrim Thomson Jr., Representative Philip Crane, former Governor John Connally, antifeminist activist Phyllis Schlafly, or Ellen McCormack (who had run an anti-abortion campaign in the Democratic Presidential primary earlier that year) to head the ticket for the party. When none of these figures agreed to switch parties Viguerie's group had to resort to promoting Dallas columnist Robert J. Morris. Viguerie ran as Morris' Vice President choice, promising to use his direct-mail expertise to raise a big budget for the national campaign and to turn over his mailing lists to the party.

For several months Rusher had promised American Independent Party members a nationally known Conservative, promises he continued to make up until two weeks before the convention. When Rusher, Viguerie, and Phillips failed to produce a well-known Conservative, party veterans led by its founder William K. Shearer rebuffed their vision to reform and modernize the party into what Rusher styled as the New Majority Party. The front-runner going into the convention was former Georgia governor and staunch segregationist Lester Maddox (previously a Democrat) with his colorful personality being viewed as a positive that could draw media attention and help the party reach the threshold of five percent of the national vote that would secure it federal funding.

In protest of the proceedings that seemed to be handing the nomination to Maddox, Rusher and Viguerie were among those who did not attend the Saturday session where the voting took place. On the first ballot the party chose Maddox as its presidential nominee - beating challengers Morris and former Louisiana representative John Rarick (previously a Democrat). Shearer had hoped to get his wife Eileen nominated as the vice presidential candidate, but the idea was opposed by Maddox, who expressed his dislike of the idea of running with a woman. Shortly before the vote Maddox endorsed former mayor of Madison, Wisconsin William Dyke (previously a Republican who had been that party's nominee for Wisconsin governor in 1974) for vice president candidate, which caused Eileen to withdraw. Dyke, who beat Viguerie for the vice presidential slot, had gained fame in Conservative circles for a hard-line stand against student unrest at the University of Wisconsin (which included the Sterling Hall bombing) during the Vietnam War. Late in the afternoon Dyke addressed the convention before the vote by telephone, telling them that "America is the last hope for the preservation of freedom in the world." Before that year Dyke had no prior affiliation with the party and was woken up at 3 am by delegates who informed him in person of the nomination which he was happy to accept. Dyke admitted to reporters that he did not have a full understanding of the party's platform, and when asked if his racial policies were segregationist like Maddox's replied "Certainly not. I'm not a segregationist," and that he didn't believe in the "simplistic definition of segregation".

In the closing hour of the convention a resolution was made that the party pledge itself to "interracial harmony", the resolution was defeated by a voice vote. With Maddox at the top of the ticket the party was seen as running on the themes of "segregation, isolationism and repeal of big government." Viguerie told a reporter at the time that he was "shocked and disillusioned" that they would nominate a man who still calls himself a segregationist, and that the party had consigned itself into being a "perpetual fringe group." Rusher joined Viguerie in refusing to support the party's ticket headed by Maddox, telling reporters "What I object to is his comedic air," and "This party has turned inward, backward, and downward." Party founder Shearer contrasted the original vision for the party with that of the New Right saying the party "has its roots in the George Wallace movement. ...[when Wallace] closed his eyes he saw farmers jumping off of flat-bed cotton trucks and workers pouring out of factories. The right-wing conservative Republicans see a super-educated, highly affluent, country club people. ...Lester Maddox has the George Wallace base. The delegates saw that, they gave use the candidate who can roll up a big vote. He's going to put this party on the map." Shearer, when considering Viguerie's faction said that the "New Right" conservatives fail because they think they are "too good to just get down and commune with the average people across the country." He held that by thwarting the New Right the party had escaped dire peril, like "a girl that's being targeted for a rape that didn't come off." Maddox would go on to win only 170,531 votes in the general election (0.2 percent of the national vote) losing to fellow former Georgia governor Jimmy Carter.

=== Asian Children's Relief Fund ===
In 1977 the New York Attorney General's office began procedures against the Korean Cultural and Freedom Foundation that had employed Viguerie. Attorney General Louis J. Lefkowitz charged that the group (previously accused of links to the South Korean Central Intelligence Agency) had siphoned off the majority of $1.5 million in donations collected in 1975 for Southeast Asian children. New York's Board of Social Welfare's audit found that $920,302 was paid to The Richard A. Viguerie Co., that had solicited donations by mail. Attorney General Lefkowitz held that the fund-raising literature was "calculated to deceive the contributing public into believing that the greater portion of the money contributed would be expended for the specified program services." The direct-mail campaign was called the "Asian Children's Relief Fund" and pleaded for donations to help children with "terminal forms of malnutrition", declaring "that the lives of 350,000 severely malnourished boys and girls [are] threatened unless immediate help is provided." The audit found that of the $1.5 million raised only $31,015 went to six orphanages in South Vietnam and South Korea. The Korean Cultural and Freedom Foundation who had commissioned the direct-mail campaign had a stated goal of the containment of communism in Asia and its president was Bo Hi Pak, a former South Korean Intelligence officer who worked as a principal aide and interpreter with Unification Church founder Sun Myung Moon. The church denied any association with the foundation.

=== Association with the Unification Church ===
In the early 1980s Viguerie worked for groups controlled by the Unification Church under the leadership of Sun Myung Moon. This began in 1981 after Ronald Reagan had won the presidency and the effectiveness of Viguerie's direct mail approach faded, as it had been geared to rally conservatives who felt they had been unfairly sidelined. Viguerie was among several conservative activists that entered into associations with the Unification Church at this time as conservative donors feeling their party was in the ascendancy stopped giving. Reverend Moon's attache Bo Hi Pak purchased the Tyson's Corner office building owned by Viguerie's firm for $10 million and took over its maintenance and administration. The church also hired Viguerie to operate direct-mail functions for some of their church-backed groups such as American Freedom Coalition and subscription solicitations for the church owned The Washington Times. Viguerie (a Catholic) told The Washington Post "Their religion is not my religion, but I have found them to be good, decent people who are strongly anti-communist. I don't see any reason not to work with them."

=== Campaign for Lieutenant Governor of Virginia ===
Viguerie sought the Republican nomination for Lieutenant Governor of Virginia in 1985, but did not receive the nomination at the GOP state convention.

=== Later works ===
Asked by Campaigns and Elections in May 2000 what his immediate goals were, Viguerie answered:

To use the Internet to involve Americans in the political process, to help conservatives gain an advantage over the left. To fight against government's use of power, to fight for individual rights and responsibilities, and to fight to extend the blessings of liberty throughout the world.

Writing in The Nation, David Corn noted that Viguerie "raised money for Judicial Watch" and is associated with Larry Klayman, a conservative lawyer and activist who had been a failed candidate for the Republican nomination for US Senate in Florida in 2004.

Viguerie has long been associated with conservative activist Howard Phillips through creation of the Moral Majority in 1979.

According to CharityWatch.org: "[Roger] Chapin hired his long-time friend and direct mail expert, Richard Viguerie, to conduct fundraising campaigns for HHV, paying Viguerie's company $14 million between 2000 and 2005." HHV is a charity run by Roger Chapin, which according to Charity Watch has made many questionable and apparently unethical payments unrelated to its purported mission.

In May 2006 Viguerie said regarding the ability of conservatives to maintain a majority in the U.S. House and Senate, "There is a growing feeling among conservatives that the only way to cure the problem is for Republicans to lose the Congressional elections this fall."

Viguerie commented on the Mark Foley scandal, "This isn't an isolated situation. It is only the most recent example of Republican House leaders doing whatever it takes to hold onto power. If it means spending billions of taxpayers' dollars on questionable projects, they'll do it. If it means covering up the most despicable actions of a colleague, they'll do it."

Viguerie fought for the Legislative Transparency and Accountability Act of 2007 through his petition website called Grassroots Freedom.

When Viguerie spoke at a conference of Libertarian Party state chairs in March 2007, he said of the 2006 United States general elections, "Whenever conservatives are unhappy, bad things happen for the Republican Party."

In 2007 Viguerie co-founded the American Freedom Agenda, described as "a coalition established to restore checks and balances and civil liberties protections under assault by the executive branch."

In January 2008, Viguerie launched ultimateronpaul.com, a website designed to promote the 2008 presidential candidacy of U.S. Congressman Ron Paul, whom Viguerie described as "truly a principled conservative in the grand tradition of Robert A. Taft, Barry Goldwater, and Ronald Reagan" and who "has differentiated himself from all the other candidates, whose allegiance is to Big Government Republicanism."

In a July 2009 article for Sojourners Magazine entitled "When Governments Kill," Viguerie spoke strongly against capital punishment, calling for a moratorium on it to discuss its surrounding issues, hoping that will pave a path to abolition.

== Books ==
External videos
- Booknotes interview with Viguerie on America's Right Turn, September 4, 2005, C-SPAN
- Presentation by Viguerie on Conservatives Betrayed, July 7, 2007, C-SPAN
- Presentation by Viguerie on Takeover, April 10, 2014, C-SPAN
- Presentation by Viguerie on Takeover, July 11, 2014, C-SPAN

Books by Viguerie include:

- The New Right: We're Ready to Lead (1981)
- The Establishment vs. the People: Is a New Populist Revolt on the Way? (1983)
- America's Right Turn: How Conservatives Used New and Alternative Media to Take Power (2004)
- Conservatives Betrayed: How George W. Bush and Other Big Government Republicans Hijacked the Conservative Cause (2006)
- Takeover: The 100-Year War for the Soul of the GOP and How Conservatives Can Finally Win it, (2014)

== Family ==
Viguerie and his wife have three children and (as of 2011) six grandchildren.

== See also ==
- American Life League
- Judie Brown
