= Cox Bluff =

Cox Bluff may refer to:

- Cox Bluff (Antarctica)
- Cox Bluff (Tasmania)

== See also ==
- Cox (disambiguation)
