= Macroplaza Mall =

Dead mall in Pasadena, Texas, U.S.

- Location: Pasadena, Texas, United States
- Coordinates: 29.6945675°N 95.1994003°W
- Address: 1101 Southmore Avenue
- Opened: March 4, 1982; 44 years ago
- Closed: c. 2026 (enclosed mall)
- Previous names: Pasadena Town Square Mall; Plaza Paseo Mall
- Developer: Federated Stores Realty
- Owner: 2015 Shopping Mall Business LLC
- Num. of stores: 1 as of 2025
- Num. of anchor tenants: 4 (all vacant)
- Floor area: 335,840 square feet (31,201 m^{2})
- Floors: 1 (2 in former Dillard's, former Macy's, and former Sears)

Macroplaza Mall, formerly Pasadena Town Square Mall and Plaza Paseo Mall, was a regional shopping mall in Pasadena, Texas, southeast of Houston. Developed by Federated Stores Realty, the real-estate arm of Federated Department Stores (now Macy’s Inc.) and attached to an existing Foley's Department store, it opened in March 1982.

== History ==
The mall originally featured Joske's, Foley's, and Palais Royal (Houston-based department store) as its anchor stores. At the time it was built, its location was unusual as it was one of only a few malls in the Houston area not near a highway. Joske's was rebranded as Dillard's in 1987 following the purchase of the Joske's chain. Sears was added as the fourth anchor in 1997 in an effort to increase traffic; and allow the mall to be seen as a larger regional mall. All four Anchor Stores Dillard's, Sears, Macy's, and Palais Royal (department store) currently sit vacant.

A little more than a year after opening, mall developer Federated Department Stores Realty sold the mall, and three others, to mall manager JMB Realty Corporation for $112 million. In 2002, the mall was purchased from American General by a local developer. Foley's converted to Macy's in 2006, the same year Dillard's closed. Macy's closed on March 27, 2017.

In 2015 the mall was purchased by Guardian Equity, which planned to remodel the common spaces. In 2016 it was renamed Plaza Paseo Mall.

In mid-2018, its name was again changed to Macroplaza Mall, to allude to it being a gathering place like the plaza of the same name to the south in Monterrey, Mexico, and to emphasize a new focus on the area's Mexican American community.

Palais Royal closed in 2020 when its parent company Stage Stores filed for bankruptcy.

On November 9, 2020, it was announced that Sears would close on January 24, 2021, as part of a plan to close seven Sears stores nationwide, leaving the mall with no anchor stores. It was revealed afterward the store would be converted and reopened as the smaller-format Sears Hometown store, but closed in May 2022.

== Redevelopment and closure ==
Following the closure of Sears Hometown in May 2022, the mall continued to decline, with most of its retail space becoming vacant.

In 2025, plans were announced to redevelop the property into a mixed-use development known as Pasadena Square. The proposed redevelopment includes healthcare facilities, retail space, offices, housing, restaurants and public green spaces.

The enclosed shopping mall reportedly ceased operations in 2026, although the exact date of its permanent closure has not been confirmed.

On October 30, 2026, Harris Health held a wall-breaking ceremony at the former Pasadena Town Square Mall to mark the redevelopment of the former Dillard's department store into the Pasadena Square Health Center. The $75 million project will occupy approximately 60,000 square feet and consolidate three existing healthcare facilities. Construction is expected to begin in early 2027, with the health center scheduled to open in late 2028.
