= Cox Center =

Cox Center may refer to:

- Cox Business Convention Center, multi-purpose arena in Tulsa, Oklahoma
- Cox Convention Center, multi-purpose arena in Oklahoma City, Oklahoma
- Frederick K. Cox International Law Center, research center at Case Western Reserve University School of Law
- Cox International Center, research center at the University of Georgia
- Verne Cox Multipurpose Recreation Center, located in Pasadena, Texas

== See also ==
- Cox-McFerrin Center, an addition to the Reed Arena in College Station, Texas
- Cox Stadium, multi-purpose stadium in San Francisco, California
- Cox Arena, former name of Viejas Arena in San Diego, California
