= Winterville, North Carolina =

Town in North Carolina, United States

- Town / Suburb
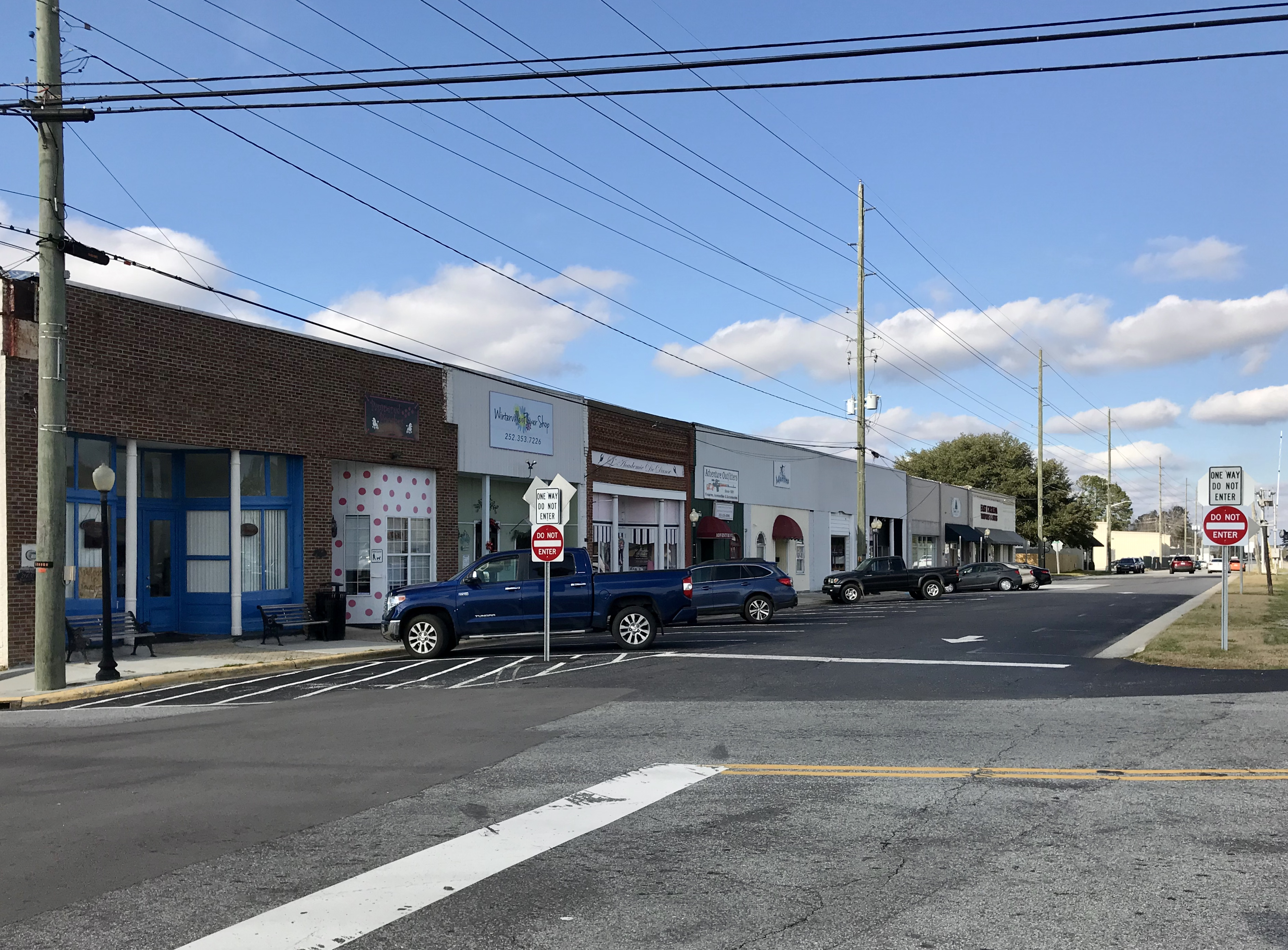
- Commercial buildings along Railroad Street
- Nicknames: Dub-V; WV; Pinebelt Boomtown
- Motto: "A slice of the good life!"
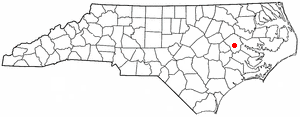
- Location of Winterville, North Carolina
- Coordinates: 35°31′45″N 77°24′00″W
- Country: United States
- State: North Carolina
- County: Pitt

Government
  - Mayor: Ricky Hines

Area
  - Total: 4.93 sq mi (12.78 km^{2})
  - Land: 4.93 sq mi (12.77 km^{2})
  - Water: 0 sq mi (0.00 km^{2})
- Elevation: 69 ft (21 m)

Population (2020)
  - Total: 10,462
  - Density: 2,121.2/sq mi (819.01/km^{2})
- Time zone: UTC−5 (Eastern (EST))
  - Summer (DST): UTC−4 (EDT)
- ZIP code: 28590
- Area code: 252
- FIPS code: 37-75060
- GNIS feature ID: 2406905
- Website: http://www.wintervillenc.com/

Winterville is a town in Pitt County, North Carolina, United States. The population was 10,462 as of the 2020 census. The town is a part of the Greenville Metropolitan Area.

== History ==
The town was founded on March 3, 1897 by Amos Graves Cox (AG Cox), an inventor, farmer, and businessman who initially moved to the area in 1880 and who began by refining and manufacturing a cotton planter invented by his father. While AG Cox initially planned to name the town after his family, due to the common nature of the name "Cox", he ultimately chose to use the name of a town where his cotton planters were sold -- Winterville, Georgia. The Town's public middle school, AG Cox Middle School, is named after him.

The Cox-Ange House and Renston Rural Historic District are listed on the National Register of Historic Places.

== Geography ==
According to the United States Census Bureau, the town has a total area of 4.6 square miles (12 km^{2}), all land.

== Demographics ==
Historical population
Census	Pop.	Note	%±
1900	243		—
1910	484		99.2%
1920	650		34.3%
1930	654		0.6%
1940	848		29.7%
1950	870		2.6%
1960	1,418		63.0%
1970	1,437		1.3%
1980	2,052		42.8%
1990	2,816		37.2%
2000	4,791		70.1%
2010	9,269		93.5%
2020	10,462		12.9%
U.S. Decennial Census

=== 2020 census ===
As of the 2020 census, Winterville had a population of 10,462. The median age was 38.7 years. 25.4% of residents were under the age of 18 and 13.7% of residents were 65 years of age or older. For every 100 females there were 90.6 males, and for every 100 females age 18 and over there were 85.9 males age 18 and over.

100.0% of residents lived in urban areas, while 0.0% lived in rural areas.

There were 3,940 households and 2,759 families residing in Winterville. Of the households, 39.7% had children under the age of 18 living in them. Of all households, 57.5% were married-couple households, 11.3% were households with a male householder and no spouse or partner present, and 26.7% were households with a female householder and no spouse or partner present. About 20.0% of all households were made up of individuals and 8.9% had someone living alone who was 65 years of age or older.

There were 4,166 housing units, of which 5.4% were vacant. The homeowner vacancy rate was 1.4% and the rental vacancy rate was 6.7%.

Racial composition as of the 2020 census
Race	Number	Percent
White	5,655	54.1%
Black or African American	3,794	36.3%
American Indian and Alaska Native	28	0.3%
Asian	166	1.6%
Native Hawaiian and Other Pacific Islander	6	0.1%
Some other race	218	2.1%
Two or more races	595	5.7%
Hispanic or Latino (of any race)	507	4.8%

=== 2010 census ===
As of 2010, there were 9269 people, 1,848 households, and 1,371 families living in the town. The population density was 1,954.1 inhabitants per square mile (754.5/km^{2}). There were 1,937 housing units at an average density of 790.0 per square mile (305.0/km^{2}). The racial makeup of the town was 59.24% White, 38.36% African American, 0.35% Native American, 0.81% Asian, 0.10% Pacific Islander, 0.40% from other races, and 0.73% from two or more races. Hispanic or Latino of any race were 1.02% of the population.

Of the 1,848 households 38.6% had children under the age of 18 living with them, 53.6% were married couples living together, 17.5% had a female householder with no husband present, and 25.8% were non-families. 22.6% of households were one person and 7.6% were one person aged 65 or older. The average household size was 2.57 and the average family size was 3.01.

The age distribution was 28.0% under the age of 18, 7.9% from 18 to 24, 34.3% from 25 to 44, 19.7% from 45 to 64, and 10.2% 65 or older. The median age was 33 years. For every 100 females, there were 84.3 males. For every 100 females age 18 and over, there were 79.6 males.

The median household income was $37,230 and the median family income was $47,167. Males had a median income of $36,004 versus $30,000 for females. The per capita income for the town was $19,810. About 10.3% of families and 11.6% of the population were below the poverty line, including 16.4% of those under age 18 and 12.4% of those age 65 or over.

== Education ==
- Pitt Community College
- W.H. Robinson Elementary School
- A.G. Cox Middle School
- South Central High School
- Brookhaven Christian School
- Christ Covenant School
- Creekside Elementary

== Parks and recreation ==
Winterville's Recreation Park is its largest park and has four baseball fields, an amphitheater for concerts and Movie in the Park events, and a mile-long trail around the park. It hosts the Watermelon Festival every summer. Hillcrest Park is the Town's second-largest park and is the home of the only traffic garden (a miniature painted streetscape to practice safe biking and walking) in Eastern North Carolina.

Winterville Baseball is part of The Cal Ripken League and has succeeded in All-Star tournaments over the last decade.

The Pitt County Girls Softball Little League, based in Winterville, won the 2024 Little League Softball World Series. The team were runner-ups in the 2023 World Series.

== Growth ==
In recent years, the town of Winterville has experienced major growth both residentially and commercially. Since the 1990s, subdivisions such as Winterville Crossing, Cedar Ridge, Irish Creek and many others surrounding the area have sprouted.

== Notable people ==
- Derek Cox (born 1986) – an American football cornerback for the New England Patriots
- Ivan Koloff – Wrestling champion
