= Cox Lake =

Cox Lake may refer to:

- Cox Lake (Nova Scotia)
- Cox Lake (British Columbia)

== See also ==
- Coxs Lake
