= Cox-Parks House =

Historic house in West Virginia, United States

- U.S. National Register of Historic Places
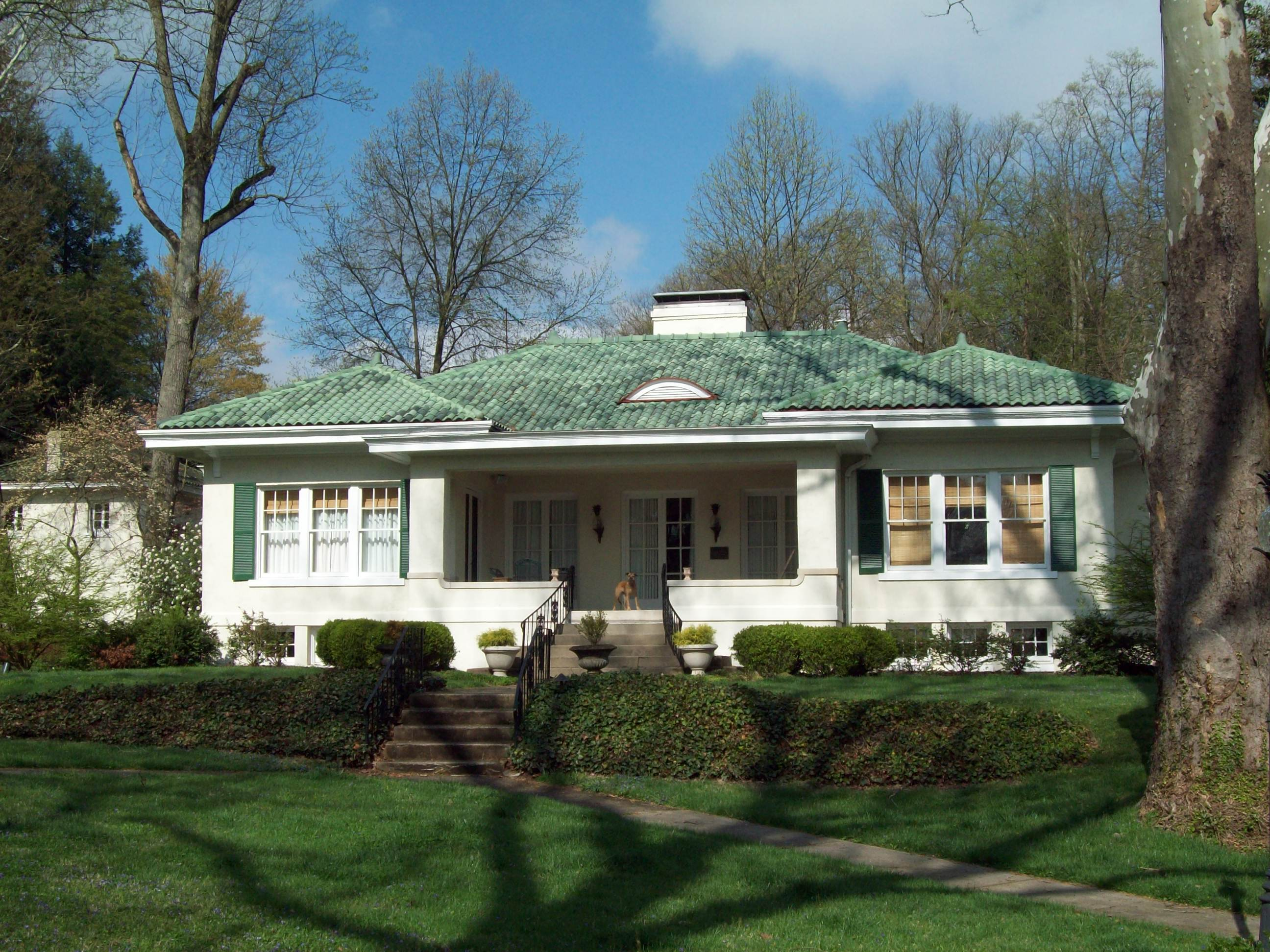
- Cox-Parks House, April 2009

- Location within West Virginia Location within the United States
- Location: 710 Myrtle Rd., Charleston, West Virginia
- Coordinates: 38°20′47″N 81°38′43″W
- Area: 0.5 acres (0.20 ha)
- Built: 1925
- Architectural style: Prairie School, Bungaloid
- MPS: South Hills MRA
- NRHP reference No.: 84000400
- Added to NRHP: October 26, 1984

Cox-Parks House is a historic home located at Charleston, West Virginia. Emma Cox, the wife of Frank Cox, leader of several coal companies in the Kanawha Valley, had this home built for herself in about 1925 when she gave the old "Home Hill" to her daughter's family. It is an elaborate bungalow in the Prairie School-style. The exterior features clean white stucco and green tile and a double entrance and flanking double windows, housed by a recessed porch.

It was listed on the National Register of Historic Places in 1984 as part of the South Hills Multiple Resource Area.
