= Pasadena, Texas =

- City
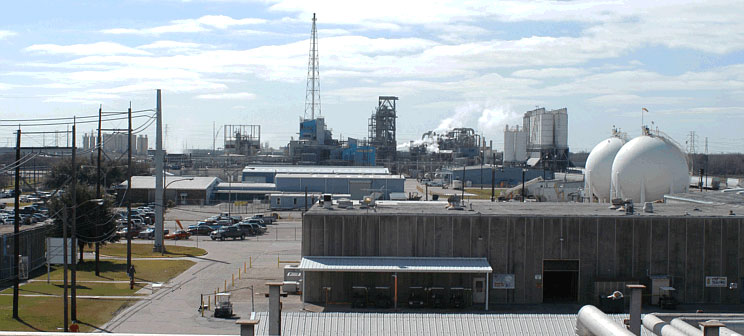
- Motto: "Enriched by our Heritage. Inspired by our Future."
- Location in Harris County and the state of Texas
- Coordinates: 29°40′34″N 95°10′26″W
- Country: United States
- State: Texas
- County: Harris
- Founded: 1893
- Incorporated: December 22, 1923 and December 26, 1928
- Named for: Pasadena, California

Government
  - Type: Mayor-Council
  - Mayor: Thomas Schoenbein
  - City Council: Carlos Heredia Sr. Bianca Valerio; Emmanuel Guerrero; Pat Van Houte; Jonathan Estrada; Dolan Dow; Johnny Fusilier Jr. Aaron E. Styron

Area
  - City: 44.74 sq mi (115.88 km^{2})
  - Land: 43.68 sq mi (113.14 km^{2})
  - Water: 1.06 sq mi (2.75 km^{2})
- Elevation: 30 ft (9.1 m)

Population (2020)
  - City: 151,950
  - Density: 3,462.0/sq mi (1,336.69/km^{2})
  - Metro: 5,628,101
- Time zone: UTC−6 (CST)
  - Summer (DST): UTC−5 (CDT)
- ZIP codes: 77501-77508, 77586 (El Jardin)
- Area codes: 713, 281, 346, 832, 621
- FIPS code: 48-56000
- GNIS feature ID: 1343631
- Website: www.pasadenatx.gov

Pasadena (/ˌpæsəˈdiːnə/ PASS-ə-DEE-nə) is a city in the U.S. state of Texas, located in Harris County. It is part of the Houston–Pasadena–The Woodlands metropolitan area. As of the 2020 U.S. census, the city's population was 151,950, making it the 23rd most populous city in Texas and the second most populous in Harris County, after Houston. The area was founded in 1893 by John H. Burnett of Galveston, who named the area after Pasadena, California, because of the perceived lush vegetation.

== History ==
=== Early history ===
Prior to European settlement the area around Galveston Bay was settled by the Karankawa and Atakapan tribes, particularly the Akokisa, who lived throughout the Gulf coast region. Spanish explorers such as the Rivas-Iriarte expedition and José Antonio de Evia charted the bay and gave it its name. The pirate Jean Lafitte established a short-lived kingdom based in Galveston in the early 19th century with bases and hide-outs around the bay and around Clear Lake. Lafitte was forced to leave in 1821 by the U.S. Navy.

Following its declaration of independence from Spain the new nation of Mexico moved to colonize its northern territory of Texas by offering land grants to settlers both from within Mexico and from the nearby United States. The colony established by Stephen F. Austin and the Galveston Bay and Texas Land Company of New York rapidly began a wave of settlement around the bay. Following a coup in the Mexican government by General Antonio Lopez de Santa Anna, Texas revolted against Mexican rule in 1835. After several battles and skirmishes the final battle of the Texas Revolution took place near modern Pasadena on April 21, 1836. While the main battlefield was located in the neighboring present-day city of La Porte, Santa Anna was captured in present-day Pasadena at Vince's Bayou. Because this was the last conflict that led to the Mexican surrender, Pasadena and neighboring Deer Park have adopted the nickname "Birthplace of Texas".

=== Ranching and settlement ===
Sam Allen started a ranch in 1843 with 350 acres (1.4 km^{2}). This became the Allen Ranch which occupied what is now western Pasadena all the way to Harrisburg, Texas. By 1888, the ranch contained 15,000 acres (61 km^{2}) in Harris County, 10,000 acres (40 km^{2}) in Brazoria County, Texas with grazing lands in Galveston and Fort Bend Counties.

The Galveston, Houston & Henderson Railroad ran through the Allen ranch. There was a problem of cattle being regularly killed on the tracks and in 1875, Allen built a 19-mile (31 km) fence along the east side of the railway right of way to keep the cattle off the tracks. The fence ran from Harrisburg to League City and had four rails and a top rail wide enough to walk on. A gate was placed in the fence at the Harrisburg-Lynchburg Road with a large sign above instructing that it should be closed at all times. The area east of this railroad fence running from Buffalo Bayou to the tracks on Sims Bayou ran all the way to Galveston Bay. It contained 100,000 acres (400 km^{2}) of grazing land for cattle.

"Proposed" towns in or near present-day Pasadena were set up but short lived and either abandoned or never even got off the ground. In 1892 Colonel John H. Burnett of Galveston established an unnamed townsite on the Vince Survey just east of the Allen Ranch. Burnett was involved in both construction and promotion of railroads and knew their impact on the value of property. The land was sold in 10 acres (4.0 ha) lots. He had also established the nearby towns of Deepwater and Genoa, later to be incorporated into Pasadena and Houston.

=== 20th century ===
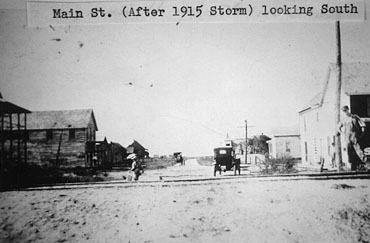
Downtown Pasadena after the 1915 Hurricane.

The 1900 hurricane that destroyed Galveston heavily damaged Pasadena, as well. The city received a population boost from some Galveston refugees who relocated to the mainland following the catastrophe. Donations by the newly created Red Cross, including millions of strawberry plants to Gulf Coast farmers, helped revive the community. This and the subsequent establishment of a major strawberry farm in the area by Texaco founder Joseph S. Cullinan made Pasadena a major fruit producer for many years afterward. As the community recovered major tracts of the Allen Ranch were liquidated opening up new development. Rice farmers from Japan settled in the community further diversifying its agriculture. Champion Coated Paper Company of Ohio opened a paper mill in 1937. Other businesses began to develop.

In 1901 the Texas Oil Boom began with the gusher at Spindletop. The discovery of the oil field at Goose Creek led to increasing petroleum exploration around Galveston Bay. By 1917–1920 refinery operations had appeared in Pasadena and continued to expand thereafter for example the Pasadena Refining System... The world wars gradually brought further industrial development, with Pasadena's growth rate surpassing even neighboring Houston.

Pasadena voted to incorporate in 1923, but residents decided to cancel the incorporation one year later. Pasadena incorporated in 1928. Because of the 1928 incorporation, Houston did not incorporate Pasadena's territory into its city limits, while Houston annexed surrounding areas that were unincorporated.

By the mid-20th century Pasadena's economy had become strongly tied to petroleum and other heavy industry. NASA's Johnson Space Center (JSC) was established near Pasadena in 1963 with the residential community of Clear Lake City, partially under Pasadena's jurisdiction, established nearby. These developments helped to diversify the town's economy significantly. Eventually, the city gained the unofficial moniker Stinkadena by locals due to the pollution from its large industrial base.

Former Pasadena City Council member and State Representative Ray Barnhart described the city at the time as "a lovely community but politically corrupt." Barnhart recalled that a half dozen Pasadena officials were indicted in the late 1950s and early 1960s for public corruption.

In 1965, Houston Post reporter Gene Goltz Received the Pulitzer Prize for his exposure of government corruption in Pasadena, Texas, which resulted in widespread reforms.

=== 21st century ===
In the 21st century, Pasadena emerged as a mostly working-class suburb of Houston.

=== Tornadoes ===
==== 2015 tornado ====
On October 31, 2015, an EF2 tornado struck a warehouse within Pasadena city limits. Half of the warehouse was completely leveled with its roof significantly damaged. The tornado moved northeast into La Porte city limits and damaged approximately 30 homes.

==== 2023 tornado ====
On January 24, 2023, an EF3 tornado struck northwestern Pasadena. Multiple neighborhoods and apartment complexes were severely damaged by the tornado. No major casualties occurred with this tornado. The tornado would go on to affect Deer Park, and Baytown, Texas.

== Geography ==
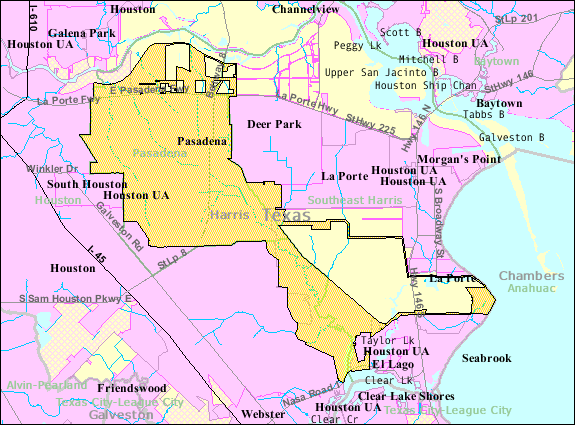
Map of Pasadena, Texas

According to the United States Census Bureau, the city has a total area of 44.5 square miles (115 km^{2}), of which 44.2 square miles (114 km^{2}) is land and 0.4 square miles (1.0 km^{2}) (0.81%) is water. The city is bordered by the Houston Ship Channel (Buffalo Bayou / San Jacinto River) to the north. The southeasternmost part of the city fronts Galveston Bay.

=== Climate ===
The climate in this area is characterized by hot, humid summers and generally mild to cool winters.

=== Neighborhoods ===
Neighborhoods in Pasadena include:

- Allendale
- Bayport
- Baywood Oaks
- Baywood Shadows
- Brookwood
- Burke Meadows
- Burkeshire
- Clear Lake City (Pasadena)
- Country Meadows
- Deepwater
- El Jardin del Mar - Annexed in 1970
- Golden Acres
- Old Downtown
- Parkland Village
- Parkview Estates
- Parkview Manor
- Parkview South
- Pasadena Gardens
- Pasadena River Oaks
- Red Bluff Terrace
- Turtle Creek
- Village Grove East
- Village Grove East Townhomes
- Village Grove
- Vista Villas

== Demographics ==
Historical population
Census	Pop.	Note	%±
1930	1,647		—
1940	3,436		108.6%
1950	22,483		554.3%
1960	58,737		161.3%
1970	89,957		53.2%
1980	112,560		25.1%
1990	119,363		6.0%
2000	141,674		18.7%
2010	149,043		5.2%
2020	151,950		2.0%
U.S. Decennial Census

As of the 2020 census, Pasadena had a population of 151,950. The median age was 33.5 years, with 26.9% of residents under the age of 18 and 11.7% of residents 65 years of age or older. For every 100 females there were 98.4 males, and for every 100 females age 18 and over there were 96.5 males age 18 and over.

=== Racial and ethnic composition ===
Pasadena city, Texas – Racial and ethnic composition Note: the US Census treats Hispanic/Latino as an ethnic category. This table excludes Latinos from the racial categories and assigns them to a separate category. Hispanics/Latinos may be of any race.
Race / Ethnicity (NH = Non-Hispanic)	Pop 2000	Pop 2010	Pop 2020	% 2000	% 2010	% 2020
White alone (NH)	66,923	48,734	37,341	47.24%	32.70%	24.57%
Black or African American alone (NH)	2,068	2,965	4,992	1.46%	1.99%	3.29%
Native American or Alaska Native alone (NH)	409	312	260	0.29%	0.21%	0.17%
Asian alone (NH)	2,531	3,074	3,346	1.79%	2.06%	2.20%
Native Hawaiian or Pacific Islander alone (NH)	31	68	59	0.02%	0.05%	0.04%
Other Race alone (NH)	99	168	466	0.07%	0.11%	0.31%
Mixed race or Multiracial (NH)	1,265	1,030	2,449	0.89%	0.69%	1.61%
Hispanic or Latino (any race)	68,348	92,692	103,037	48.24%	62.19%	67.81%
Total	141,674	149,043	151,950	100.00%	100.00%	100.00%

=== 2020 census ===
99.8% of residents lived in urban areas, while 0.2% lived in rural areas.

There were 51,284 households in Pasadena, of which 39.7% had children under the age of 18 living in them. Of all households, 46.3% were married-couple households, 20.3% were households with a male householder and no spouse or partner present, and 26.5% were households with a female householder and no spouse or partner present. About 22.7% of all households were made up of individuals and 7.7% had someone living alone who was 65 years of age or older.

There were 55,994 housing units, of which 8.4% were vacant. The homeowner vacancy rate was 1.1% and the rental vacancy rate was 10.3%.

=== 2010 census ===
As of the census of 2010, there were 149,043 people. There were 54,712 housing units.

According to the 2010 census, the racial and ethnic makeup of the city was 83.3% White, 2.7% African American, 1.5% American Indian and Alaska Native, 2.1% Asian, 11.6% from other races, and 1.9% from two or more races. Hispanic or Latino of any race were 66.2% of the population.

== Economy ==
The city's key economic sectors include exploration for petroleum and gas, petroleum refining, petrochemical processing, solar panel manufacturing, maritime shipping, aerospace, and healthcare. The city's economy is closely linked to the nearby Houston Ship Channel and the Bayport shipping terminal and industrial district, as well as the National Aeronautics and Space Administration (NASA)'s Lyndon B. Johnson Space Center in the bordering Clear Lake Area. The Pasadena Refining System, a partnership of Petrobras and Astra Holding USA, is headquartered in Pasadena.

Additionally, Harris County operates the Kyle Chapman/Pasadena Courthouse Annex. Harris Health System (formerly Harris County Hospital District) operates the Strawberry Health Center, and the Pediatric and Adolescent Health Center – Pasadena. The nearest public hospital is Ben Taub General Hospital in the Texas Medical Center, Houston. The Texas Department of Criminal Justice (TDCJ) operates the Houston V District Parole Office in Pasadena.

There are four post offices in the city limits. In July 2011 the USPS announced that one, John Foster Post Office, may close.

=== Top employers ===
According to the city's 2017 Comprehensive Annual Financial Report, the top employers in the city are:

#	Employer	# of Employees
1	Pasadena Independent School District	8,330
2	SGS Petroleum Service Corp.	2,500
3	The Boeing Company	2,000
4	Mundy Company	1,921
5	University of Houston-Clear Lake	1,548
6	Shell Chemical	1,500
7	San Jacinto College	1,367
7	Bayshore Medical Center	1,210
9	Lyondell Chemical Co.	1,150
10	City of Pasadena	1,056

== Government ==
The government of Pasadena operates under a mayor-council form of government with a mayor and eight council members who are responsible for enacting legislation, adopting budgets and setting policies.

=== Public safety ===
The city has its own police department, which employs approximately 282 Officers, with one Police Chief, three Assistant Chiefs and other supervisory positions. The Pasadena Volunteer Fire Department is the largest of all volunteer municipal fire departments in the United States.

== Culture ==
The city has several museums, including the Pasadena Historical Museum, the Bay Area Museum and Armand Bayou Nature Center. Pasadena also has a community theater, an annual rodeo, and the Pasadena Philharmonic. The city's newspaper is the Pasadena Citizen.

The Champion paper mill closed in 2005. Several country music songs have been recorded with "Pasa-get-down-dena" as the title including Kenefick on their album "Hard Road."

=== Gilley's and Urban Cowboy ===
John Travolta, Debra Winger and other actors came to the city to film the 1980 hit movie Urban Cowboy, which depicted life and young love in Pasadena. The film centered on the city's honky-tonk bar Gilley's, which was co-owned by country music star Mickey Gilley. In 1989, Gilley's suffered an arson fire that gutted the interior of the building, including the mechanical bull used in Urban Cowboy. The shell of the building stood until 2006, when it was demolished by the Pasadena Independent School District, its current owner. Only the old sound recording studio remains. Gilley resided in Pasadena until his death May 7, 2022. The old address of Gilley's is a used-car lot.

=== Strawberry Festival ===
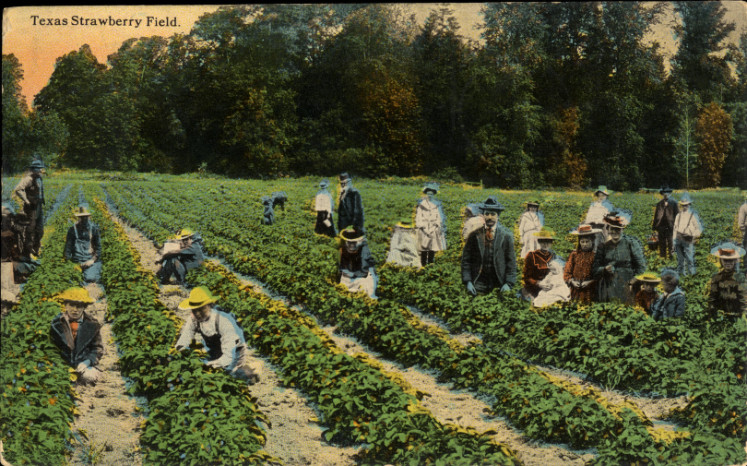
Texas Strawberry Field (postcard, c. 1908–1910)

In 1900, Clara Barton of the American Red Cross purchased 1.5 million strawberry plants and sent them to Pasadena to help victims of the 1900 Galveston hurricane get back on their feet. By the 1930s those crops had flourished so much that Pasadena was claiming the title of Strawberry Capital of the World. At its height, the city's strawberry growers shipped as many as 28 train carloads of strawberries each day. To honor that history, the city still holds an annual Pasadena Strawberry Festival. Strawberry Road stretches through much of the city near where the old strawberry crops grew. Attendance at the annual Strawberry Festival was 56,000 in 2008.

=== Pasadena Philharmonic Society and Orchestra ===
Pasadena Philharmonic Society and Orchestra is a combination of two groups. The Society is composed of members of the local community that support the fine arts and classical music. The Orchestra is composed of local music educators, musicians, college students and selected high school students. The Orchestra presented its first performance in the fall of 1982. The Philharmonic has presented performances ever since.

== Education ==
=== Primary and secondary schools ===
Most of city of Pasadena is served by the Pasadena Independent School District. Some of the eastern part is served by Deer Park Independent School District, some of the southern part is served by Clear Creek Independent School District and La Porte Independent School District.

The Roman Catholic Archdiocese of Galveston-Houston operated the St. Pius V School in Pasadena from 1947, until its 2020 closure; the COVID-19 pandemic contributed to the closure.

=== Colleges and universities ===
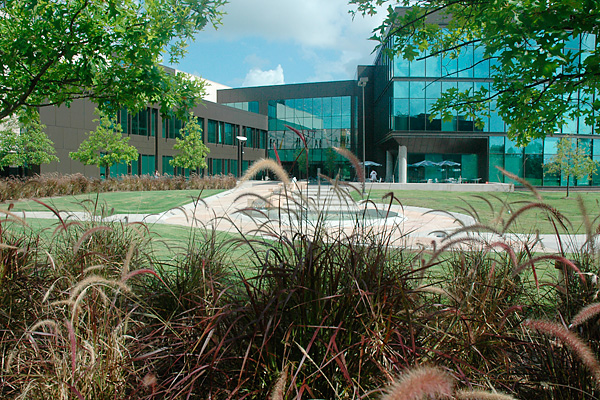
University of Houston–Clear Lake

Institutions of higher education include:

- University of Houston–Clear Lake (partially in the Pasadena city limits)
- San Jacinto College (Central Campus and System Headquarters) a community college system which under Texas law serves all of Pasadena ISD, La Porte ISD, and Deer Park ISD, as well as other school districts, and the portion of Clear Creek ISD in Harris County; this means in effect it serves all of the City of Pasadena.
- Texas Chiropractic College

=== Public libraries ===
Pasadena owns the Pasadena Public Library with the Main Library at 1201 Jeff Ginn Memorial Drive and the Fairmont Library, a branch, at 4330 Fairmont Parkway between Panama Street and Watters Road.

== Parks and recreation ==
The city operates 15 tennis courts, several baseball fields, and a total of 43 parks. These include over 14 miles (23 km) of trails, four Youth Recreation Centers, the Verne Cox Multipurpose Recreation Center, three pools for Swimming or Aquatics, an Athletics department, a Dog Park, Party Rentals, a Golf Course, an Historical Museum, and a Senior Citizen Center.

Harris County operates several community centers in Pasadena.

- East Harris County Activity Center
- Bay Area Community Center
- Clear Lake Water Front (Pasadena Section)

Local residents have access to tennis courts, soccer fields, jogging tracks, walking tracks, picnic tables, family gathering pavilions at Pasadena's 47 parks, 5 swimming pools, and 5 game room buildings, museum, recreation center, 15 tennis courts and 21 ball fields.

Armand Bayou Nature Center (ABNC) is a 2,500 acres (1,000 ha) preserve on the western shore of Galveston Bay in Pasadena. It is the only remnant of this region's original eco-systems: coastal tallgrass prairie, bottomland forest and bayou. A diversity of plant life has taken root here, including bottomland hardwoods. Hundreds of species of wildlife thrive in the narrow wooded streams and scattered lakes, ponds and marshes. Armand Bayou also is a breeding and nursery ground for many finfish and shellfish and a haven for rarely seen species such as bobcats and owls. As of 2010 ABNC has been designated as one of five preserves under the Texas Coastal Preserve Program of the Texas Parks and Wildlife Department.

== Infrastructure ==
=== Transportation ===
Pasadena is served by three freeway systems. Interstate 45 is the closest interstate to the Pasadena city limits. The main freeway artery is the Pasadena Freeway (State Highway 225). The east side of the Sam Houston Tollway (Beltway 8) runs through the eastern portion of the city.

The Harris County Toll Road Authority sells EZ Tags in the city.

==== Public transportation ====
Metropolitan Transit Authority of Harris County, Texas (METRO) operates a park & ride service from the Plaza Paseo Mall. This joint venture between Harris County, the city of Pasadena and METRO extended select trips. METRO operates four trips during the morning and five trips during the afternoon rush hours. Harris County Transit operates a bus route that runs through most of the city, stopping at health centers, shopping centers, colleges, and other venues, with connections to neighboring cites. The Pasadena Park and Ride lot is located on the north side of the mall.

==== County services ====
Harris County Youth Village, a juvenile detention facility, is located in far southern Pasadena, but it has a Seabrook postal address.

== Notable people ==
- Ray Barnhart, former member of the Texas House of Representatives from Pasadena, later director of the Federal Highway Administration
- Emily Chan, figure skater, 2016 junior national champion
- Dean Corll, serial killer, rapist, kidnapper and torturer, died in Pasadena
- Brandon Darby, political activist
- Donnie Elliott, former pitcher for the San Diego Padres
- Marlen Esparza, Olympic competitor 2012 and bronze medalist in women's boxing
- Jacob Green, All-American football player for Texas A&M and the Seattle Seahawks, born in Pasadena
- Russell Harvard, actor, There Will Be Blood, Fargo, born in Pasadena
- R. J. Helton, Christian music artist who placed fifth on the first season of American Idol
- Mike McKinney, former member of the Texas House of Representatives and 13th chancellor of the Texas A&M University System, from Pasadena
- Gilbert Pena, former member of Texas House of Representatives, from Pasadena
- Robert Talton, former member of Texas House of Representatives, born in Pasadena
- Duane Walker, former outfielder for the Cincinnati Reds

== Sister city ==
The city of Pasadena, community police outreach has devoted "friendship gardens" to the city of Hadano.

== See also ==
- Allen Ranch
- Galveston Bay Area
