= Muir site =

Archaeological site in Kentucky, US

- Approximate location within Kentucky today
- 37°53′2.65″N 84°35′34.8″W
- Cultures: Early Fort Ancient culture
- Location: Nicholasville, Kentucky, Jessamine County, Kentucky, USA
- Region: Jessamine County, Kentucky

History
- Built: 1010 CE
- Abandoned: 1255

The Muir site, (15JS86), is an Early Fort Ancient culture archaeological site located in Jessamine County, Kentucky, United States, in the Bluegrass region of the state. It was occupied from about 1010 to 1255 CE during the Osborne Phase of the local chronology. The site is near Jessamine Creek, on top of a broad ridge.

== Description ==
Unlike later Fort Ancient villages, which are more compact, the Muir site structures were spread out over the ridge top. These structures were rectangular with single set post construction, as opposed to Mississippian style wall trench construction. Within the houses were 30 centimetres (12 in) to 50 centimetres (20 in) deep floor basins with centrally located hearths for cooking and heating. Pottery found at the Muir site was limestone-tempered, unlike some later Fort Ancient pottery which became mussel shell tempered after contact with Mississippian cultures.

== See also ==
- Cox site
- Thompson site
