= El Jardin del Mar, Pasadena, Texas =

Coordinates: 29.600°N 94.991°W

El Jardin del Mar ("The Garden of the Sea" in Spanish, often translated as "The Garden by the Sea") is a community located in Pasadena, Texas, United States. Places within El Jardin have Seabrook, Texas postal addresses. Most of El Jardin's residents are those of the working class. As of 1998 it has about 400 houses.

El Jardin del Mar faces the Galveston Bay and is located north of Seabrook and southeast of Shoreacres.

In 1982 Joe McQuade of the Houston Chronicle described it as "a rustic and clannish village that wanted nothing so much as to be left alone with its fishing poles."

== History ==
It was started in 1923 by Edwin Kennedy. The neighborhood signs stated that the community was established the following year.

McQuade, while recalling an interview of an area resident, stated that in the 1920s the area had a "pastoral setting" while other bay area communities became centers of commercial activity.

The City of Pasadena had annexed El Jardin del Mar in 1970 as part of an effort to annex the Bayport Industrial District; Houston had opposed this, and the two municipalities had a legal conflict before coming to a settlement where Pasadena agreed to take the industrial district. A 1982 Houston Chronicle article quoted residents saying that they were unhappy about being annexed by Pasadena. McQuade stated that criticism was decreasing by then, and especially so with people who had recently moved to the area.

By 1982, additional tract housing had been built.

In 1998 there was a planned project for the Port of Houston that was to be built in proximity to El Jardin. Richard Connelly of the Houston Press stated that there was shock in the community because of the relative size of the project.

== Government and infrastructure ==
In 1982 the drive from El Jardin to Pasadena city hall was about 35 minutes. The community is physically closer to municipal halls of other nearby municipalities.

As of 1982 El Jardin used a separate fire department from the rest of Pasadena, as well as a separate water company. As of 2026 the Pasadena Fire Department now operates Fire Station 9.

As of 1982 the City of Seabrook provides sewer services to El Jardin.

Harris Health System (formerly Harris County Hospital District) designated Strawberry Health Center in Pasadena for ZIP code 77586. The nearest public hospital is Ben Taub General Hospital in the Texas Medical Center.

== Demographics ==
In 1982 there were about 1,200 people in El Jardin.

== Cityscape ==
In 1998 Connelly described the neighborhood as "affordable" and compared the character of El Jardin to those of pre-redeveloped neighborhoods in the 610 Loop. He described the architecture of houses as "more concerned with comfort than with cutting-edge architectural design."

As of 1982 there are no stores in El Jardin.

It is in proximity to chemical plants. In 1998 Connelly wrote "Chemical plants, and the occasional smell from them, are more prevalent here than one would think possible in a place residents are so enthusiastic about."

== Politics ==
In 1982, on average the community had around 60 voters. The pattern was that residents would vote against incumbent city council members.

In 1982 Richard Scott, a member of the Pasadena city council, stated that of the neighborhoods in Pasadena, El Jardin had the highest per capita amount of money given to it by the city government.

That year Johnny Isbell, the mayor of Pasadena, stated that the fact that bonds were used to make new infrastructure and other matters related to the law means that it would be difficult for the city to de-annex the area even though, according to him, some officials had, in McQuade's words, "sometimes toy with the idea of de-annexing El Jardin".

== Parks and recreation ==
In regards to tourism to El Jardin Beach, Houston Chronicle staff photographer Elizabeth Conley wrote in 2020 that "Most visit to escape the Texas heat without dealing with Galveston crowds." El Jardin Beach Park is a Pasadena municipal park. It is free for residents of the City of Pasadena while residents of other places are charged entry. The park was renovated in 2021 and 2022.

In 1982, the beach, parks, and recreation areas were not owned by the Pasadena municipal government and therefore not accessible by people not from El Jardin, including those from other parts of Pasadena; the recreational facilities are privately-owned or owned by the civic club. McQuade stated that this fact caused members of the Pasadena municipal government to "grouse".

As of 2005, there is the Bayfest celebration, held every year.

== Education ==
El Jardin is within the Clear Creek Independent School District. The community is within the Board of Trustees District 1, represented by Robert Allan Davee as of 2008.

Schools serving the community include: Bay Elementary School in Seabrook, Seabrook Intermediate School in Seabrook, and Clear Falls High School in League City. Residents were previously zoned to Clear Lake High School in Clear Lake City, Houston.

The portion of Clear Creek ISD in Harris County (and therefore El Jardin del Mar) is assigned to San Jacinto College.

== Literature ==
El Jardin del Mar Community Association has copies of Lucille B. Klopp's privately published 2002 book A History of El Jardin del Mar.
