= Cox's Road =

Cox's Road may refer to:

- Cox's Road, Hong Kong
- Cox's Road (New South Wales), Australia

== See also ==
- Cox (disambiguation)
