= The Conservative Caucus =

American public policy organization

- Logo of the Conservative Caucus
- Abbreviation: TCC
- Formation: 1974; 52 years ago
- Founder: Howard Phillips
- Type: Public policy organization and lobbying group
- Purpose: Emphasizing grassroots citizen activism
- Headquarters: Vienna, Virginia
- Location: United States
- Chairman: Peter J. Thomas
- Budget: $3.8 million
- Website: Official Website

The Conservative Caucus, or TCC, is an American public policy organization and lobbying group emphasizing grassroots citizen activism and headquartered in Vienna, Virginia, a suburb of Washington, D.C. It was founded in 1974 by Howard Phillips, who led it until 2012 when he retired due to his health. He was replaced by current chairman, Peter J. Thomas. Most of the organization's $3.8 million budget comes from the efforts of New Right fundraising gurus Richard Viguerie and Bruce Eberle. The organization produced a weekly conservative television program, Conservative Roundtable, which was hosted by Mr. Phillips until his retirement. Howard Phillips was also President of The Conservative Caucus Research, Analysis and Education Foundation (TCCF), a 501(c)3 tax-deductible organization.

== Issues of focus ==
TCC promotes an uncompromisingly conservative line on a wide range of issues. The following are a few it has emphasized:

=== Foreign/military ===
==== Immigration ====
TCC opposes illegal immigration and legislation characterized by TCC as an amnesty for illegal immigrants, such as S. 2611. The organization supports measures to secure the Mexican border, including a complete fence.

==== North American Union ====
TCC opposes the North American Union (NAU), which the TCC sees as the merging of the United States with Mexico and Canada. TCC also opposes the NAFTA Superhighway which it sees as facilitating smuggling, terrorist infiltration, and bypassing American port workers by using cheaper Mexican ports. TCC held a news conference on October 25, 2006, announcing formation of a coalition to oppose the NAU, which was featured by Lou Dobbs on CNN. The NAU is connected to the Security and Prosperity Partnership (SPP). TCC is a founder of the 'Coalition to Block the North American Union', and held a news conference in Ottawa, Ontario, Canada in August 2007 at the time of the SPP summit in Montebello, Quebec with the leaders of the United States, Mexico and Canada. Participating were representatives of many United States organizations as well as Connie Fogal, the Leader of the Canadian Action Party. The news conference was covered by Fox, CTV, Reuters, the Wall Street Journal and other U.S. and Canadian media outlets.

==== Trade ====
TCC is opposed in principle to what is called excessive or unlimited free trade, seeing such policies as being dangerous to the economic well-being of the American middle class, the manufacturing sector, and of the United States as a whole. TCC also specifically opposes various trade treaties, such as the World Trade Organization (WTO), North American Free Trade Agreement (NAFTA), General Agreement on Tariffs and Trade (GATT), and others as being threats to US sovereignty.

==== Cold War ====
Throughout the Cold War, TCC took a strong anti-communist stance, favoring active U.S. involvement around the world to undermine or overthrow pro-Soviet governments and bolster anti-Soviet allies. TCC often voiced concerns that the U.S. and its allies had fallen behind the Eastern bloc in the arms race to a position of military inferiority, not merely quantitatively but qualitatively as well.

==== China ====
TCC sees the People's Republic of China as a major military threat to U.S. security and interests. It suspects China of seeking to gain strategic control of the Panama Canal through a front company, Hutchison Whampoa. It also opposes Permanent Normal Trade relations with China and China's membership in the World Trade Organization.

==== Panama Canal ====
TCC opposed the Panama Canal Treaties which transferred control of the Panama Canal from the U.S. to Panama. To this day, it lobbies to return a limited American military presence to protect the Canal due to its strategic importance in trade and defense. TCC also fears that the Canal is vulnerable to terrorism.

==== United Nations ====
TCC supports a U.S. withdrawal from the UN, perceiving the organization as having ambitions to be a world government hostile to US interests and sovereignty, and which routinely votes against American interests.

=== Domestic ===
==== Constitutionalism ====
TCC supports strict constructionism and original intent when it comes to constitutional interpretation. In its view, the majority of federal agencies and activities are unconstitutional. Through its "Constitutional Education Program", TCC seeks to educate citizens on the Constitution and its importance in protecting the liberty of all Americans. TCC sponsors an annual 'Constitution Day' educational event on the anniversary of the signing of the U.S. Constitution (September 17, 1789), which in 2006 was televised on C-SPAN.

==== Health care ====
A major focus of TCC activism in 2009 and 2010 was opposing President Obama's health care reform bills and any greater government involvement in health care. Following passage, TCC is campaigning for the repeal of the enacted reform bill.

==== Washington, DC Congressional seat ====
TCC opposes efforts to create a full voting seat in the House of Representatives for the District of Columbia, based upon the Constitutional provisions that only states can have Congressional representation, and the Founding Fathers' intention to keep the nation's capital a neutral territory where all states may meet without fear of undue influence. TCC also opposed efforts to make the city into a state.

==== Taxes/IRS ====
TCC favors abolishing the income tax and replacing it with a low revenue tariff. This would eliminate the need for the Internal Revenue Service.

==== Social issues ====
TCC is strongly anti-abortion and opposes gay marriage. It favors school prayer and championed former Alabama Supreme Court Chief Justice Roy Moore for his stance favoring the display of the Ten Commandments.

== Conservative Roundtable ==
Conservative Roundtable was a nationally broadcast weekly conservative television program produced by The Conservative Caucus beginning in 1991. Each episode featured Howard Phillips conducting "in-depth interviews of key news makers, including authors, members of Congress, candidates for office, policy experts, inventors and academics".

By 2004, over 400 episodes had aired on television across the country. The show continued until 2012, when Howard Phillips stepped down from the Conservative Caucus for health reasons. The show's producer, Art Harman, commented that during the show's two decades in production it had reached "20 million households on 125 cable channels nationwide".
