= Cox Creek =

Cox Creek may refer to:

== United States ==
- Cox Creek Township, Clayton County, Iowa
- Cox Creek (Alabama), United States, a stream
- Cox Creek (Missouri), United States, a stream

== See also ==
- Coxs Creek, Kentucky, United States, an unincorporated community and a nearby creek
- Coxs Creek (Belfield, New South Wales), Australia, a watercourse
