= Renston Rural Historic District =

Historic district in North Carolina, United States

- U.S. National Register of Historic Places
- U.S. Historic district
- Location within North Carolina Location within the United States
- Location: Approximately 2.5 miles (4.0 km) along NC 903, roughly bounded by NC 1127 and Stokes Ln., near Winterville, North Carolina
- Coordinates: 35°31′33″N 77°28′43″W
- Area: 1,650 acres (670 ha)
- Architectural style: Greek Revival, Classical Revival
- NRHP reference No.: 03001236
- Added to NRHP: December 4, 2003

Renston Rural Historic District is a national historic district located near Winterville, Pitt County, North Carolina. The district encompasses 105 contributing buildings, 6 contributing sites, 7 contributing structures, and 1 contributing object on eight major farms in rural Pitt County near Winterville. It includes buildings largely dated from about 1890 to 1953 and notable examples of Greek Revival and Classical Revival style architecture. They include the Fletcher Farm, the Charles and Maggie McLawhorn farms, the Langston-Edwards properties, the Dail Farm, the Dennis McLawhorn farms, the McLawhorn-Abbott property, and the Richard Herman McLawhorn farms. Notable individual buildings include the Joseph Smith House, former Renston School and the first Bethany Free Will Baptist Church, Spier (Speir, Spire) Worthington House (c. 1840), Langston-Edwards House (c. 1840), the Dail House (c. 1850), and the Charles McLawhorn House (c. 1880, moved c. 1890).

It was listed on the National Register of Historic Places in 2003.
