= Cox Furniture Warehouse =

- U.S. National Register of Historic Places
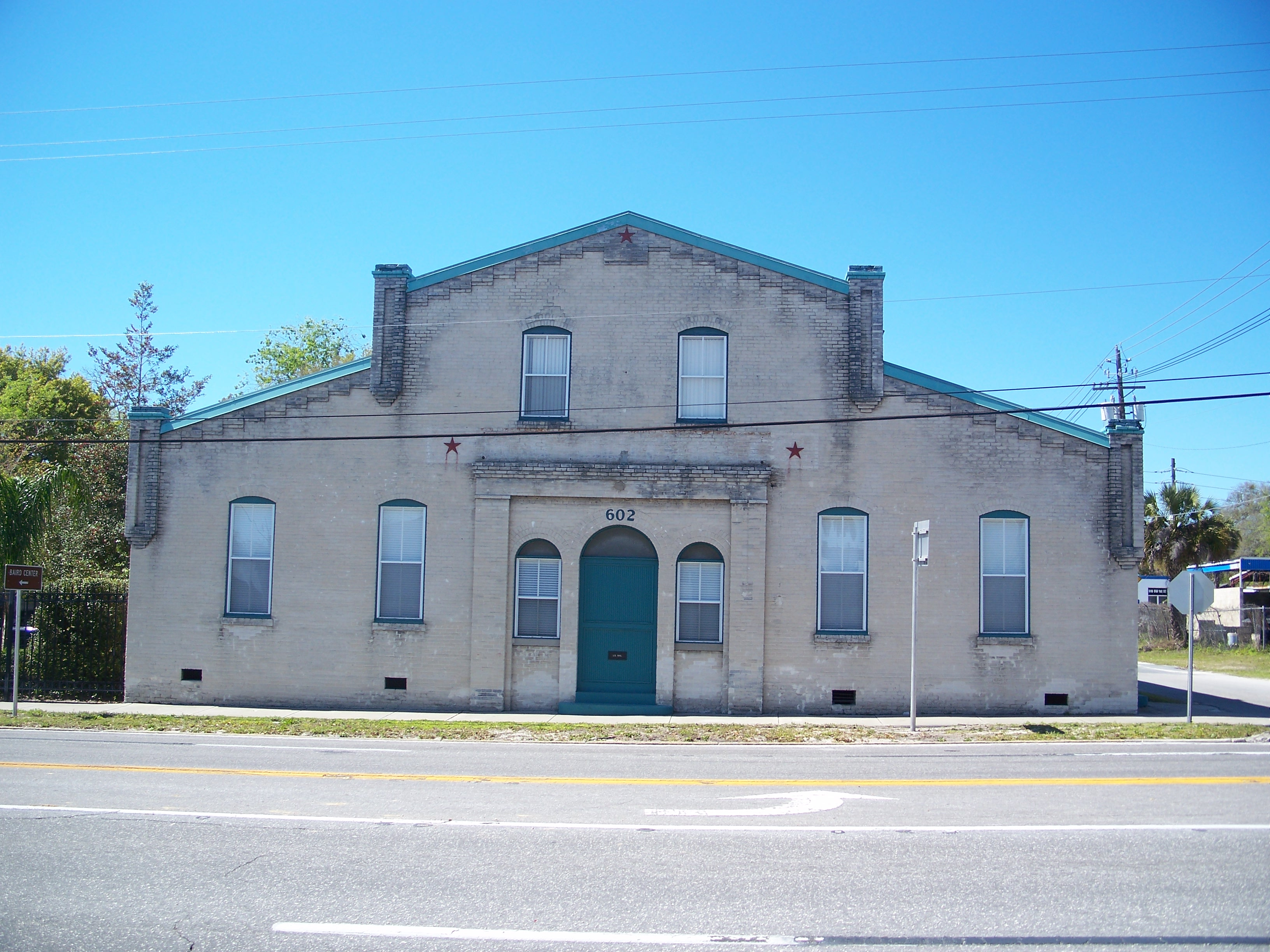

- Location within Florida Location within the United States
- Location: Gainesville, Florida, USA
- Coordinates: 29°38′44″N 82°19′32″W
- Built: 1914
- Architectural style: Romanesque
- NRHP reference No.: 94000580
- Added to NRHP: June 10, 1994

The Cox Furniture Warehouse is a historic site in Gainesville, Florida, United States located at 602 South Main Street. On June 10, 1994, it was added to the U.S. National Register of Historic Places.

== Gallery ==
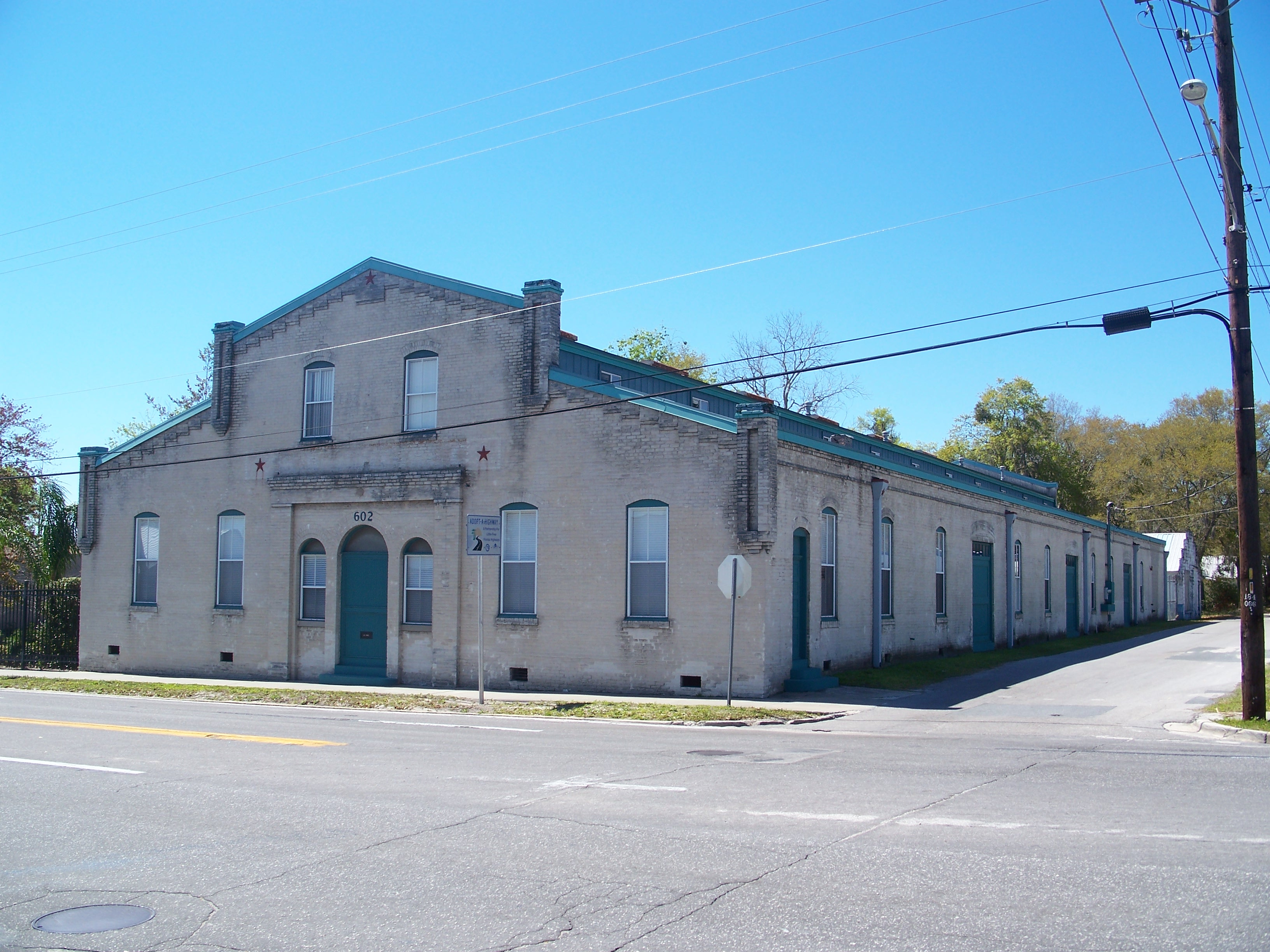
