= Mary Mills Coxe House =

Historic house in North Carolina, United States

- U.S. National Register of Historic Places
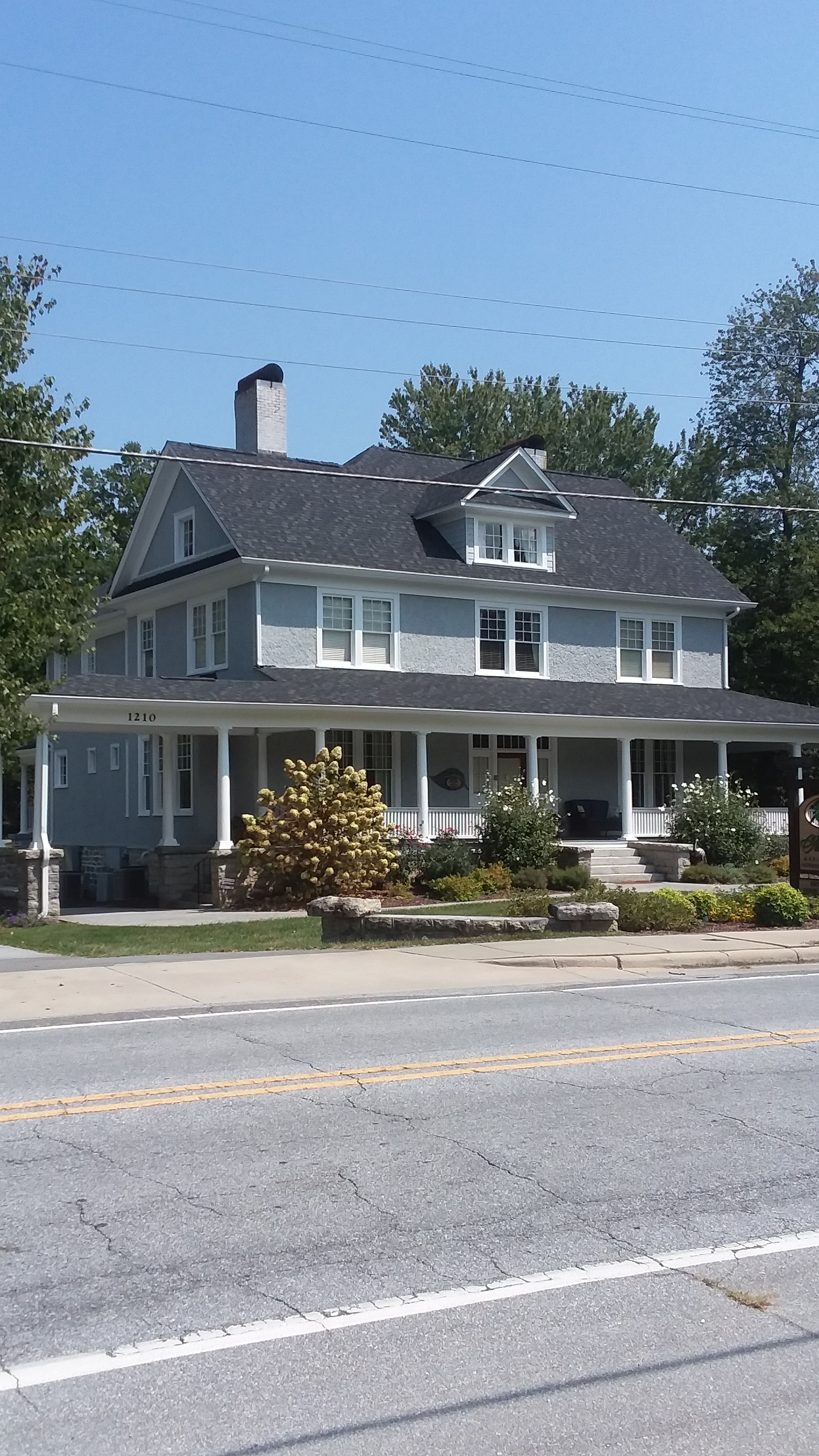

- Location within North Carolina Location within the United States
- Location: 1210 Greenville Hwy., near Hendersonville, North Carolina
- Coordinates: 35°17′50″N 82°27′5″W
- Area: 1.4 acres (0.57 ha)
- Built: 1911
- Architectural style: Colonial Revival
- NRHP reference No.: 94001052
- Added to NRHP: August 26, 1994

Mary Mills Coxe House is a historic home located near Hendersonville, Henderson County, North Carolina. Built about 1911, the house is a 2 1/2-story, Colonial Revival style frame dwelling with a pebbledash finish. It has a two-level side-gabled roof, a pedimented front dormer, and a rear gable ell. It features a one-story hip-roofed wraparound porch and porte-cochère. Also on the property is a non-contributing art studio building associated with the Flat Rock School of Art. In 1993 and 1994, the house was renovated for use as offices.

It was listed on the National Register of Historic Places in 1994.
