= Cox Creek (Missouri) =

Stream in the American state of Missouri

Coordinates: 36°30′44″N 91°31′30″W

Cox Creek is a stream in Oregon County in the Ozarks of southern Missouri. It is a tributary of the Warm Fork Spring River.

The stream headwaters are located at and the confluence with Warm Fork is at .

Cox Creek has the name of the local Cox family.

== See also ==
- List of rivers of Missouri
