= Richard Cox House =

Historic house in New York, United States

- U.S. National Register of Historic Places
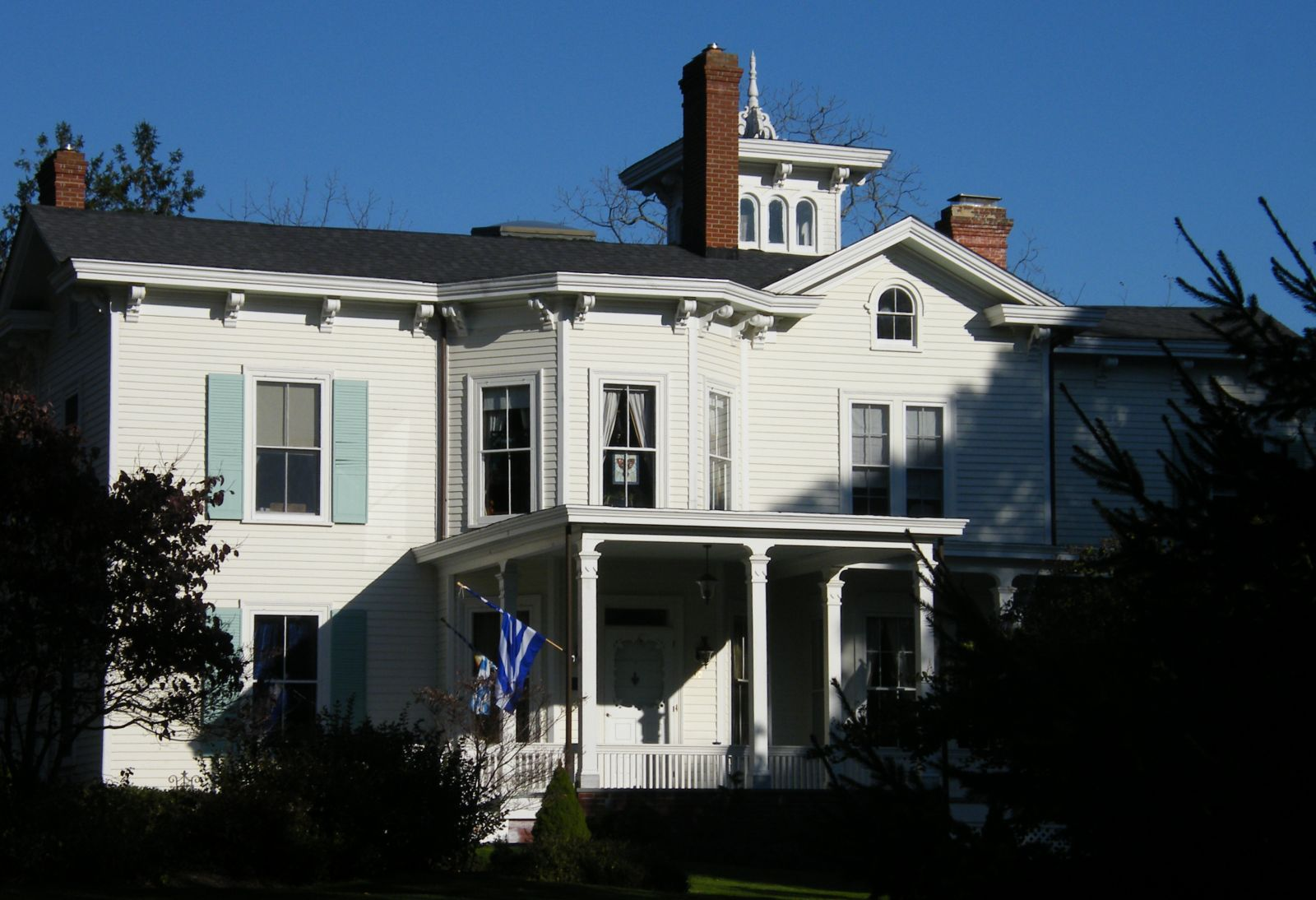
- Richard Cox House, October 2008

- Location within New York Location within the United States
- Location: Mill Rd., Mattituck, New York
- Coordinates: 40°59′55″N 72°33′28″W
- Area: 1.7 acres (0.69 ha)
- Built: 1829
- Architectural style: Greek Revival, Stick/Eastlake, Italianate
- NRHP reference No.: 86001721
- Added to NRHP: August 21, 1986

Richard Cox House is a historic home located at Mattituck in Suffolk County, New York. It was originally constructed in 1826 in the Greek Revival style and extensively remodeled in the 1870s in the Italianate style. The house features a cupola atop a low hipped roof. Also on the property is a 1 1/2-story, Stick-style former carriage barn.

It was added to the National Register of Historic Places in 1986.
