= Cox-Uithoven House =

Historic house in Mississippi, United States

- U.S. National Register of Historic Places
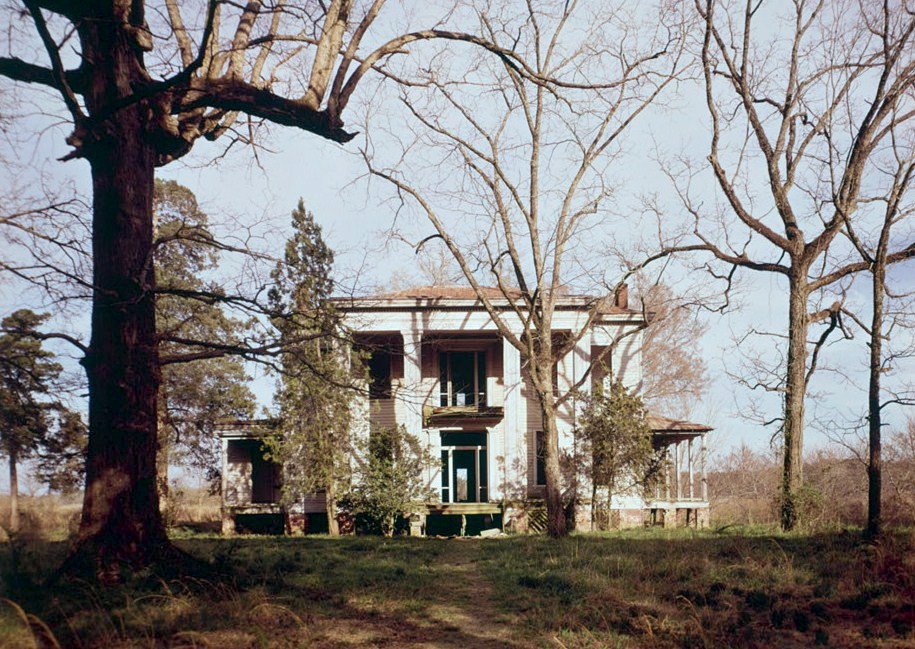
- Location: Old Aberdeen Road; Columbus, Mississippi
- Coordinates: 33.60101°N 88.45835°W
- Area: 10 acres (4.0 ha)
- Built: 1852
- Architect: James S. Lull
- Architectural style: Greek Revival architecture
- NRHP reference No.: 80002285
- Added to NRHP: May 8, 1980

The Cox-Uithoven House (also known as the Cedar Ridge Plantation, the Cox House, and the Dutch Village) is a historic house in Columbus, Lowndes County, Mississippi.

== Location ==
It is located on Old Aberdeen Road in Columbus, Mississippi.

== Overview ==
It has been listed on the National Register of Historic Places since May 8, 1980.
