= Golden Acres, Pasadena, Texas =

Area of Pasadena, Texas, United States

Golden Acres is an area in Pasadena, Texas, United States that was formerly an unincorporated community in Harris County.

Golden Acres is located southeast of Downtown Pasadena. The name comes from the developer's slogan, "a golden opportunity."

== History ==
A post office in Golden Acres opened in 1946. In 1949 the community had 400 residents and two businesses; at a later point Golden Acres had five businesses. Mail was delivered from Pasadena after the post office closed in 1959. In 1960, the population remained at 400. 1980s state highway maps show six churches, various residences, and a school in Golden Acres.

== Education ==
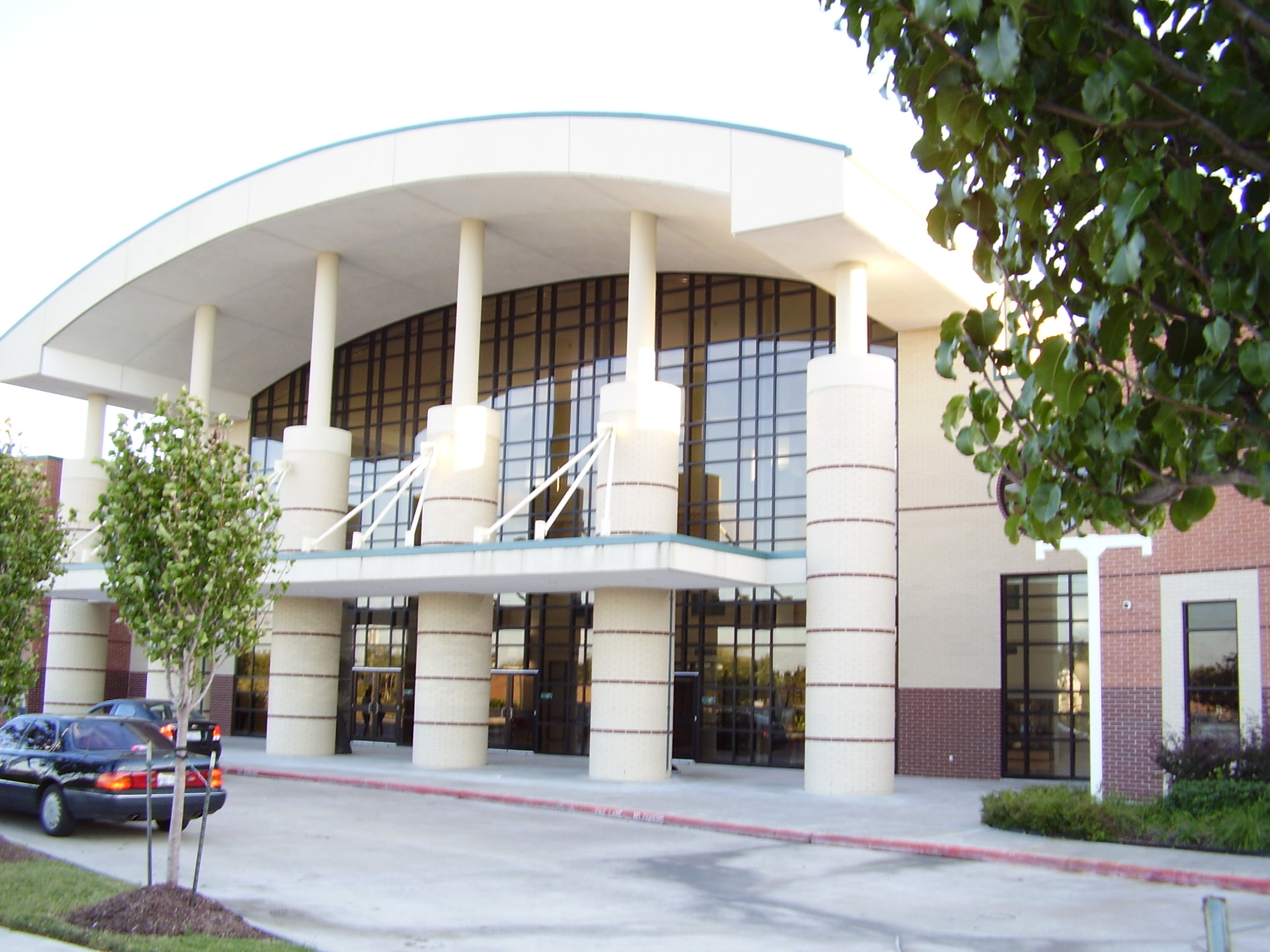
Pasadena Memorial High School

Golden Acres is in Pasadena Independent School District.

Zoned schools, all in Pasadena, include Golden Acres Elementary School, Lomax Middle School, Bondy Intermediate School, and Pasadena Memorial High School

Residents of Pasadena ISD (and therefore Golden Acres) are zoned to San Jacinto College.
