= Verne Cox Multipurpose Recreation Center =

Recreation center in Pasadena, Texas

- Type: Municipal Recreation Center
- Established: 1978
- Location: 5200 Burke Rd; Pasadena, TX 77504, Pasadena, Texas, United States; 29.63182°N 95.18187°W
- Nickname: Multipurpose Center or Verne Cox Center

The Verne Cox Multipurpose Recreation Center is a recreation center located in Pasadena, Texas. The center provides recreational programs, events, and services for Pasadena's youth and adults with cognitive or physical disabilities. The Verne Cox Center is a division of the Parks & Recreation Department of the City of Pasadena. The 15,000-square-foot (1,400 m^{2}) facility is fully accessible with a gymnasium, weight room, kitchen, two multipurpose activity rooms, bathrooms with showers and lockers, a swimming pool, and two wheelchair accessible softball fields. The facilities serve youths and adults with any type of physical, intellectual, or cognitive disabilities. An annual wheelchair tournament is held at the center for athletes in Pasadena, along with a number of other sports tournaments for disabled people.
