= Cox River =

Cox River may refer to:

- Cox River, Queensland, Australia
- Cox River, New Zealand

== See also ==
- Coxs River, New South Wales, Australia
