= Cox Island =

Island in Qikiqtaaluk Region, Nunavut, Canada

- Location within Nunavut Location within Canada

Geography
- Location: Hudson Bay
- Coordinates: 58°39′20″N 78°40′30″W
- Archipelago: Arctic Archipelago

Administration
- Canada
- Territory: Nunavut
- Region: Qikiqtaaluk

Demographics
- Population: Uninhabited

Cox Island is a northern Canadian island in eastern Hudson Bay and forms part of the Qikiqtaaluk Region. While situated 2 km (1.2 mi) off the western coast of Quebec's Ungava Peninsula, it, like other islands in Hudson Bay and James Bay, are in Nunavut.
