= Hewson Cox House =

Historic house in Pennsylvania, United States

- U.S. National Register of Historic Places
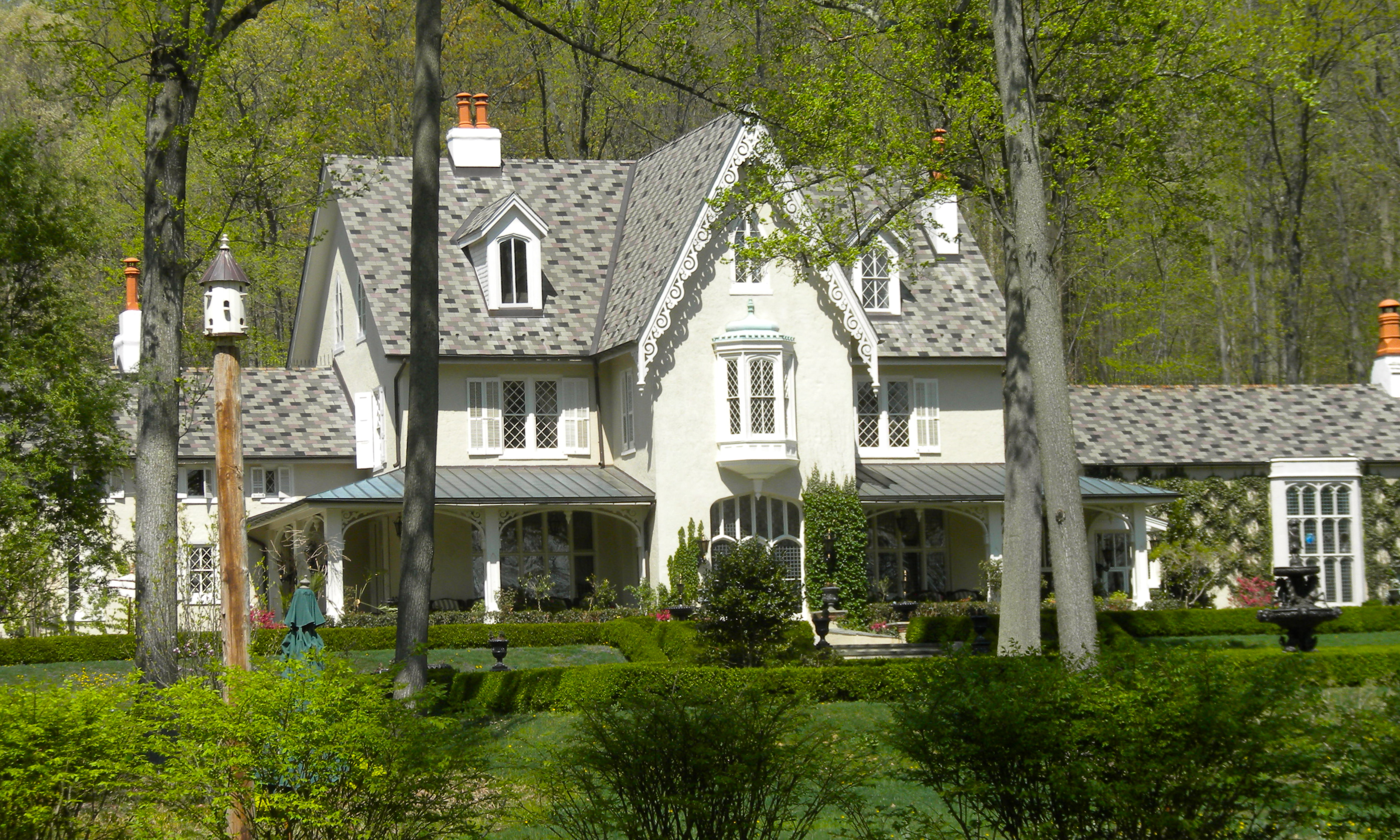
- Hewson Cox House, April 2010

- Location within Pennsylvania Location within the United States
- Location: Church Farm Rd., West Whiteland Township, Pennsylvania
- Coordinates: 40°2′51″N 75°36′24″W
- Area: 7.3 acres (3.0 ha)
- Built: 1854, 1904
- Architectural style: Rural Gothic-Cottage
- MPS: West Whiteland Township MRA
- NRHP reference No.: 84003188
- Added to NRHP: August 2, 1984

The Hewson Cox House is an historic home that is located in West Whiteland Township, Chester County, Pennsylvania, United States.

It was listed on the National Register of Historic Places in 1984.

== History and architectural features ==
This historic house was built in 1854, and is a two-story, three-bay, cross-shaped, stuccoed, stone dwelling that was designed in the Rural Gothic-Cottage style. It has a steeply pitched four-gable roof and features a central projecting bay with Tudor-arched openings. It also has a 1 1/2-story rear kitchen ell, and was renovated in 1904.
