= Cox-Hord House =

Historic house in Kentucky, United States

- U.S. National Register of Historic Places
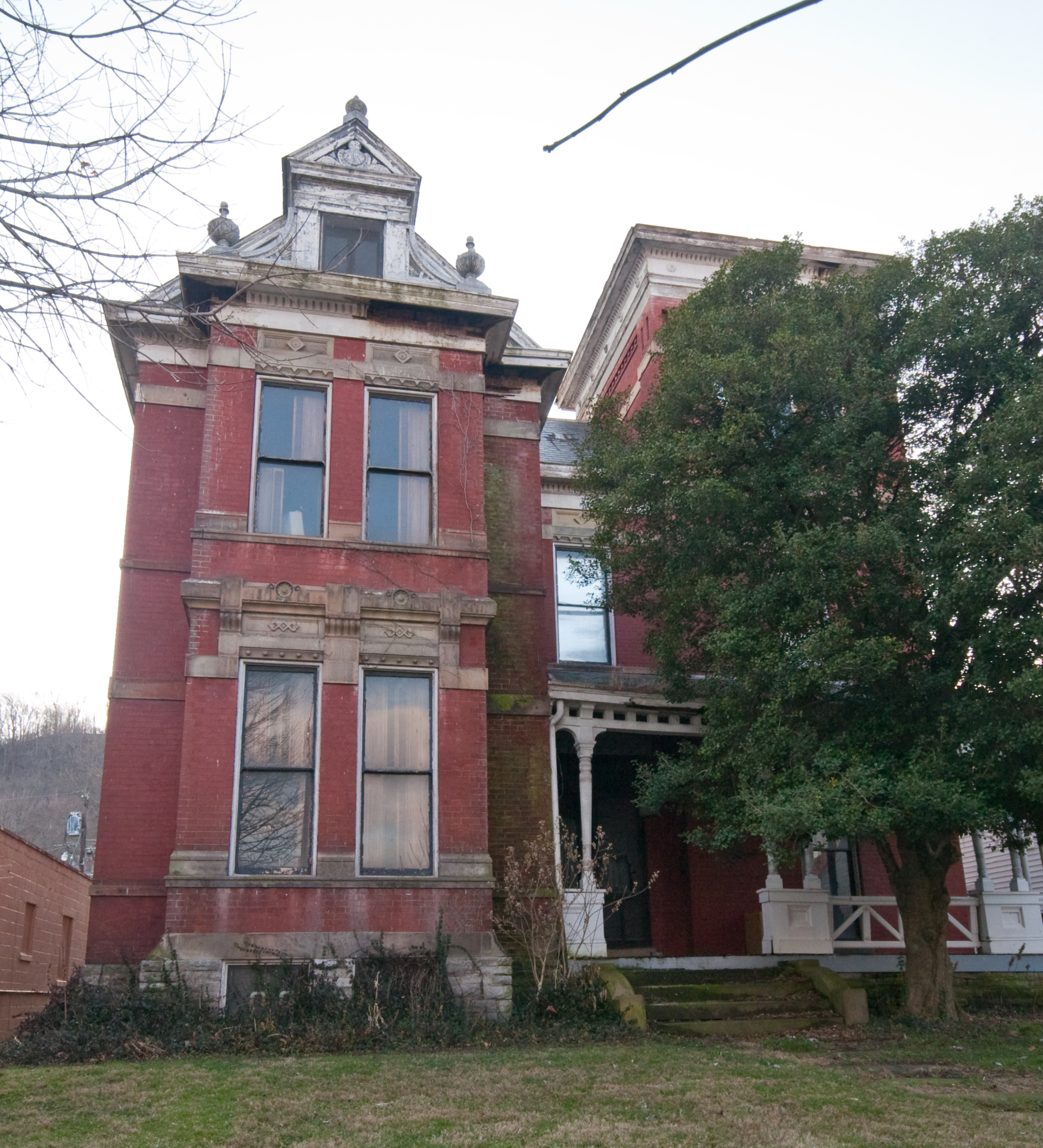

- Location within Kentucky Location within the United States
- Location: 128 E. 3rd St.
- Nearest city: Maysville, Ky
- Coordinates: 38°38′42″N 83°45′44″W
- Built: 1880
- Architect: Edwin Anderson
- Architectural style: Mixed (More Than 2 Styles From Different Periods)
- NRHP reference No.: 78001382
- Added to NRHP: July 14, 1978

The Cox-Hord House is a three-story brick structure in Maysville, Kentucky designed by Cincinnati architect, Edwin Anderson, and built in 1880 at a cost of $49,000. The architectural style is eclectic with elements of Victorian Gothic, Italianate and Victorian Romanesque. It is considered an excellent example of the "Mauve Decade" (1880–1890) due to the "use of the finest materials and superb workmanship". Ceiling heights are 14' for the first floor, 12' for the second and 10' on the third. A variety of wood was used for interior trim including light and dark walnut, cherry, fruit wood and ebony.

The house was built in 1880 for Andrew Cox and his wife, Mary Thomas Cox, daughter of a local distiller. In 1897, it was sold to wholesaler Milton Russell, and sold again in 1926 to Ferdinand Hechinger for his daughter, Rebekah H. Hord,

Rebekah Hord was active in Maysville civic affairs and is noted as the first elected female mayor in Kentucky, serving from 1951 to 1962. Hord's daughter and grandson were also elected Mayor of Maysville in 1986 and 1999 respectively.
