= Cox Lake (British Columbia) =

- Location within Vancouver Island
- Location: Vancouver Island, British Columbia
- Coordinates: 49°12′24.9″N 124°45′49.4″W
- Lake type: Natural lake
- Basin countries: Canada

Cox Lake is a lake located southeast of Port Alberni, British Columbia. It is named after the Cox family, who lived at Cape Beale lighthouse in the 1870s.

== See also ==
- List of lakes of British Columbia
