= Cox Town =

Cox Town may refer to:

- Cox Town, West Virginia, an unincorporated community in the United States
- Cox Town, Bangalore, suburb of Bangalore Cantonment, India
