= Andrew M. Cox Ranch Site =

- U.S. National Register of Historic Places
- Location within Texas Location within the United States
- Location: Austin, Texas, USA
- Coordinates: 30°14′35.16″N 97°48′20.52″W
- Area: 90 acres (36 ha)
- Built: 1873
- Architect: Andrew Cox
- Architectural style: Stone Corrals
- NRHP reference No.: 75002009
- Added to NRHP: December 6, 1975

The Andrew M. Cox Ranch Site is a historic collection of ruined buildings and structures in Austin, Texas, United States. The site is located on either side of Barton Creek near the intersection of Loop 360 and the Mopac Expressway. It included a small collection of wall enclosures (no habitable buildings remain onsite) and wagon tracks in the native limestone.

The site was added to the National Register of Historic Places in 1975.
