= Cox-Shoemaker-Parry House =

- U.S. National Register of Historic Places
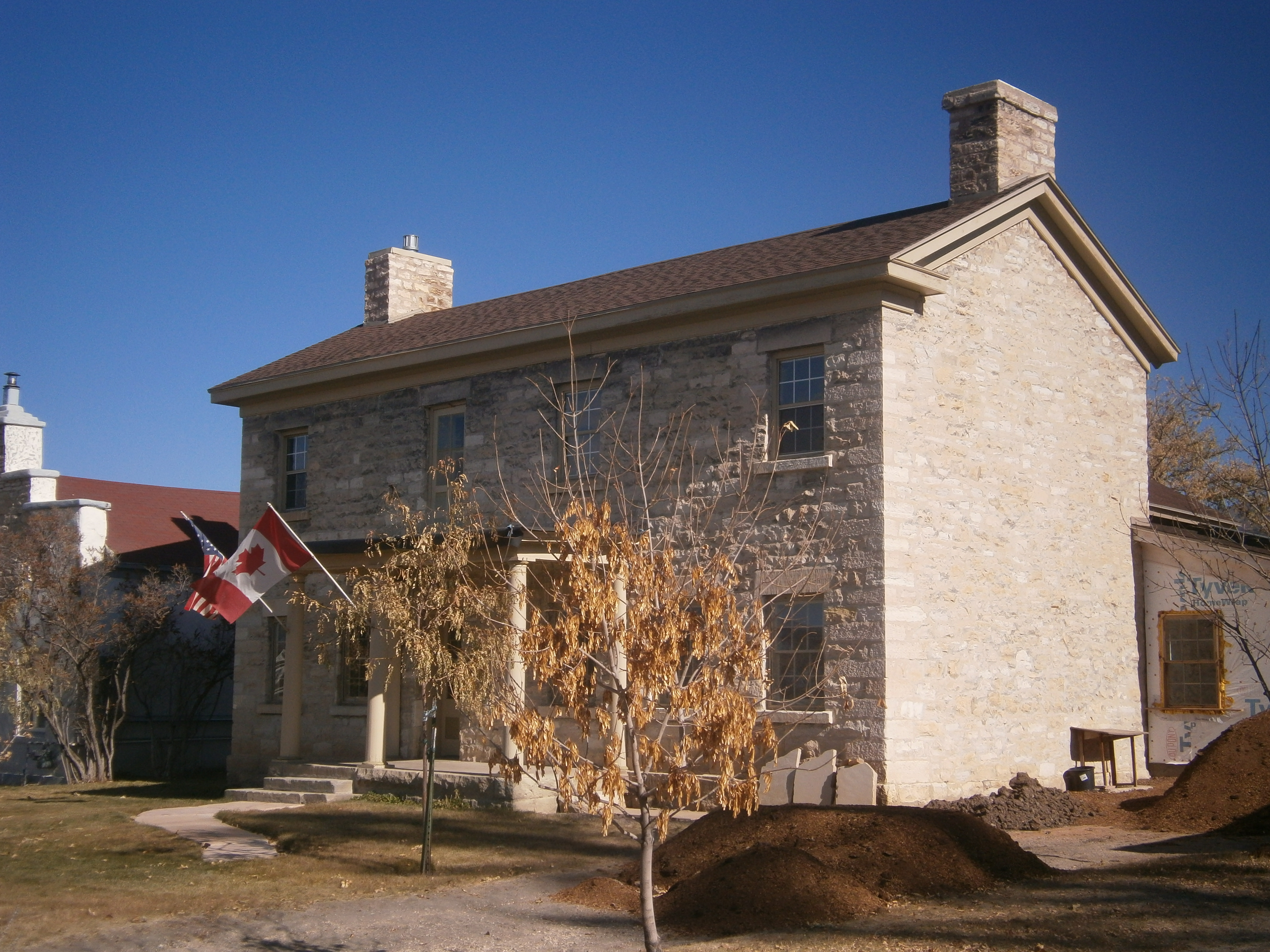

- Location within Utah Location within the United States
- Location: 50 North 100 West, Manti, Utah
- Coordinates: 39.266373°N 111.638700°W
- Area: 0.3 acres (0.12 ha)
- Built: 1858; 1880
- Built by: Oliver Sutherland Cox; Edward L. Parry
- Architectural style: Greek Revival
- NRHP reference No.: 82004157
- Added to NRHP: August 4, 1982

The Cox-Shoemaker-Parry House is a historic two-story house in Manti, Utah. It was built in 1858 by Orville Sutherland Cox, who converted to the Church of Jesus Christ of Latter-day Saints in Illinois, where he was baptized by Joseph Smith in 1839. Cox later served as the bishop of Bountiful, Utah, and he settled in Sanpete County in 1849. He became a counselor to Bishop John Lowery, Sr., in Manti, and he lived in this house with his three wives: Elvira Mills, Mary Allen, and Eliza J. Losee.

The house, designed by Cox, is constructed of coursed ashlar cream-colored limestone. It has a plain entablature, and, on the west front of the house it has pedimented returns, which are suggestive of Greek Revival Style.

The house was later purchased by Jezreel Shoemaker, a convert to the LDS Church who served as the mayor of Manti. It was later acquired by Edward L. Parry, a stonemason and immigrant from Wales who converted to the LDS Church and helped build the Salt Lake Temple, the St. George Tabernacle, and the Manti Utah Temple. Parry remodeled and expanded the house around 1880. The house has been listed on the National Register of Historic Places since August 4, 1982.

The house displayed a Maple Leaf flag along with a U.S. one, in September 2012.
