= Cox-Ange House =

Historic house in North Carolina, United States

- U.S. National Register of Historic Places
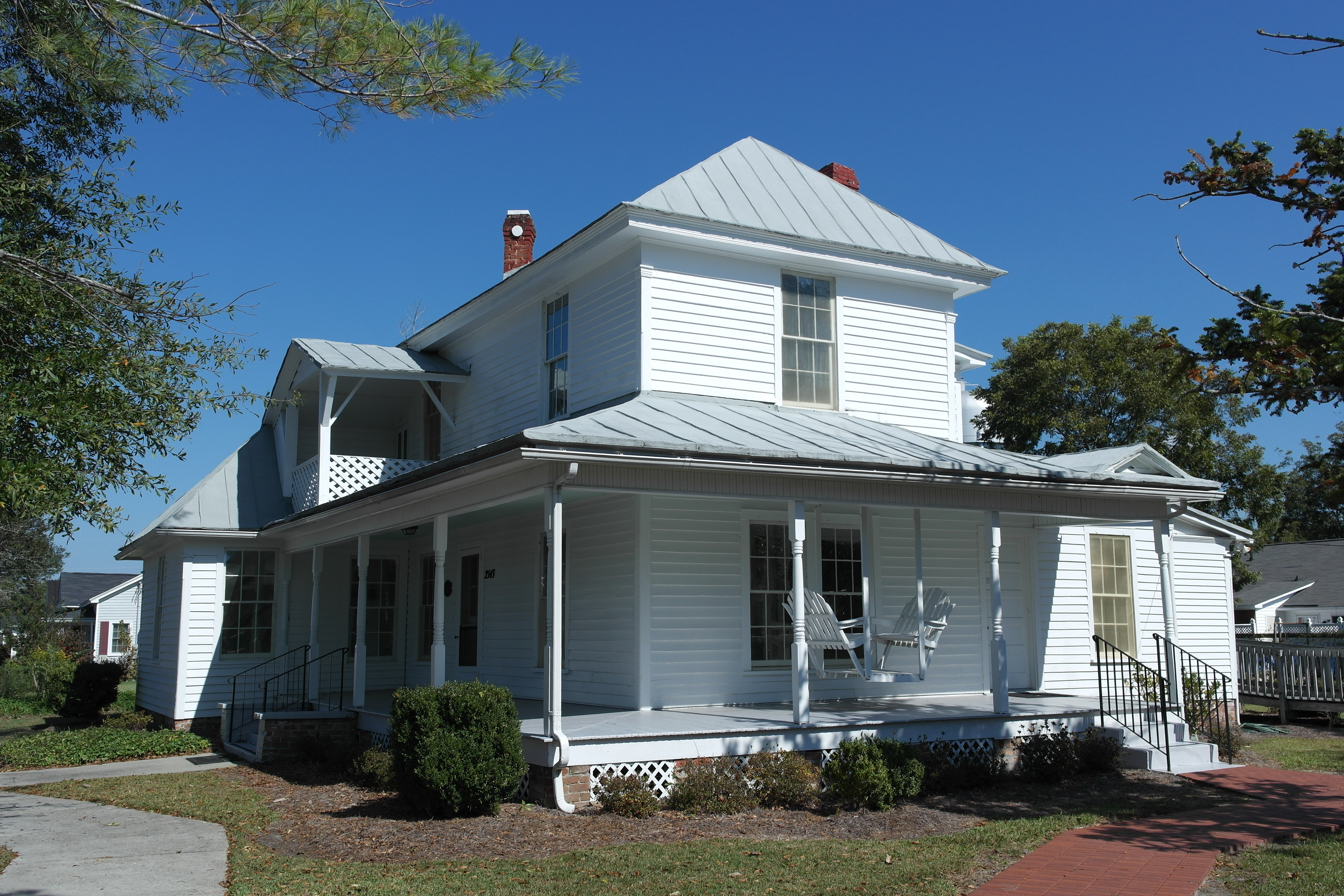
- Cox-Ange House, October 2014

- Location within North Carolina Location within the United States
- Location: 113 N. Church St., Winterville, North Carolina
- Coordinates: 35°31′43″N 77°24′4″W
- Area: 0.7 acres (0.28 ha)
- Built: c. 1900-1904
- Architectural style: Queen Anne
- NRHP reference No.: 00001181
- Added to NRHP: October 6, 2000

Cox-Ange House is a historic home located at Winterville, Pitt County, North Carolina. It was built about 1900 to 1904, and is a two-story, L-shaped, vernacular Queen Anne style frame dwelling with a one-story wing. An addition was built about 1910. It features a one-story, wraparound porch with a small sleeping porch on the second story. Also on the property are the contributing barn (c. 1900–1904), garage (c. 1930), wash house (c. 1930), and landscaped yard.

It was listed on the National Register of Historic Places in 2000.
