= Cox Furniture Store =

Historic site in Gainesville, Florida, United States

- U.S. National Register of Historic Places
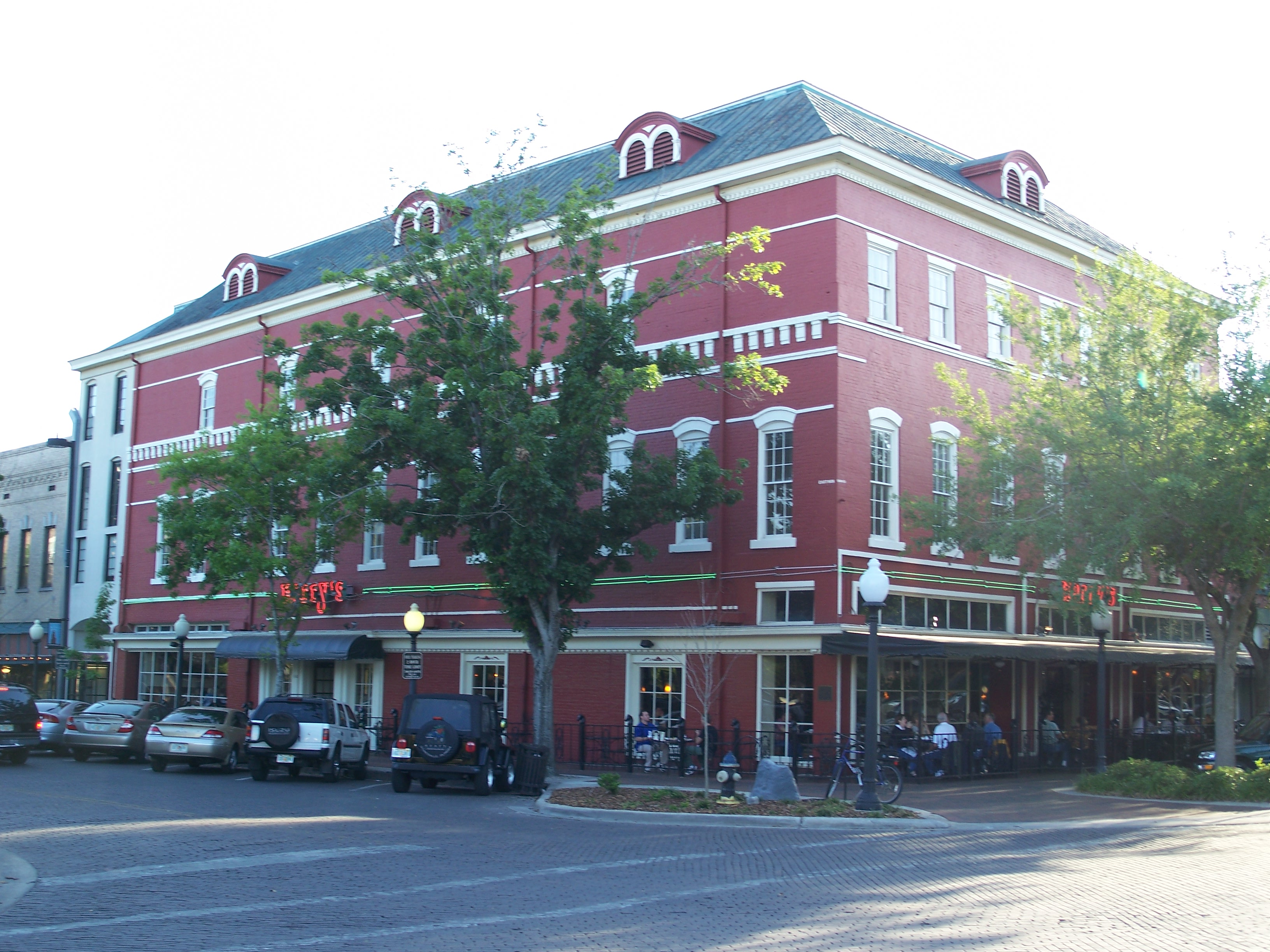

- Location within Florida Location within the United States
- Location: Gainesville, Florida
- Coordinates: 29°39′3″N 82°19′28″W
- NRHP reference No.: 94000579
- Added to NRHP: June 10, 1994

The Cox Furniture Store (also known as the Simonson Opera House or Edwards Opera House or New Baird Theater) c. 1890 is a historic site in Gainesville, Florida, United States. Built in the form and style of a small Romanesque Revival church, it is located at 19 Southeast First Avenue.

In 1938, the building became home to Cox Furniture Co, the largest furniture store in Gainesville. The company continued to expand into north-central Florida over the following decades. However, due to increased competition, Cox went out of business in 1991.

On June 10, 1994, the building was added to the U.S. National Register of Historic Places.
