= Cox Bluff (Tasmania) =

Mountain in Australia

- Bluff
- Location within Tasmania
- Coordinates: 43.526°S 146.200°E
- Location: South West, Tasmania, Australia

UNESCO World Heritage Site
- Official name: Tasmanian Wilderness
- Location: Oceania
- Criteria: iii, iv, vi, vii, viii, ix, x
- Reference: 181
- Inscription: 1982 (6th Session)

Cox Bluff is the ocean end of the New Harbour Range, on the south coast of Tasmania. It is situated on the west side of Cox Bight, and east of New Harbour, located at the south-west corner of Tasmania, Australia.

The Bluff is located on the south coast of the Southwest National Park, part of the Tasmanian Wilderness World Heritage Area, approximately 140 kilometres (87 mi) southwest of Hobart in Tasmania, and about 65 kilometres (40 mi) west and a little north of the South East Cape.

The cape is bound to the south by the Southern Ocean and is located east of South West Cape. It is listed in climbing websites as being 322 metres (1,056 ft) high.

Peter Dombrovskis had utilised a climb of the range to get photographs of the Cox Bight beach in 1987.

== See also ==
- South Coast Track
