= Cox site =

Archaeological site in Kentucky, US

- Approximate location within Kentucky today
- 37°56′51.79″N 84°44′21.37″W
- Cultures: Fort Ancient culture
- Location: Woodford County, Kentucky, USA
- Region: Woodford County, Kentucky

History
- Built: 1200 CE
- Abandoned: 1400

The Cox site (15WD107) is a Middle Fort Ancient culture (1200 to 1400 CE) archaeological site located in Woodford County, Kentucky, in the Bluegrass region of the state. The site is located on a large ridge and is approximately 65 metres (213 ft) by 60 metres (200 ft), although there may be other unexplored sections to the north.

Not enough investigations at the site have happened for archaeologists to be able to determine the pattern, shape or layout of the proposed village site. The finding of shell tempered pottery and distinctive triangular-shaped arrowheads along with radiocarbon dates has allowed researchers to date the site. Mounds burials at the site have been examined in a bioarcheological context in order to contextualize health and social status.

== See also ==
- Muir site
- Thompson site
