= Cox Green =

Cox Green may refer to:

- Cox Green, Berkshire, civil parish in the Windsor and Maidenhead district
  - Cox Green School, school in Maidenhead
- Cox Green, Greater Manchester, village near Bolton
- Cox Green, Surrey, the northern part of Rudgwick in West Sussex, some of which is in Surrey
- Cox Green, Tyne and Wear, village in the City of Sunderland, Tyne and Wear
  - Cox Green Footbridge, footbridge across the River Wear at Cox Green, Sunderland
