= Cox-Morton House =

Historic house in West Virginia, United States

- U.S. National Register of Historic Places
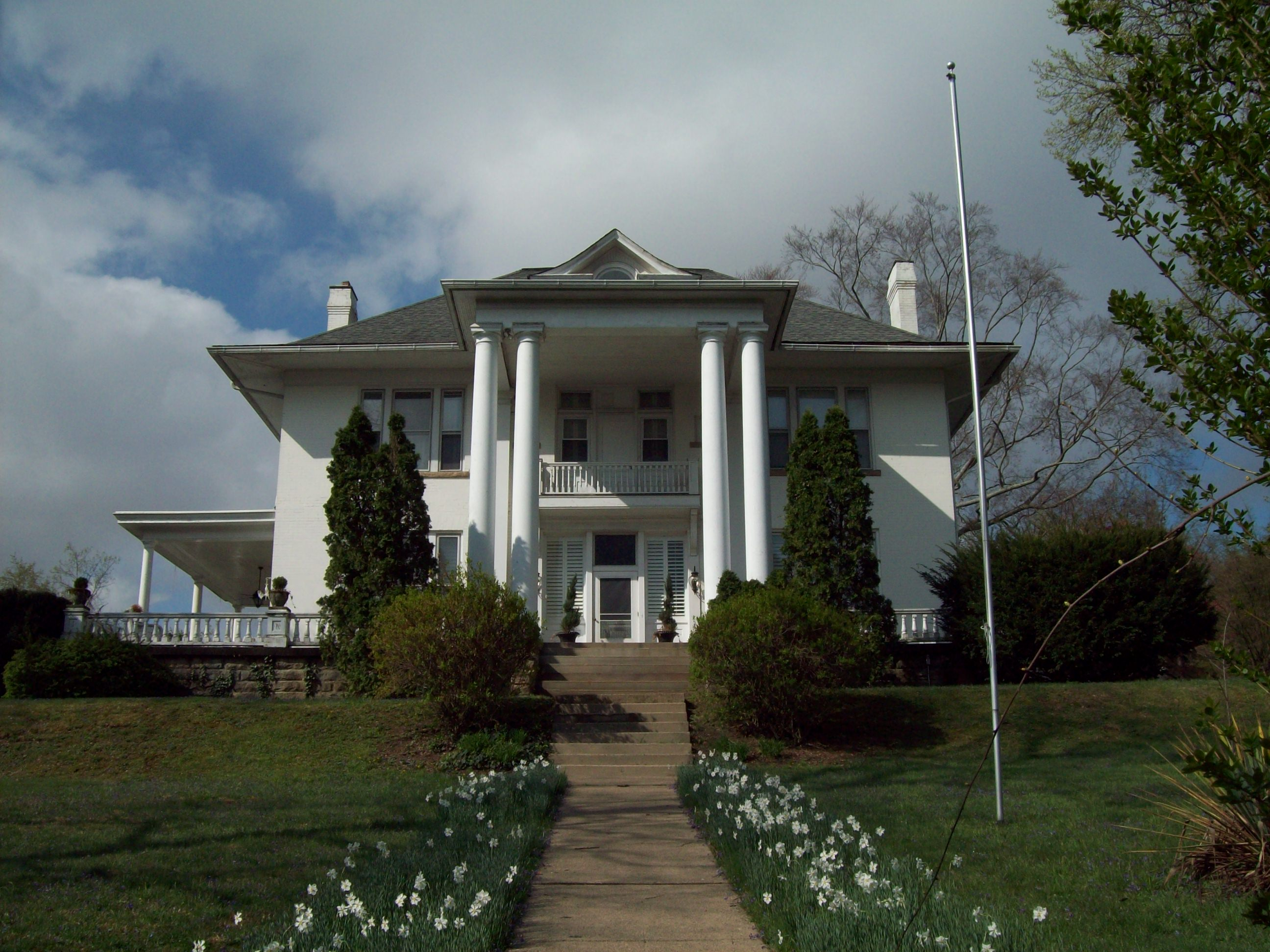
- Cox-Morton House, April 2009

- Location within West Virginia Location within the United States
- Location: 640 Holley Rd., Charleston, West Virginia
- Coordinates: 38°20′51″N 81°38′41″W
- Area: 3.1 acres (1.3 ha)
- Built: 1902
- Architect: Calderwood, Andrew
- Architectural style: American Four Square
- MPS: South Hills MRA
- NRHP reference No.: 84000399
- Added to NRHP: October 26, 1984

Cox-Morton House, also known as Home Hall, is a historic home located at Charleston, West Virginia. It was built in 1902, for Frank Cox, secretary of Republic Coal Co., the West Virginia Colliery Co., and the Carbon Coal Co. He was known in West Virginia as the "Great Wildcatter". His daughter Alice Boyd Cox married James Morton of the Morton Coal Co. It is an American Foursquare-style house. It features a ballustrated terrace around two sides of the house and a doric portico, added in the 1920s.

It was listed on the National Register of Historic Places in 1984 as part of the South Hills Multiple Resource Area.
