= Veterans Memorial Stadium (League City) =

Multipurpose stadium in League City, Texas

- District Stadium
- Interactive map of Veterans Memorial Stadium
- Former names: Clear Creek ISD District Stadium (1957–2007)
- Location: 2305 East Main Street; League City, Texas 77573
- Coordinates: 29°31′36″N 95°04′23″W
- Owner: Clear Creek Independent School District
- Operator: Clear Creek Independent School District
- Capacity: 8,200
- Surface: Astro Play

Construction
- Opened: 1957
- Renovated: 2004

Tenants
- Clear Brook High School; Clear Creek High School; Clear Falls High School; Clear Lake High School; Clear Springs High School

Veterans Memorial Stadium, often referred to simply as District Stadium, is a multi-purpose stadium located in League City, Texas on the campus of Clear Creek High School. It is currently one of two stadiums in the Clear Creek Independent School District (CCISD) and supports five 6A high schools in the district primarily for football games. The stadium also hosts some of the district's soccer, frisbee, and golf practice games. Veterans Memorial Stadium is also home to the high school's powder puff football games.

Veterans Memorial Stadium recent updates include 2013 Bond (~$2M) to replace turf and bleacher safety and improvements. On May 5, 2017, $687.7k (2020 dollars) was planned as part of a $486M bond, passing with 63.59% of the vote. These updates will be for parking, utility, dressing room, and concession stand.

Clear Creek is in Texas District 24-6A and has 12 University Scholastic League (UIL) sports. Clear Creek ISD has recently opened a new stadium on March 10, 2016, Challenger Columbia Stadium, to alleviate the strain placed on Veterans Memorial Stadium by five, comprehensive 6A high schools.
