= Clear View High School =

Location
- 800 South Walnut; Webster, Texas 77598; United States; 29.5322°N 95.1207°W

Information
- Type: Public High School
- Established: 1938
- School district: Clear Creek Independent School District
- Principal: Mrs. Monica Speaks
- Staff: 25.95 (FTE)
- Grades: 9-12
- Enrollment: 168 (2022-2023)
- Student to teacher ratio: 6.47
- Language: English
- Colours: Gold, Black
- Mascot: Tiger
- Accreditations: Academically Acceptable (2010-11)
- Website: Official Website

Clear View High School is a secondary school located in Webster, Texas, in the Clear Creek Independent School District. The school serves all of CCISD, including the cities of Kemah, Clear Lake Shores, Nassau Bay, Webster, El Lago, and Taylor Lake Village and portions of Houston, Pasadena, Friendswood, and League City.

The school colors are black and gold and the school mascot is the tiger.

Clear View High School does not have school team sports; however, the school includes physical education.

Clear View High School also includes the Special Education department and Communities In School, which opened a second department when the school opened for the new school year in August 2007.

== Overview ==
Clear View began as the Alternative Learning Center for CCISD and is designed to serve the needs of the at-risk student population for the district. Clear View does this by allowing students to start over on their journey toward academic success in a unique educational environment while providing small classes (a maximum of 12 students in all core academic classes), excellent teachers, innovative instruction, extra tutoring, opportunities for remedial work and credit recovery, less distractions, excellent technology, programs which lead to job certifications in the areas of health care and cosmetology and a support system to help with other issues that can make the school years difficult. Through smaller classes and individualized attention, students feel connected to an academic community that emphasizes success as its top priority. This smaller learning environment allows for each student to receive one-on-one attention from teachers and administration to specifically meet his or her educational needs.

It is now the first of two district charter schools, with Clear Horizons Early College High School being the other, and can enroll up to 300 students in grades 8 – 12.

As of the 2010–11 school year, Clear View has an Academically Acceptable campus rating.

== History ==
The school opened in 1938. Initially it was in the Webster High School facility.

On July 22, 2013, CCISD's board of trustees unanimously approved a name change for Clear View High School, becoming the sixth high school in Clear Creek ISD.

In January 2022 the current building, adjacent to the previous one, is scheduled to open. The building had a cost of $45 million. Depending on the scenario, the student capacity may be as low as 250 or as high as 350. The district plans to raze the former building in the beginning of that year.
