= Clear Lake City (Greater Houston) =

- Housing development
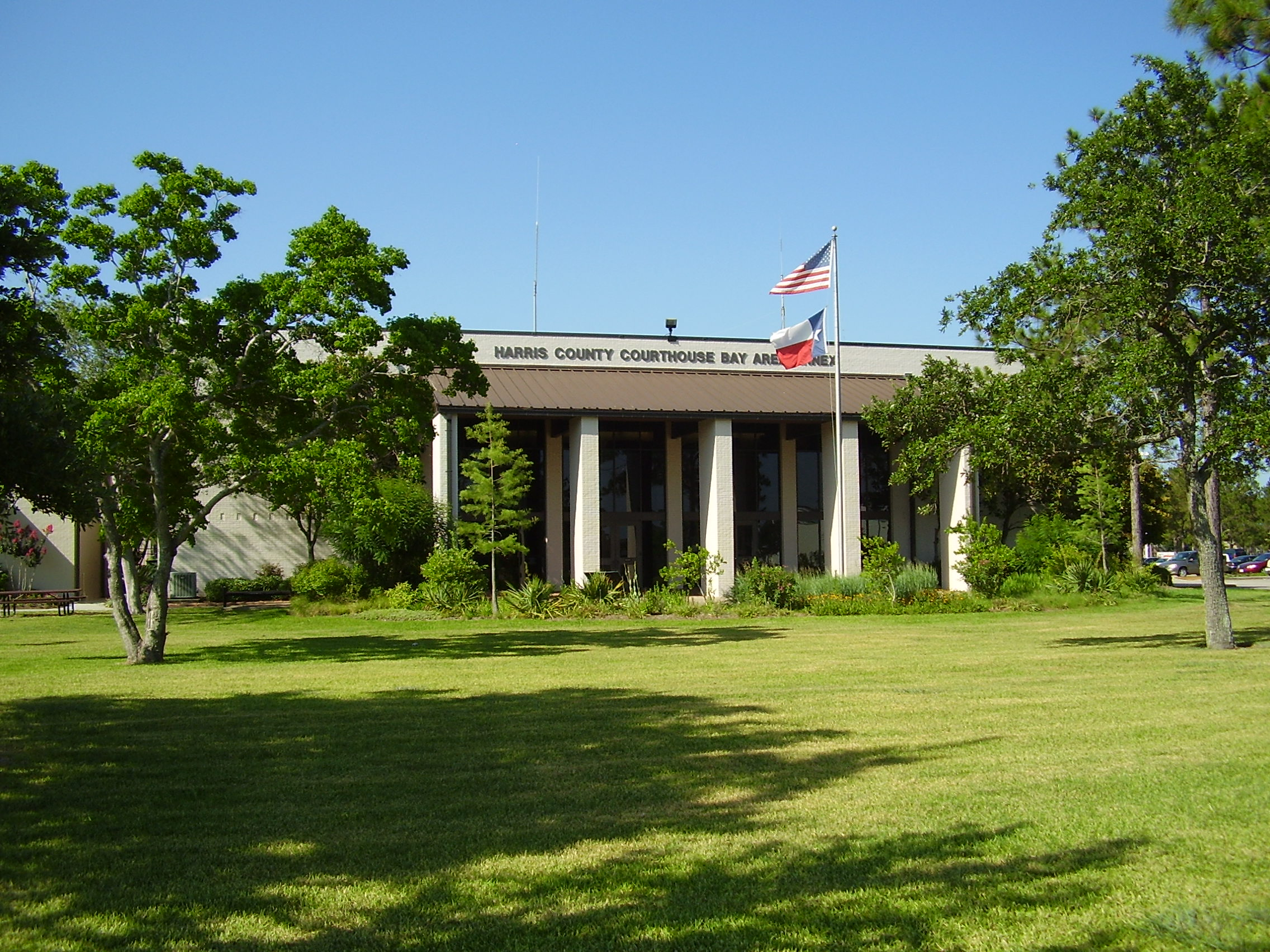
- Harris County Courthouse Bay Area Annex

- Location within the state of Texas Clear Lake City (the United States)
- Coordinates: 29°33′18″N 95°6′54″W
- Country: United States
- State: Texas
- County: Harris
- Elevation: 20 ft (6 m)
- Time zone: UTC-6 (Central (CST))
  - Summer (DST): UTC-5 (CDT)
- Area codes: 281, 713, 832
- GNIS feature ID: 1377174

Clear Lake City is a master-planned community located in southeast Harris County, Texas, within the Bay Area of Greater Houston. It is the second-largest master-planned community in Houston – behind Kingwood. The majority of the community lies in the corporate limits of Houston. Some parts are in Pasadena, and a small eastern portion is within the city limits of Taylor Lake Village.

The community is adjacent to NASA's Johnson Space Center, as well as other major aerospace companies—including Boeing and Lockheed-Martin. The community and its adjacent areas have a high concentration of engineers due to both NASA and the local petrochemical and biomedical industries.

== History ==
The first substantial development on the land Clear Lake City now occupies was accomplished by James Marion West, who came to Texas from Mississippi as a boy in 1880. West became a wealthy businessman with interests in ranching, lumber, and oil. His main ranch property and the site of his home was around the shores of Clear Lake and Clear Creek.

Humble Oil (now ExxonMobil) purchased the property from West in 1938 after oil was discovered. Most of the property remained undeveloped until, following the decision to establish the Johnson Space Center in the area, Humble Oil's venture, the Friendswood Development Company, made plans to establish a residential development. The company established the Clear Lake City Community Association, Inc. (CLCCA) in 1963.

Clear Lake City was the former location of the Clear Lake City STOLport, a private airport constructed and owned by Houston Metro Airlines which was located on State Highway 3 just south of Ellington Field. This commuter airline operated up to 22 roundtrip flights every weekday in the mid-1970s between Clear Lake City (CLC) and Houston Intercontinental Airport (IAH) with de Havilland DHC-6 Twin Otter STOL (short take off and landing) turboprop aircraft. Metro Airlines eventually ceased operations due to financial challenges. The Clear Lake City STOLport was subsequently abandoned and then demolished. There is no trace of this pioneering airfield to be found at the present time, and the land has been developed for commercial and residential use.

The portion of Clear Lake City that was Houston's extraterritorial jurisdiction (ETJ) was annexed by the city of Houston in 1977 despite a grass-roots campaign by its residents to stop it. Their slogan was "Free The Clear Lake 25,000!" Lawsuits over the annexation resulted in the conversion of Houston city government from at-large city councilmen to the current-day nine district and five at-large council seats. The 1977 annexation added 3,174 acres (1,284 ha) of land to the Houston city limits. At the time, under a Texas law established in 1963, a city of more than 100,000 people could unilaterally annex an unincorporated area. Proponents stated that the annexation allowed Houston to maintain a healthy tax base which would therefore keep taxes low and stimulate economic growth. This meant Texas cities would avoid the fates of Northern cities, locked in by other cities, which saw their tax bases relocate out of their respective city limits.

The eastern portion in Pasadena's extraterritorial jurisdiction (ETJ) was eventually annexed by the city of Pasadena.

Since 1980, part of Clear Lake City within the Houston City Limits is located in Council District E.

From the 1980 U.S. Census to the 1990 Census, many Asian-Americans settled in Clear Lake City. They were mostly Chinese American, Indian American, and Pakistani American with some Vietnamese Americans.

== Etymology ==
The community was named Clear Lake City for Clear Lake, which lies south of the Johnson Space Center and, along with Clear Creek, separates Harris County from Galveston County. The lake is effectively the mouth of Clear Creek which empties into Galveston Bay.

== Government and infrastructure ==
=== Local government ===
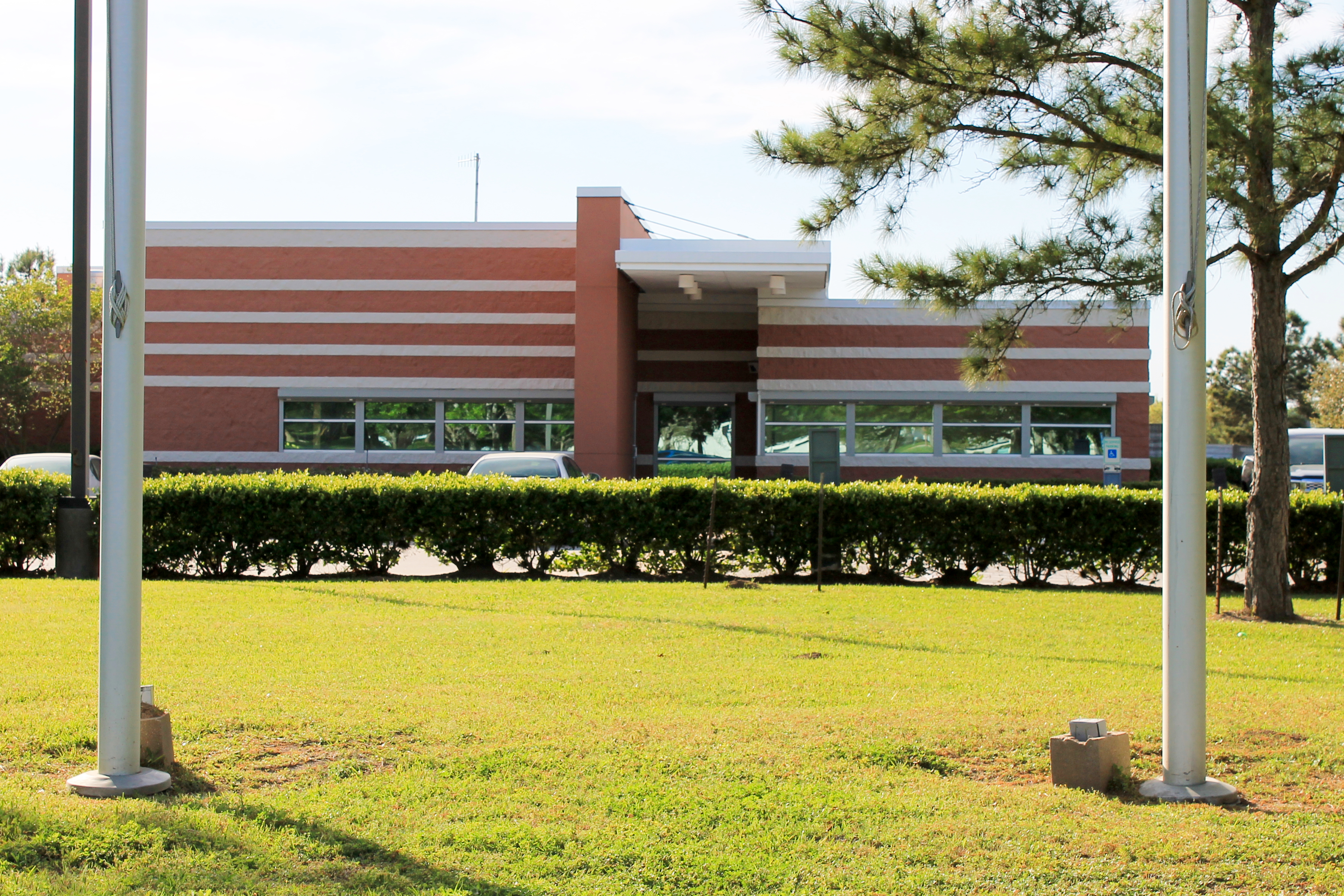
Houston Police Department Clear Lake Station

The Clear Lake City Water Authority serves the community. The authority was created on May 6, 1963, by House Bill 1003 during the regular session of the 58th Legislature of Texas. When it was created the authority had 12,269 acres (49.65 km^{2}; 19.170 sq mi) of land in its jurisdiction. Due to annexations, as of 2009 the authority now has 16,098 acres (65.15 km^{2}; 25.153 sq mi) of land in its jurisdiction.

Houston City Council District E serves portions of Clear Lake City within Houston.

Harris Health System (formerly Harris County Hospital District) designated Strawberry Health Center in Pasadena for ZIP code 77058. The nearest public hospital is Ben Taub General Hospital in the Texas Medical Center.

==== Fire service ====
The area was served from 1963 until sometime in the mid- to late-1990s by the Clear Lake City Volunteer Fire Department (CLCVFD). The CLCCA funded the CLCVFD and the CLCWA provided the fire station and surrounding land. When the CLCVFD ceased operations due to reduced funding as a result of Houston's annexation of the majority of CLCVFD's service area, the building did a brief stint as the headquarters of the Clear Lake Emergency Medical Corps (CLEMC). The building is currently a maintenance depot for the CLCWA, which has held title to the building and surrounding land since the CLCWA's inception. The fire departments of Houston, Pasadena, and Taylor Lake Village currently serve sections of Clear Lake City. The Houston Fire Department serves areas of Clear Lake City within the City of Houston limits. In 1978, City of Houston officials contracted with the Lyndon B. Johnson Space Center to open a fire station on the base. The city introduced plans to provide services for the Pipers Meadow area, which was annexed in 1994. A new Houston fire station #94 serving Piper's Meadow, Sterling Knoll, and surrounding areas within the city was built in January 2005. This new fire station had a price of $2,644,438.

==== Police service ====
The police departments of Houston, Pasadena, and Taylor Lake Village serve sections of Clear Lake City. The Houston Police Department serves areas of Clear Lake City within the City of Houston limits. The Clear Lake Patrol Division serves the portion of Clear Lake City in Houston. Pasadena Police Department is the police department for Pasadena. The police department for Taylor Lake Village is the Lakeview Police Department, formed in January 1987 by a merger of the police departments of Taylor Lake Village and El Lago. Police protection is also provided by the Harris County Sheriff's Office (HCSO) and the Harris County Precinct 8 Constable's Office (HCCO Pct 8).

=== County, state, and federal representation ===
Harris County operates the County Courthouse Bay Area Annex, including a tax office, on Buccaneer Lane in Clear Lake City, Houston.

The United States Postal Service operates the Albert Thomas Post Office on El Camino Real Drive in Houston and the Nassau Bay Post Office on Upper Bay Road in Nassau Bay, near Clear Lake City.

== Neighborhoods ==
Clear Lake City is itself subdivided into various neighborhoods. These include Bay Forest, Bay Glen, Bay Knoll, Bay Oaks, Bay Pointe, Brook Forest, Brookwood, Clear Lake Forest, Camino South, Meadowgreen, Middlebrook, Northfork, Oakbrook, Oakbrook West, Pipers Meadow, and Pinebrook. The growth of the subdivisions in Clear Lake resulted from the employment of thousands of people by NASA's then-new Manned Spacecraft Center (now the Lyndon B. Johnson Space Center). Land values rose nearly 300%.

In the neighborhood of Timber Cove, the local pool was designed in the shape of the Mercury capsule. It was completed in 1963.

== Transportation ==
Metropolitan Transit Authority of Harris County (METRO) operates the Bay Area Park and Ride. In addition Harris County Transit operates services going through Clear Lake City.

== Education ==
=== Primary and secondary schools ===
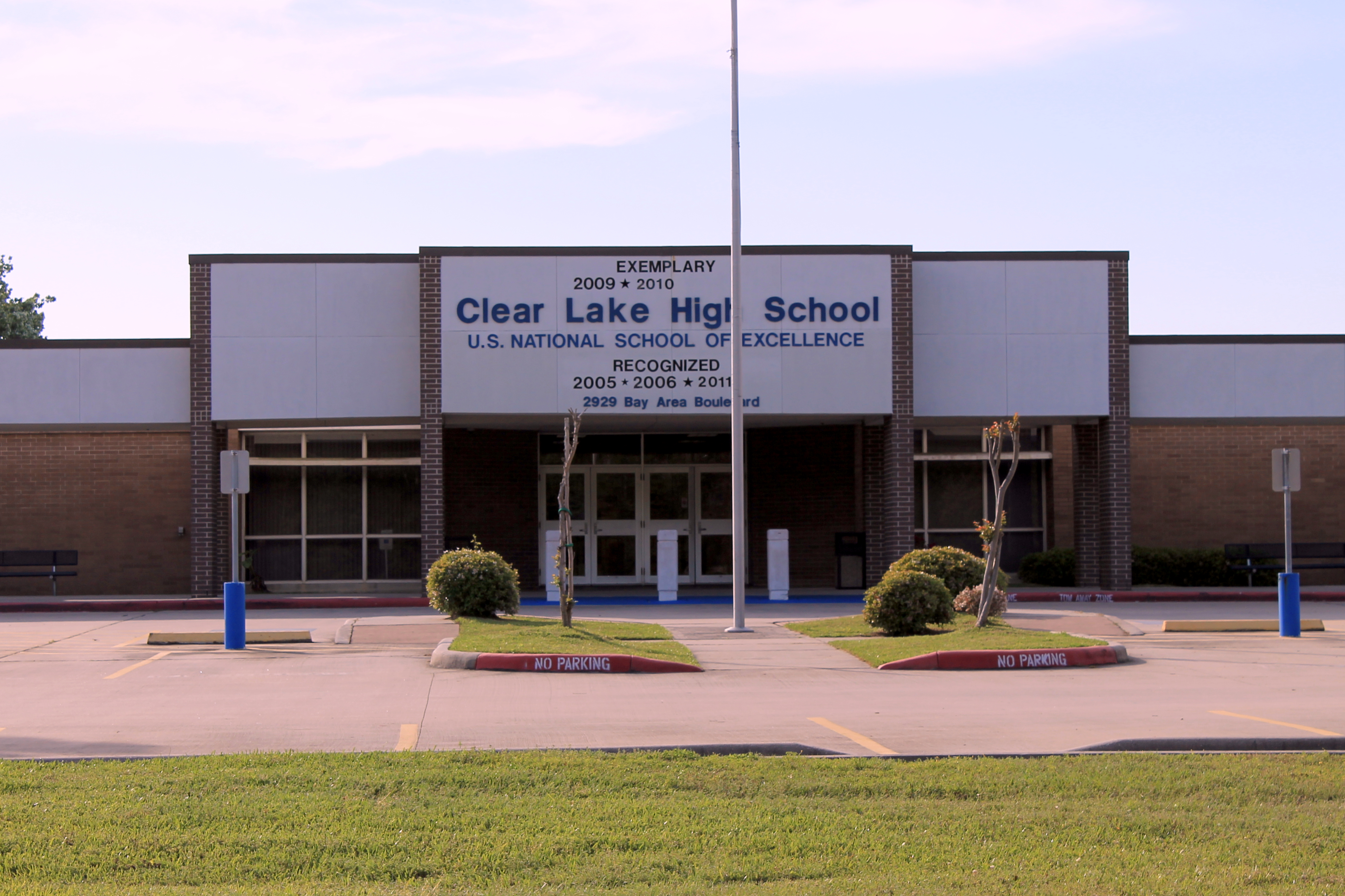
Clear Lake High School

Clear Lake City is served by the Clear Creek Independent School District. The community is divided between CCISD Board of Trustees Districts 2 and 3. As of 2008, they are represented by Win Weber and Ken Baliker, respectively. six high schools in the district, Clear Lake High School, Clear Creek High School, Clear Springs High School, Clear View High School, Clear Falls High School, and Clear Brook High School, serve the community.

Clear Lake Intermediate School and Space Center Intermediate School serve sections of Clear Lake City. Clear Lake Intermediate was named a National Blue Ribbon School in 1986–87.

The Roman Catholic Archdiocese of Galveston-Houston operates the St. Clare of Assisi school in the community. St. Bernadette Catholic Church also offers early childhood education. The Clear Lake Christian School is located in the Bay Knoll neighborhood in Clear Lake City.

=== Colleges and universities ===
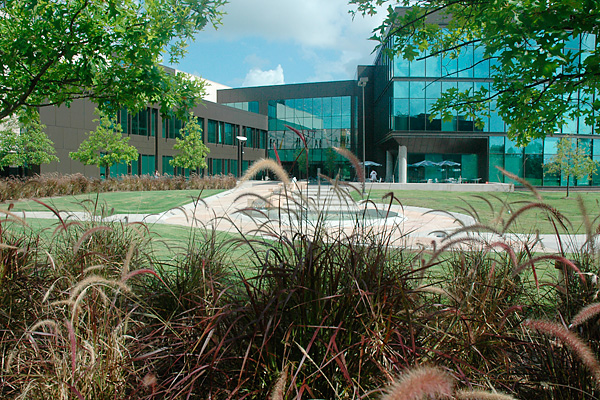
University of Houston–Clear Lake

The University of Houston–Clear Lake is adjacent to the community (the majority of the 520-acre (2.1 km^{2}) UHCL campus lies in the corporate limits of Pasadena, while the part of campus south of Horsepen Bayou lies in the city of Houston).

Residents of the Harris County part of Clear Creek ISD (and therefore Clear Lake City) are zoned to San Jacinto College.

== Properties ==
From 1961 until 1992, the Lunar and Planetary Institute was housed in the mansion until it moved to a bigger, more modern building. In 2013 the property was sold to former basketball player Hakeem Olajuwon's property management company, and for years it was a high-end men's clothing store called DR34M ("Dream", after Olajuwon's nickname and with a stylized "34" representing his jersey number). The mansion was demolished in November 2019.

=== Public libraries ===
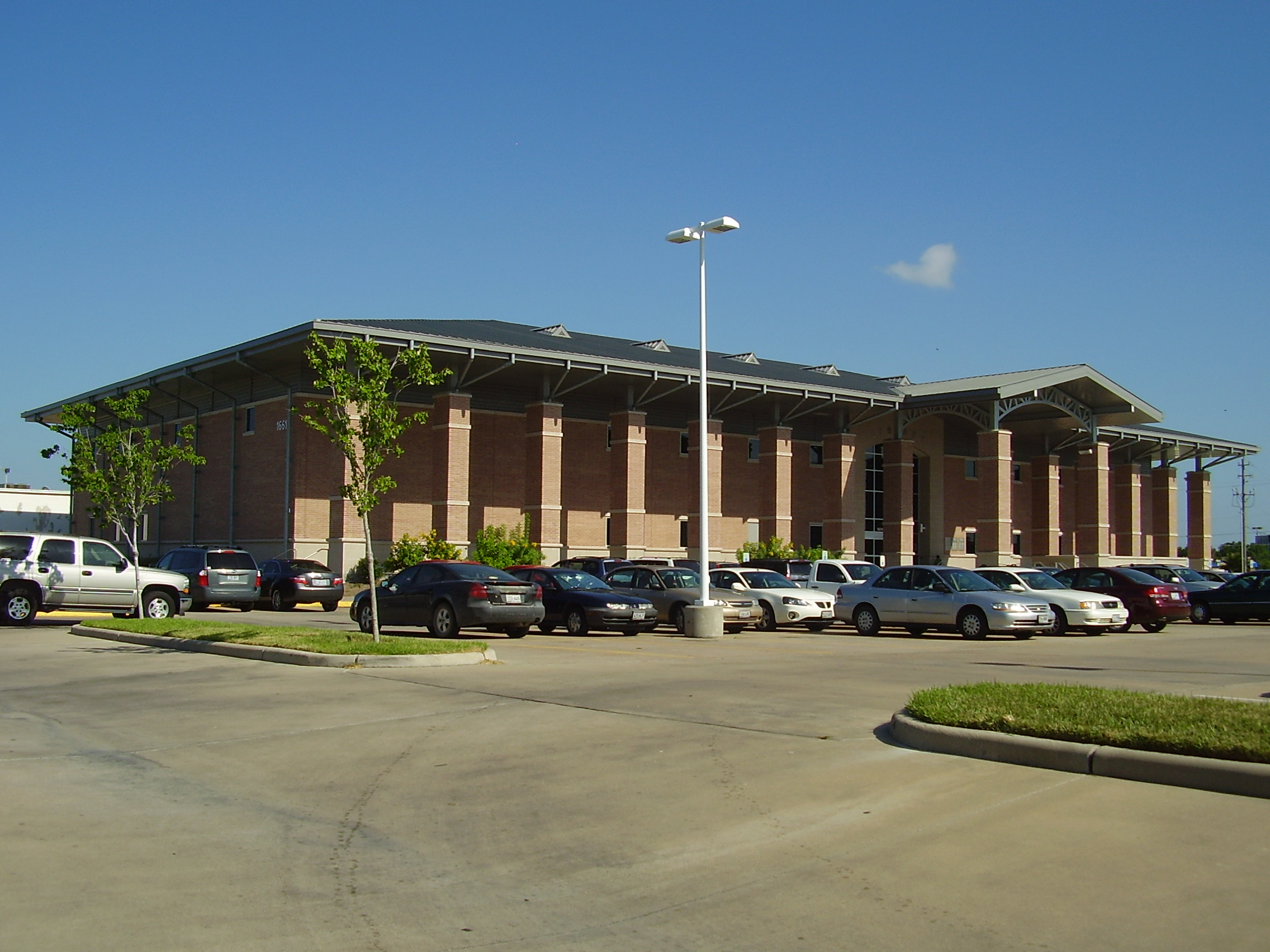
Clear Lake City–County Freeman Branch

The 42,000 square feet (3,900 m^{2}) Clear Lake City–County Freeman Branch is administered by Harris County Public Library, and is funded in part by the Houston Public Library. The Freeman Branch Library, named after Theodore C. Freeman, opened in 1964. It moved to the Harris County multipurpose annex in 1976. The current city-county facility opened in 2004. The Friends of the Freeman Library raises $80,000 annually to fund the library.

=== Gallery of schools ===
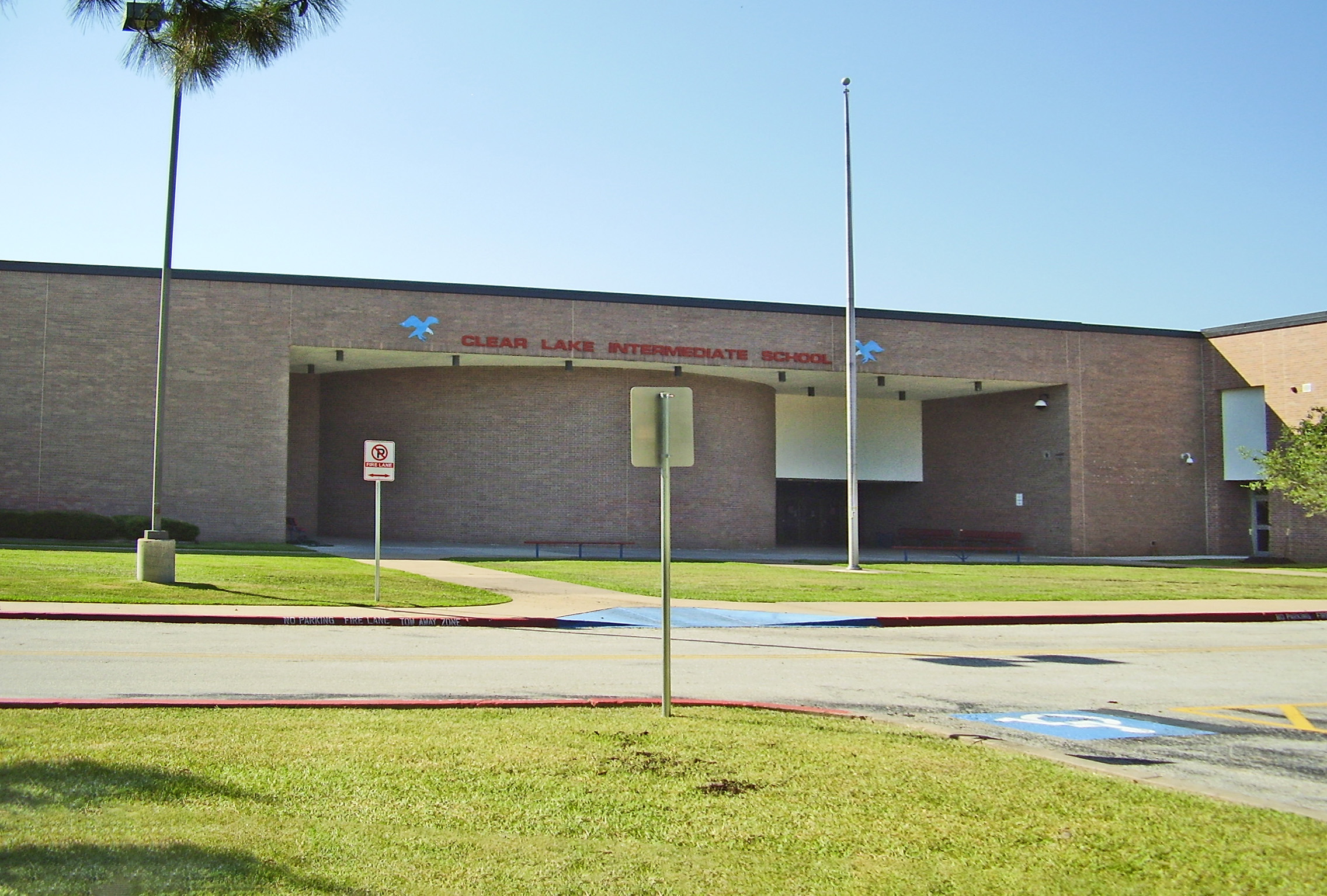
Clear Lake Intermediate School

== Parks and recreation ==
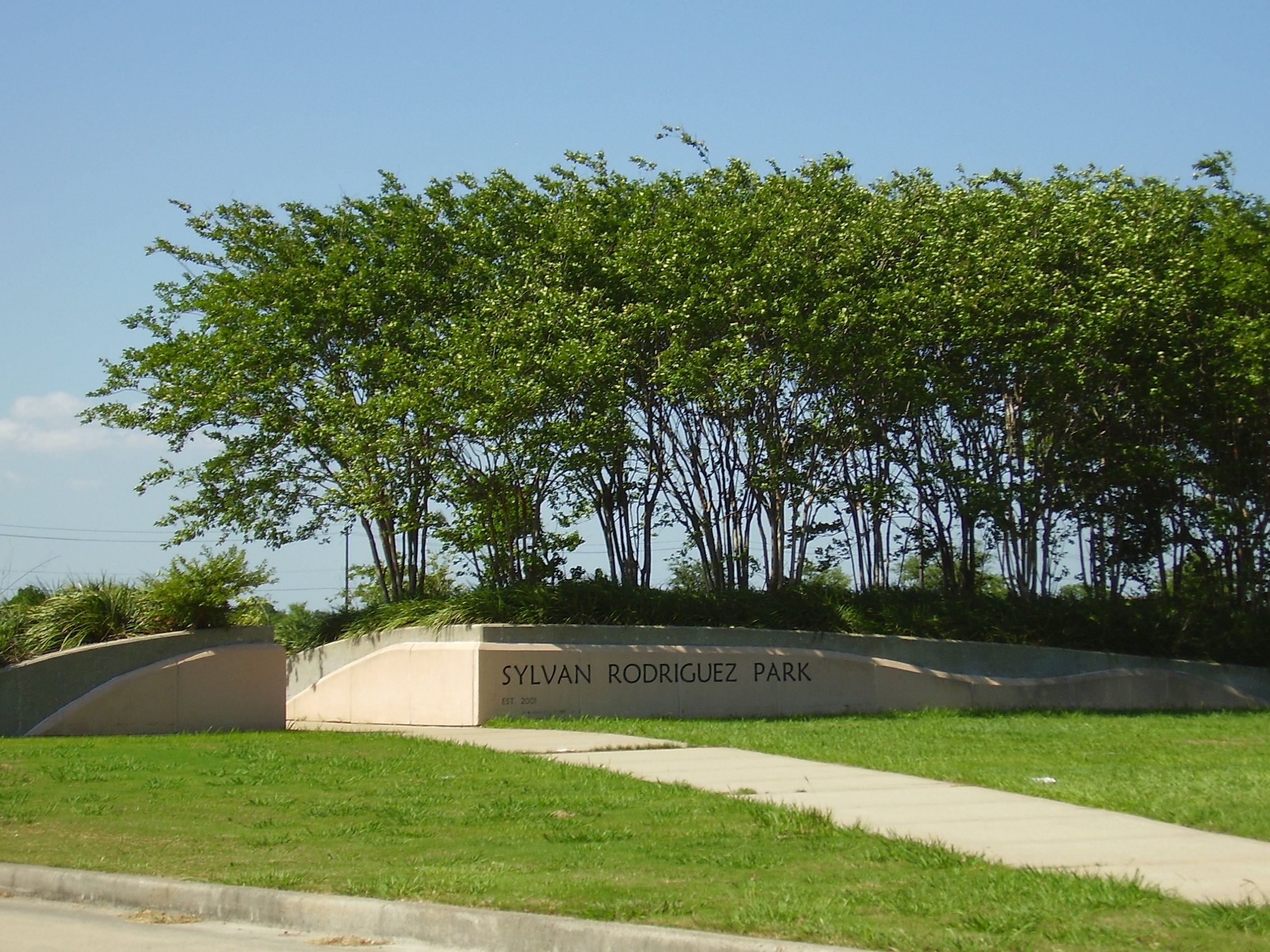
Sylvan Rodriguez Park

The City of Houston operates the Sylvan Rodriguez Park on Clear Lake City Boulevard. In 1991 the city purchased a 111.46 acres (45.11 ha) property for $1,399,000. In 1999 the city appropriated $2.5 million to begin building the park. In 2001 the park received its current name. Bay Area Park is also home to an off leash dog park, which offers both small dog and large dog areas. It is located on Bay Area Blvd next to the University of Houston Clear Lake and the Armand Bayou Nature Center.

The Clear Lake City Community Association, Inc. (CLCAA) operates the Kermet H. Applewhite Sports and Recreation Center at 16511 Diana Lane. The center includes an indoor heated pool, a fitness room, several outdoor pools, an air-conditioned gymnasium, and tennis courts.

The Clear Lake Golf Course opened in 1963 and closed in 2005. It took up about 180 acres (73 ha) of land. The Clear Lake City Water Authority (CLCWA) took possession of the property. The CLCWA proposed a storm detention area and a dog park for the former property.

== Culture ==
A number of cultural events occur in and near the community. The Bay Area Houston Ballet and Theatre group stages ballet and American musical theater performances. The Clear Lake Symphony offers performances each year from classical to "pops". The Arts Alliance at Clear Lake, a group of 50 area arts organizations, regularly schedules arts exhibits, musical performances, and other arts programs.

The Gulf Coast Film Festival annually showcases independent films from local, regional and international artists in various categories ranging from short films to documentaries. The Ballunar Festival is an annual hot-air balloon spectacular. The Wings over Houston Air Fest at Ellington Field offers air acrobatics by military and civilian pilots.

== Notable people ==
- Bobby Burling, soccer player
- Queen Mary of Denmark
- Ellison Onizuka, one of the seven astronauts killed in the Challenger disaster and first Asian American to go into space.
- Kevin Kwan, Singaporean–American novelist best known for his satirical novels Crazy Rich Asians, China Rich Girlfriend, and Rich People Problems

== See also ==
- Clear Lake (region)
- Galveston Bay Area
- Armand Bayou Nature Center
