= Bay Forest, Houston =

Bay Forest
- Neighborhood
- Interactive map of Bay Forest
- Coordinates: 29°35′N 95°7′W
- Country: United States
- State: Texas
- County: Harris
- City: Houston
- Established: November 18, 1985

Government
  - President: Dana Williams
  - Vice President: Javier Rodriguez

Area
  - Total: 0.47 sq mi (1.21 km^{2})
- Elevation: 26 ft (8 m)
- Website: http://www.bayforest.info

Bay Forest is a community located in the southeast corner of Houston, Texas in Houston's Bay Area. It is part of a family of neighborhoods collectively called Clear Lake City. It is a bedroom community made up almost entirely of single-family homes, parks, and other open areas. The community comprises 832 residences and is located on either side of El Dorado Boulevard between Space Center Boulevard and Horsepen Bayou.

The Bay Forest Community Association was officially established with the filing of deed restrictions with Harris County on November 18, 1985.

== Parks ==
Bay Forest residents enjoy the amenities provided by the following community parks:

- Bay Forest Park - a 5.7 acres (23,000 m^{2}) park offering:
  - Shaded picnic areas
  - Open recreation areas
  - An enclosed 165,000-US-gallon (620 m^{3}), 25 yard (23 m) pool with six lanes 3–5 feet (0.91–1.52 m) deep and a 12 ft (3.7 m) diving well, a 1.5 ft (0.5 m) wading pool, pool deck furniture, two grills, a main building with bathrooms and showers, a 1,240 square feet (115 m^{2}) pavilion shelter, and two gazebos
  - Four controlled access tennis courts with night lighting available
  - Two "Big Toy" playground areas with a full assortment of children’s activity platforms
  - Six picnic tables and benches
  - 16 paved parking spaces
- Willow Shores Park - a 3 acres (12,000 m^{2}) park offering:
  - Open sports fields for soccer, football, or any imaginable activity with adjacent shaded areas and benches
  - A concrete, full-court basketball court with one backboard
  - Six picnic tables and benches
  - A modern metal structure playground on 3,500 square feet (330 m^{2}) of beach sand
  - 29 paved parking spaces
- Bay Forest Wildlife Preserve - a 10.3 acres (42,000 m^{2}) habitat of indigenous flora and fauna unique to Gulf Coast riparian reserves that includes a 0.5 mile (800 m) crushed granite trail for exploring or exercising. Located in the southeast corner of the neighborhood adjacent to Horsepen Bayou, it provides residents with a quiet retreat from city life. The park is owned by the Houston Parks Board and leased to the community.
- Pocket Park - a 1 acre (4,000 m^{2}) shaded, grassy park consisting of two parcels separated by a street. It includes a concrete walking path and four benches.
- Erin Creek Island Park - a shaded, 1,200 square feet (110 m^{2}) mini park with five benches for resting or meeting neighbors.

== Police/Fire Service ==
Houston Police Department's Clear Lake Patrol Division provides police services to the Bay Forest community. Fire protection and emergency medical services are provided primarily through Fire Station 71 of the Houston Fire Department.

== Public Education ==
Bay Forest is served by the Clear Creek Independent School District, and local public school students attend Falcon Pass Elementary School, Space Center Intermediate School, and Clear Lake High School.
