= Seabrook, Texas =

City in Harris County, Texas

- City
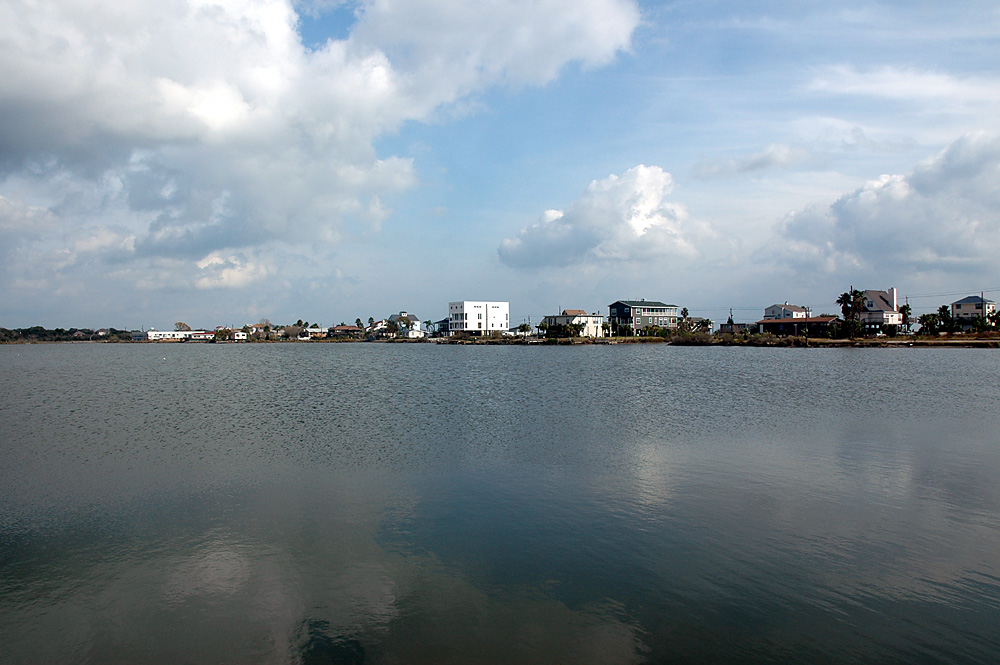
- Lower Todville Road
- Motto: "As Grand By Land as By Bay, and Why Many Choose to Stay."
- Location in Harris County and the state of Texas
- Coordinates: 29°33′44″N 95°01′24″W
- Country: United States
- State: Texas
- Counties: Harris
- Incorporated: 1961

Government
  - Type: Council–manager
  - Mayor: Jim Sweeney
  - City Manager: Gayle Cook

Area
  - Total: 21.26 sq mi (55.06 km^{2})
  - Land: 5.32 sq mi (13.77 km^{2})
  - Water: 15.94 sq mi (41.29 km^{2})
- Elevation: 0 ft (0 m)

Population (2020)
  - Total: 13,618
  - Density: 2,585.7/sq mi (998.33/km^{2})
- Time zone: UTC-6 (CST)
  - Summer (DST): UTC-5 (CDT)
- ZIP code: 77586
- Area codes: 713, 281, 832, 346, 621
- FIPS code: 48-66392
- GNIS feature ID: 2411847
- Website: The City of Seabrook, Texas

Seabrook is a city in Harris County, Texas, United States, with some water surface area located within Chambers and Galveston counties. The population was 13,618 at the 2020 U.S. census. Several fish markets line the city's waterfront, while antique shops and bed and breakfast establishments are found in the city's downtown area.

== History ==
Seabrook is known for its fish markets on Waterfront Drive where resident shrimpers and fishermen bring in their catches daily. Besides bordering the bay, the city encompasses marshes through which runoff from inland fields drain to the bay. The piece of land was purchased by Seabrook W. Sydnor, who was the son of Galveston mayor and slave trader John Seabrook Sydnor, in 1895. In March 1903, the Seabrook Company of Houston created a layout of the proposed Seabrook Town site. The new town attracted fishermen, merchants and even a few residents.

The Galveston Hurricane of 1900 demolished the local school, but by 1905 it was restored and was run by three teachers who taught 100 students. The local schools became part of the Clear Creek Independent School District in 1947. The population of Seabrook rose from 200 to 560 before the Great Depression, but fell to 200 in 1936, and remained at 400 from 1940 until 1947, when the Albert and Ernest Fay shipyard opened. It could handle 150 boats, and opened up jobs and is the main cause of the population increase. Despite damage from Hurricane Carla, a bridge linking Seabrook and Kemah was completed in 1961. With the opening of the bridge and the Johnson Space Center (JSC) in Houston, Seabrook's population rose to approximately 6,000.

In 1986, the decision was made to start the construction of a fixed-span bridge that was tall enough for sailboats to pass under. After this bridge was finished, Highway 146 was linked all the way from Galveston to Texas State Highway 225. This spurred a further increase in the population of Seabrook to its present level of nearly 12,000 people.

== Geography ==
Seabrook is located on Galveston Bay at Clear Lake, southeast of Houston near Pasadena and La Porte. According to the United States Census Bureau, the city has a total area of 21.3 square miles (55.1 km^{2}), of which 5.3 square miles (13.8 km^{2}) is land and 15.9 square miles (41.3 km^{2}), or 74.97%, is water.

Buildings in the El Jardin del Mar neighborhood have postal addresses saying "Seabrook, Texas", but this neighborhood is not in the Seabrook city limits. It was annexed by Pasadena after a 1970 annexation agreement.

=== Climate ===
Seabrook has an oceanic and humid subtropical climate, with consistent rainfall throughout the year, but usually with heavier amounts during the hot and humid summer months.

Climate data for Seabrook, Texas
Month	Jan	Feb	Mar	Apr	May	Jun	Jul	Aug	Sep	Oct	Nov	Dec	Year
Record high °F (°C)	85 (29)	90 (32)	96 (36)	93 (34)	100 (38)	106 (41)	106 (41)	106 (41)	108 (42)	96 (36)	90 (32)	84 (29)	108 (42)
Mean daily maximum °F (°C)	61 (16)	64 (18)	70 (21)	77 (25)	83 (28)	88 (31)	91 (33)	91 (33)	87 (31)	80 (27)	71 (22)	64 (18)	77 (25)
Mean daily minimum °F (°C)	43 (6)	46 (8)	53 (12)	61 (16)	68 (20)	73 (23)	75 (24)	75 (24)	71 (22)	61 (16)	53 (12)	46 (8)	60 (16)
Record low °F (°C)	10 (−12)	14 (−10)	22 (−6)	22 (−6)	44 (7)	56 (13)	45 (7)	61 (16)	50 (10)	33 (1)	25 (−4)	9 (−13)	9 (−13)
Average precipitation inches (mm)	3.87 (98)	3.32 (84)	3.20 (81)	3.25 (83)	4.75 (121)	7.10 (180)	4.66 (118)	5.06 (129)	5.21 (132)	5.99 (152)	4.32 (110)	4.03 (102)	54.76 (1,390)
Average snowfall inches (cm)	0.2 (0.51)	trace	0 (0)	0 (0)	0 (0)	0 (0)	0 (0)	0 (0)	0 (0)	0 (0)	0 (0)	trace	0.2 (0.51)
Source 1:
Source 2:

== Demographics ==
Historical population
Census	Pop.	Note	%±
1970	3,811		—
1980	4,670		22.5%
1990	6,685		43.1%
2000	9,443		41.3%
2010	11,952		26.6%
2020	13,618		13.9%
U.S. Decennial Census

=== Racial and ethnic composition ===
Seabrook city, Texas – Racial and ethnic composition Note: the US Census treats Hispanic/Latino as an ethnic category. This table excludes Latinos from the racial categories and assigns them to a separate category. Hispanics/Latinos may be of any race.
Race / Ethnicity (NH = Non-Hispanic)	Pop 2000	Pop 2010	Pop 2020	% 2000	% 2010	% 2020
White alone (NH)	7,731	8,997	9,136	81.87%	75.28%	67.09%
Black or African American alone (NH)	195	468	678	2.07%	3.92%	4.98%
Native American or Alaska Native alone (NH)	43	44	51	0.46%	0.37%	0.37%
Asian alone (NH)	313	517	528	3.31%	4.33%	3.88%
Native Hawaiian or Pacific Islander alone (NH)	2	2	6	0.02%	0.02%	0.04%
Other race alone (NH)	3	16	74	0.03%	0.13%	0.54%
Mixed race or Multiracial (NH)	139	207	634	1.47%	1.73%	4.66%
Hispanic or Latino (any race)	1,017	1,701	2,511	10.77%	14.23%	18.44%
Total	9,443	11,952	13,618	100.00%	100.00%	100.00%

=== 2020 census ===
As of the 2020 census, Seabrook had a population of 13,618 and a median age of 38.6 years. 21.3% of residents were under the age of 18 and 12.2% of residents were 65 years of age or older. For every 100 females there were 100.2 males, and for every 100 females age 18 and over there were 99.7 males age 18 and over. There were 5,723 households and 3,358 families residing in the city.

100.0% of residents lived in urban areas, while 0.0% lived in rural areas.

There were 5,723 households in Seabrook, of which 30.6% had children under the age of 18 living in them. Of all households, 46.3% were married-couple households, 21.9% were households with a male householder and no spouse or partner present, and 23.7% were households with a female householder and no spouse or partner present. About 31.1% of all households were made up of individuals and 7.1% had someone living alone who was 65 years of age or older.

There were 6,424 housing units, of which 10.9% were vacant. The homeowner vacancy rate was 2.0% and the rental vacancy rate was 15.8%.

=== 2010 census ===
The 2010 U.S. census reported Seabrook had a population of 11,952.

=== 2015–2019 American Community Survey ===
The racial and ethnic makeup of the city was 71.6% non-Hispanic white, 5.1% Black and African American, 2.2% Asian, 1.9% multiracial, and 20.7% Hispanic and Latin American of any race at the 2019 American Community Survey.

There were 5,479 households in 2019 with an average of 2.54 people per household. The median gross rent in the city was $1,161 and the median cost of an owner-occupied housing unit without a mortgage was $753. Seabrook's population had a median household income of $89,817 from 2015 to 2019 and per capita income of $47,447. Of the population, an estimated 8.5% lived at or below the poverty line within the city limits.

=== 2000 census ===
At the census of 2000, there were 9,443 people, 4,094 households, and 2,386 families residing in the city. The population density was 1,647.5 inhabitants per square mile (636.1/km^{2}). There were 4,536 housing units at an average density of 791.4 per square mile (305.6/km^{2}). The racial makeup of the city was 88.92% White, 2.11% African American, 0.51% Native American, 3.31% Asian, 0.02% Pacific Islander, 2.76% from other races, and 2.36% from two or more races. Hispanic or Latino of any race were 10.77% of the population.

There were 4,094 households, out of which 29.4% had children under the age of 18 living with them, 46.8% were married couples living together, 8.1% had a female householder with no husband present, and 41.7% were non-families. 34.0% of all households were made up of individuals, and 3.3% had someone living alone who was 65 years of age or older. The average household size was 2.31 and the average family size was 3.01.

In the city, the population was spread out, with 23.9% under the age of 18, 9.3% from 18 to 24, 38.4% from 25 to 44, 22.8% from 45 to 64, and 5.7% who were 65 years of age or older. The median age was 34 years. For every 100 females, there were 106.9 males. For every 100 females age 18 and over, there were 105.1 males.

The median income for a household in the city was $54,175, and the median income for a family was $66,815. Males had a median income of $50,322 versus $32,161 for females. The per capita income for the city was $29,534. About 2.8% of families and 5.5% of the population were below the poverty line, including 6.1% of those under age 18 and 5.1% of those age 65 or over.

The greater Seabrook postal area also includes the incorporated cities, both small suburban subdivisions organized as municipalities, of El Lago, Texas, and Taylor Lake Village.

== Arts and culture ==
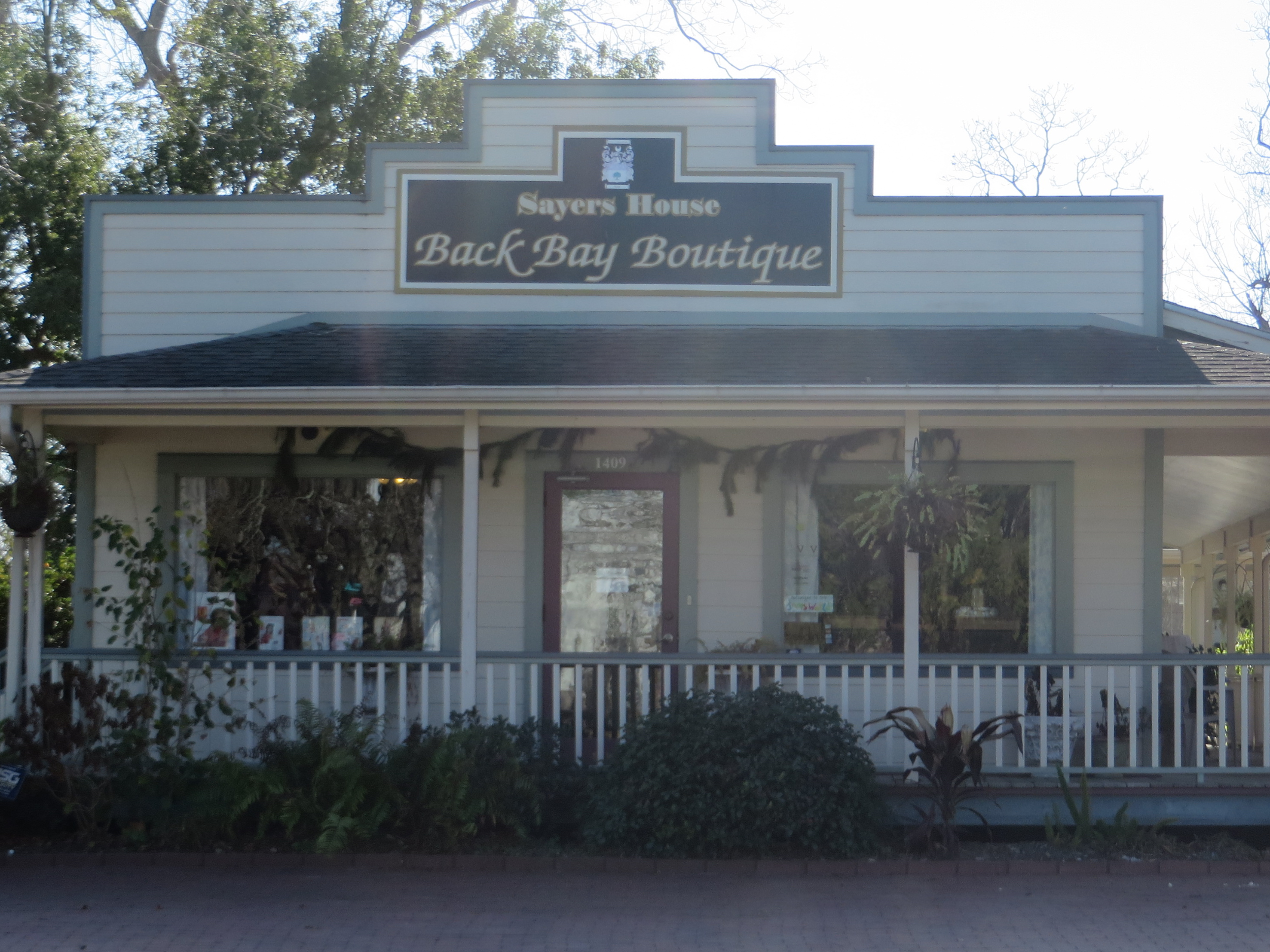
Boutique in the historic downtown section of Seabrook

A historic downtown area was constructed in the early 20th century and it stands today, with many locals running their businesses. Most are antique shops or bed and breakfast places.

Seabrook is host to the Texas Concours d'Elegance "Keels & Wheels" classic car and boat show held each year the first weekend in May at Lakewood Yacht Club. The Seabrook Festival of the Arts is held annually on the grounds of Seabrook City Hall and Community House at First Street, where artists exhibit paintings, sculpture, textiles, jewelry, wood works, photography and musical performances by Texas musicians. The festival is sponsored by the City of Seabrook in cooperation with the Art Consortium of the Texas Gulf Coast.

=== Pelican Path Project ===
The Pelican Path Project was established in March 2001 with seed money provided by the City of Seabrook's Hotel Occupancy Tax Funds and modeled after the CowParades in New York City and Chicago. The goals of the Pelican Path Project have been to attract customers to frequent local businesses, encourage walking and recreation, and to promote the local ecotourism industry, tying in to both the brown and white pelicans that gathered along the banks of the bay and surrounding waterways. Many businesses in Seabrook have purchased a pelican from Pelican Path Project and have customized it to represent their type of business, as well as the city of Seabrook.

== Parks and recreation ==
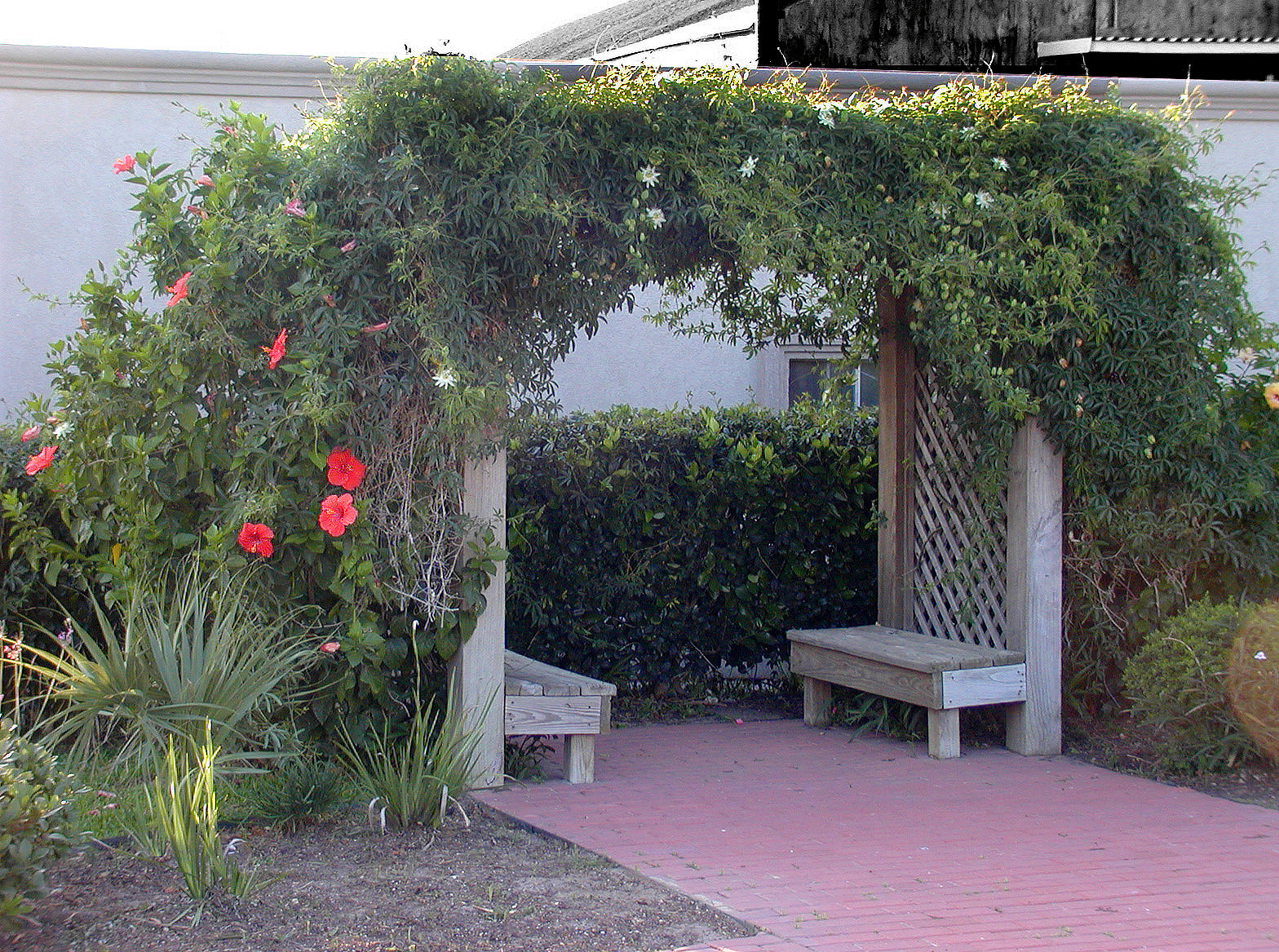
Mohrhusen Park

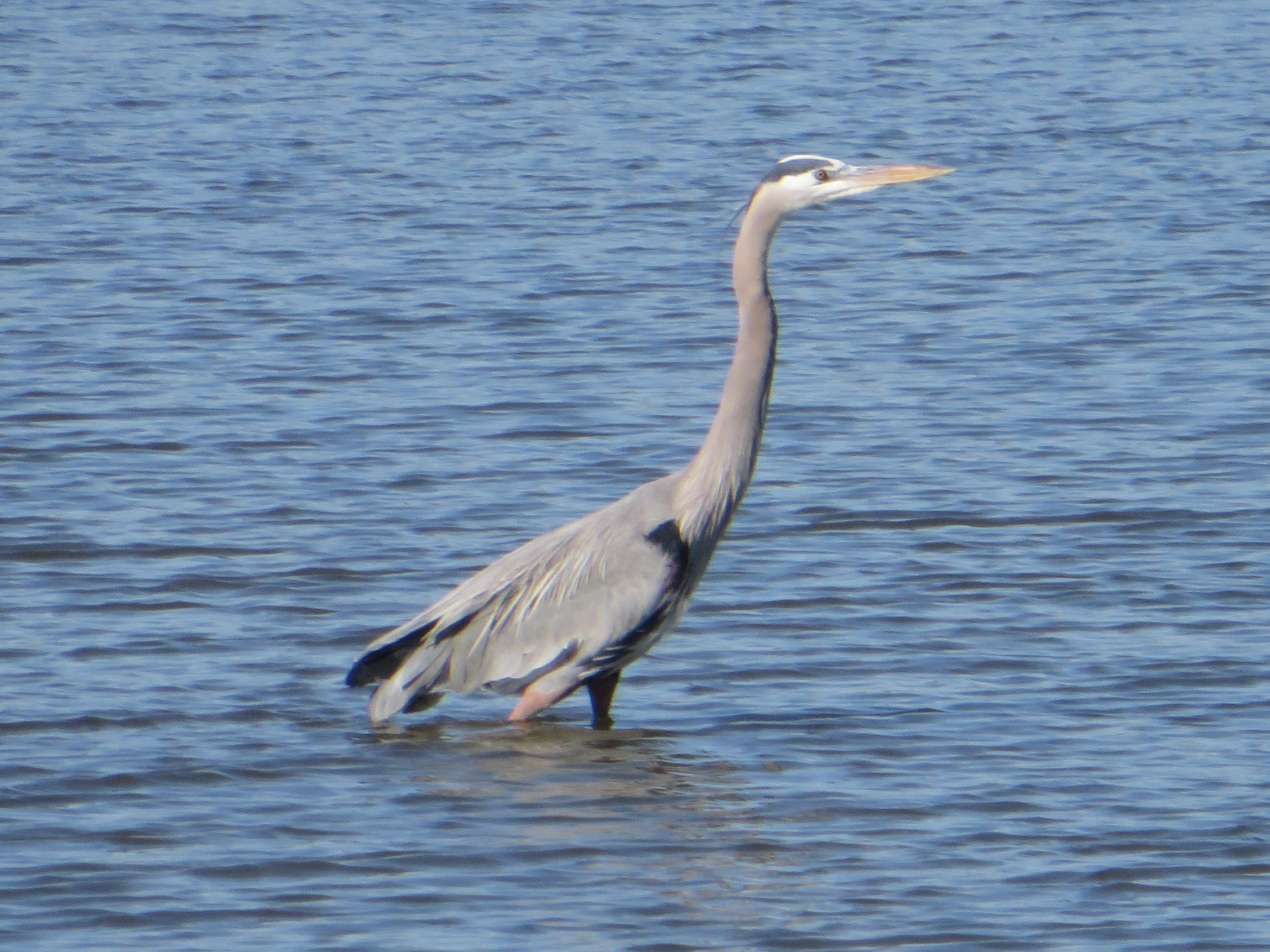
A heron on the water in Seabrook

=== Seabrook trail system ===
There are 8 miles (13 km) of continuous trails from Hammer Street to Galveston Bay at Pine Gully Park, where the Lucky Trails Marathon is run in March. The trail system was built from crushed granite, which connects most of the city's parks, including Robinson and Pine Gully Parks. The trail system traverses habitats for a wide variety of wildlife.

In addition to the city being designated as a bird sanctuary, the city includes four sites on the Great Texas Coastal Birding Trail. The only other site in the Clear Lake area on this Texas trail is the Armand Bayou Nature Center.

== Education ==
=== Primary and secondary schools ===
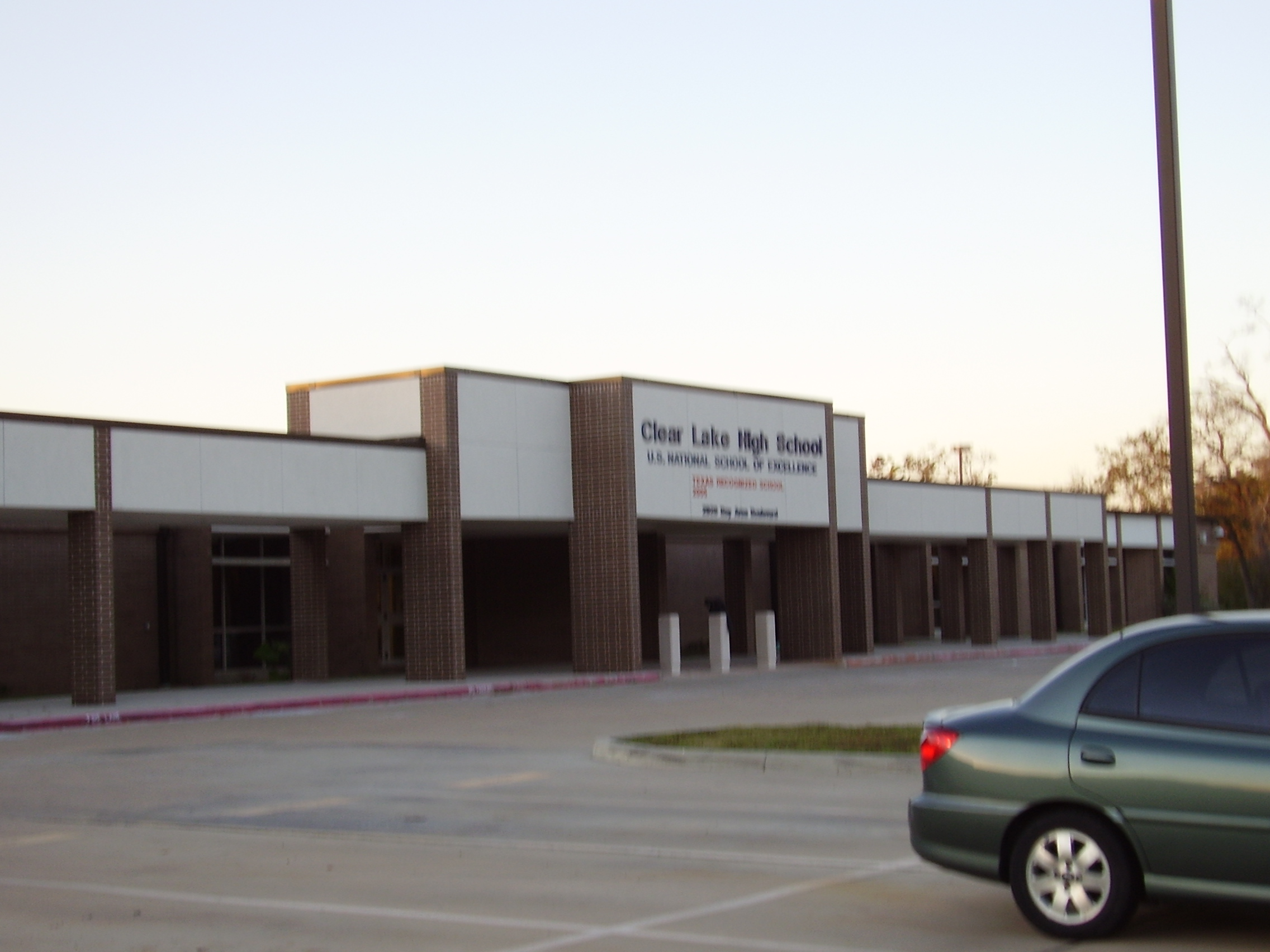
Clear Lake High School

Pupils in Seabrook attend schools in Clear Creek Independent School District. The community is within the Board of Trustees District 1, represented by Robert Allan Davee as of 2008. CCISD was established in 1948, partly from the former Seabrook school district. The former Seabrook district served up to junior high school with high schoolers going to Webster.

Most Seabrook residents are zoned to James F. Bay Elementary School, which was originally known as Seabrook Elementary but was renamed in 1969 to honor the principal who had served for many years. Some residents are zoned to Ed White Elementary School in El Lago, which was built in 1965 and was named after Ed White, the famous astronaut who died in the fire working on the Apollo mission.

All Seabrook residents are zoned to Seabrook Intermediate School (Seabrook). Seabrook Intermediate also houses the Science Magnet Program, which offers an enriched Science curriculum with many outside science activities. This program is an application-process program and the students accepted are gifted in the field of science. Seabrook Intermediate also houses the Living Materials Center, which is the home for over 60 species of animals. The Living Materials Center is available to all students in the school and throughout the district.

All Seabrook residents are zoned to Clear Falls High School in League City. Residents were previously zoned to Clear Lake High School in Clear Lake City, Houston.

=== Colleges and universities ===
The portion of Clear Creek ISD in Harris County (and therefore Seabrook) is assigned to San Jacinto College.

== Infrastructure and services ==
The Harris County Public Library Evelyn Meador Branch serves the community. The library opened on June 26, 1988. The original planning of the library started in 1985 when five Seabrook residents met Harris County Commissioner Jim Fonteno. The library suffered enough damage from Hurricane Ike that it was completely rebuilt. The new, larger library reopened on June 28, 2011.

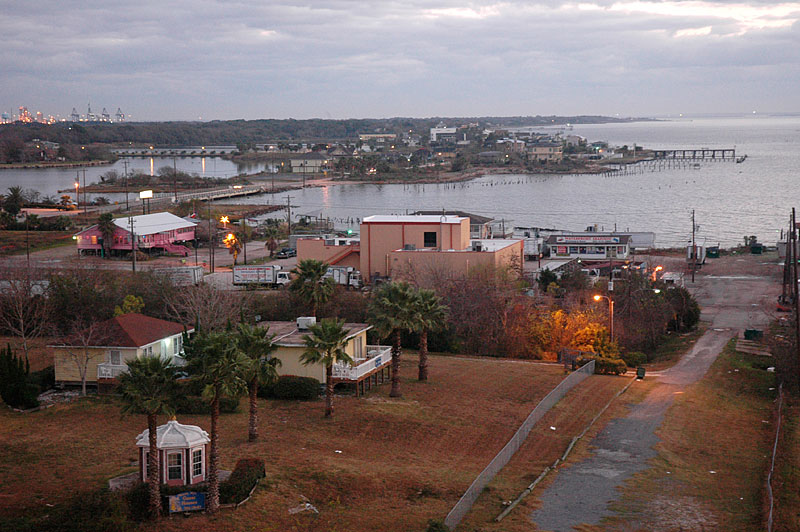
Photo of Seabrook taken from the Kemah bridge. Waterfront and fish markets in the foreground, lower Todville in the middle, Seabrook residential area in the background.

Harris County Transit previously operated public transportation in Seabrook. The Seabrook Post Office is located at 1600 Second Street.

The Seabrook Volunteer Fire Department (SVFD) provides fire protection and medical first responder services to the city. The FD operates out of two stations and also has a fire boat docked at a local boat marina. SVFD is staffed entirely by volunteer firefighters. Equipment operated by SVFD includes:

- 3 engines
- 1 tower truck
- 1 rescue truck
- 1 rehab truck
- 2 utility pick-up trucks
- 3 chief vehicles
- 1 fire boat
- 2 rescue boats

Harris County Youth Village, a juvenile detention facility, is located in Pasadena, but has a Seabrook postal address.

Harris Health System (formerly Harris County Hospital District) designated Strawberry Health Center in Pasadena for ZIP code 77586. The nearest public hospital is Ben Taub General Hospital in the Texas Medical Center.

=== Damage from Hurricane Ike ===
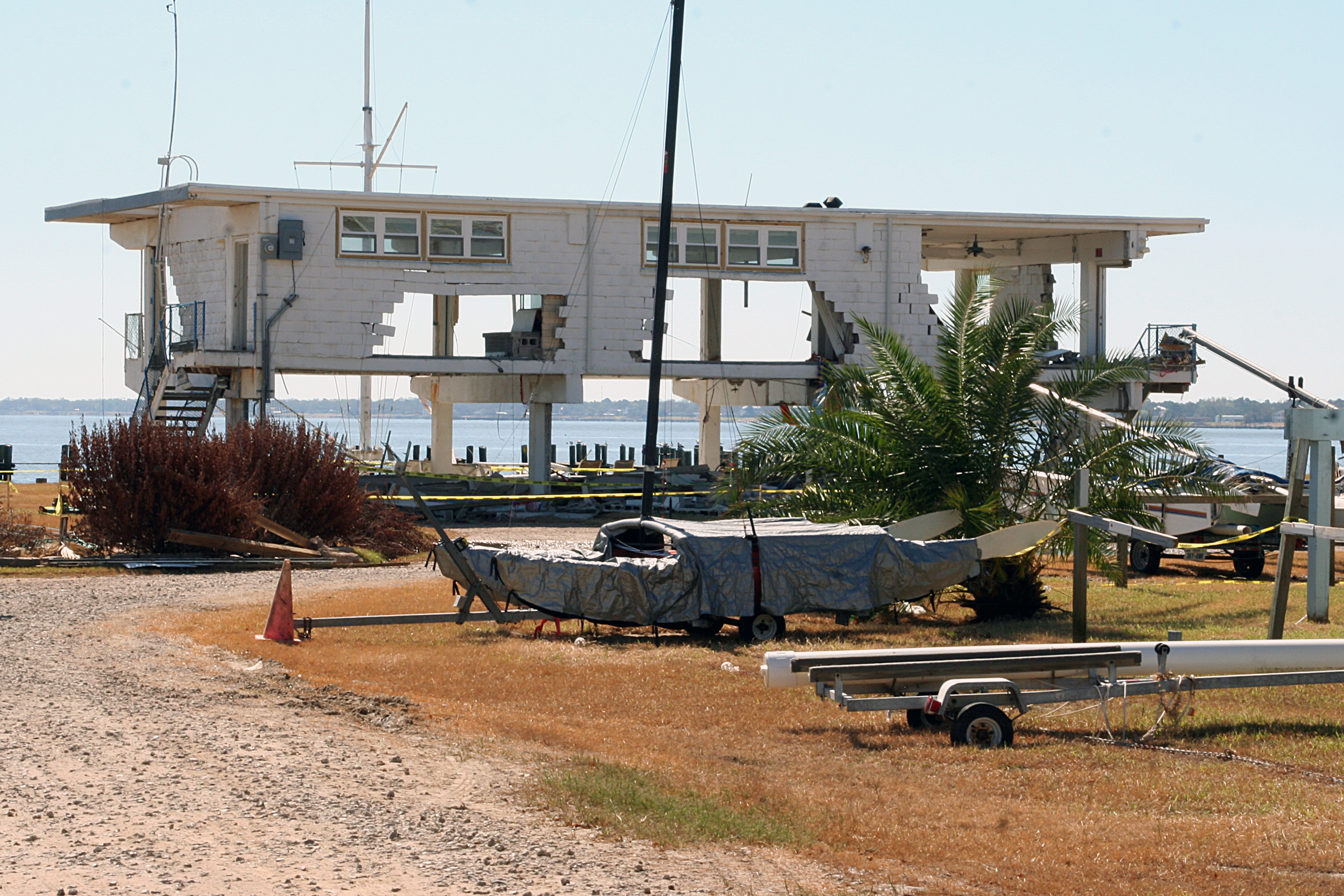
Remains of a house on Todville Road, on Galveston bay, after Hurricane Ike struck

The city of Seabrook was under mandatory evacuation for Hurricane Ike on the morning of September 13, 2008. Hurricane Ike was the 3rd most destructive hurricane to hit the United States. In Seabrook, the storm surge not only knocked out the streets as a means of transportation, but also knocked the power out for the entire city, along with many others. Because Seabrook is surrounded by water, the aftermath of debris and boats on the roads was phenomenal from all of the boat docks close to shore. Seabrook residents were left without power and running water for up to a month after Hurricane Ike made landfall.

A month after the hurricane, Seabrook was still dealing with people not being able to live in the conditions, even after the Federal Emergency Management Agency (FEMA) came. The students zoned to schools in the Clear Creek Independent School District (which are all the residents in Seabrook) missed almost three weeks of school due to the evacuation and the damage to buildings and roads in the Seabrook and surrounding areas.

== Sister cities ==
On June 19, 2002 the cities of Seabrook and Isla Santa Cruz, Ecuador finalized a sister city status during a ceremony at Seabrook City Hall. As part of the agreements the City of Seabrook planned to build a $500,000 ($733,024 adjusted for inflation c. 2022), 7,000-square-foot (650 m^{2}) Ecuador visitors' center, which was to include a museum, a multimedia cultural center, and retail shops. Ecuador stated that it had secured $450,000 of the funds as of January 1, 2004. In May 2004 the city asked for an additional $150,000 in private funding and stated that the center may not be built if it does not get this funding.

== See also ==
- List of municipalities in Texas
- Greater Houston
- Galveston Bay Area
