= Clearpath =

Clearpath may refer to:

- ClearPath Foundation a nonprofit organization
- Clearpath Robotics a manufacturer
- Clear Path Alternative School an educational institution located in Webster, Texas
- ClearPath Diagnostics, a subsidiary of Labcorp
