= Grace Christian Academy (Texas) =

Private school in Texas, United States

Coordinates: 29.579386°N 95.150756°W

Information
- School type: Private Christian school
- Established: 1993; 33 years ago
- Grades: K-12
- Enrollment: c.250 (2018)
- Website: www.gcahtx.com

Grace Christian Academy (GCA) is a private K–12 Christian school located in Clear Lake City, Houston, Texas. The independent Christian school is located on a 20-acre (81,000 m^{2}) facility, with one building and 106,000 square feet (9,800 m^{2}) of useable space, in the Pineloch neighborhood in Clear Lake City. The plot the school is built on is surrounded by outside athletic facilities.

== History ==
GCA was founded in 1993 as Grace Christian School. In 2004 Grace Community Church moved to a new location. The school bought the building and changed its name to Clear Lake Christian School. In 2005 Harvest Christian Academy closed, consolidating into CLCS, and in celebration of its 25th year is now named Grace Christian Academy. In 2006 South Shaver Baptist Christian School closed, consolidating into CLCS.

== Academics ==
GCA has a 100% graduation rate, with 97.5% of students continuing to university. Notably, GCA graduates continued their academic studies to facilities such as the University of Oxford, Harvard University, Georgetown University, Penn State University, Rice University, and Baylor University, among others.

Grace Christian Academy holds memberships the Association of Christian Schools International (ACSI), International Christian Accrediting Association (ICAA), AdvancED Worldwide, T-CAL and NCAA.

=== Extracurricular activities ===
The school has a STEM program, Student Council, Athletics, Beta Club, National Honor Society, History Club, Yearbook, Robotics, and National Elementary Honor Society.

=== Faith integration ===
Each morning opens with a school assembly and prayer. Students participate in weekly chapel services held on Thursdays. High school students are required to complete 4 credits of Bible. Elementary students begin each day with a Bible lesson.

== Demographics ==
As of 2018, GCA has over 250 students. The school has one of the most diverse populations for private schools in the area.

- 8.0% African/American
- 10.0% Hispanic
- 21.7% Asian
- 61% White
- 0.3% two or more races

== Athletics ==
GCA is associated with T-CAL and has six man football.

The varsity volleyball team competes in Division TCAL 3A. Since 2012, they have consistently ranked in the top 5 for the state of Texas, becoming state champions in 2014 and 2016.
