= Taylor Lake Village, Texas =

City in Harris County, Texas, United States

- City
- Location in Harris County and the state of Texas
- Coordinates: 29°34′27″N 95°3′19″W
- Country: United States
- State: Texas
- County: Harris

Area
  - Total: 1.31 sq mi (3.39 km^{2})
  - Land: 1.12 sq mi (2.90 km^{2})
  - Water: 0.19 sq mi (0.48 km^{2})
- Elevation: 3.3 ft (1 m)

Population (2020)
  - Total: 3,704
  - Density: 3,184.3/sq mi (1,229.47/km^{2})
- Time zone: UTC-6 (Central (CST))
  - Summer (DST): UTC-5 (CDT)
- ZIP code: 77586
- Area code: 281
- FIPS code: 48-71960
- GNIS feature ID: 1377175
- Website: www.taylorlakevillage.us

Taylor Lake Village is a city in Harris County, Texas, United States. The population was 3,704 at the 2020 U.S. census.

== Geography ==
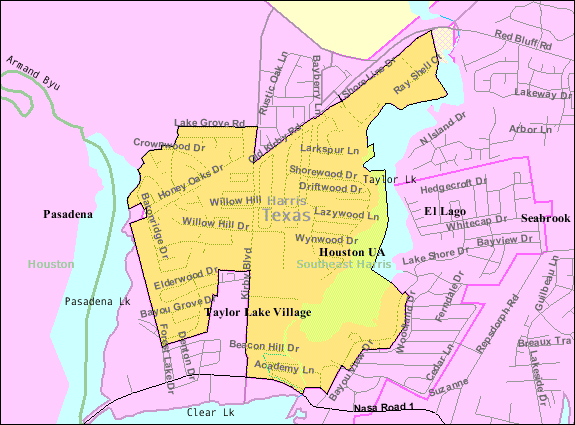
Map of Taylor Lake Village

Taylor Lake Village is located at 29°34′27″N 95°3′19″W (29.574216, –95.055327).

According to the United States Census Bureau, the city has a total area of 1.3 square miles (3.4 km^{2}), of which 1.1 square miles (2.9 km^{2}) is land and 0.19 square miles (0.5 km^{2}), or 14.10%, is water.

== Demographics ==
Historical population
| Census | Pop. | Note | %± |
|---|---|---|---|
| 1970 | 990 | | — |
| 1980 | 3,669 | | 270.6% |
| 1990 | 3,394 | | −7.5% |
| 2000 | 3,694 | | 8.8% |
| 2010 | 3,544 | | −4.1% |
| 2020 | 3,704 | | 4.5% |
U.S. Decennial Census

=== Racial and ethnic composition ===
Taylor Lake Village city, Texas – Racial and ethnic composition Note: the US Census treats Hispanic/Latino as an ethnic category. This table excludes Latinos from the racial categories and assigns them to a separate category. Hispanics/Latinos may be of any race.
| Race / Ethnicity (NH = Non-Hispanic) | Pop 2000 | Pop 2010 | Pop 2020 | % 2000 | % 2010 | % 2020 |
|---|---|---|---|---|---|---|
| White alone (NH) | 3,287 | 3,026 | 2,957 | 88.98% | 85.38% | 79.83% |
| Black or African American alone (NH) | 100 | 78 | 89 | 2.71% | 2.20% | 2.40% |
| Native American or Alaska Native alone (NH) | 14 | 5 | 14 | 0.38% | 0.14% | 0.38% |
| Asian alone (NH) | 76 | 128 | 115 | 2.06% | 3.61% | 3.10% |
| Native Hawaiian or Pacific Islander alone (NH) | 5 | 1 | 1 | 0.14% | 0.03% | 0.03% |
| Other race alone (NH) | 7 | 6 | 12 | 0.19% | 0.17% | 0.32% |
| Mixed race or Multiracial (NH) | 36 | 39 | 151 | 0.97% | 1.10% | 4.08% |
| Hispanic or Latino (any race) | 169 | 261 | 365 | 4.57% | 7.36% | 9.85% |
| Total | 3,694 | 3,544 | 3,704 | 100.00% | 100.00% | 100.00% |

=== 2020 census ===
As of the 2020 census, there were 3,704 people, 1,358 households, and 1,164 families residing in the city. The median age was 48.1 years, with 21.0% of residents under the age of 18 and 24.1% aged 65 or older. For every 100 females there were 98.9 males, and for every 100 females age 18 and over there were 96.5 males.

There were 1,358 households in Taylor Lake Village, of which 33.4% had children under the age of 18 living in them. Of all households, 71.9% were married-couple households, 9.7% were households with a male householder and no spouse or partner present, and 15.6% were households with a female householder and no spouse or partner present. About 14.5% of all households were made up of individuals and 8.6% had someone living alone who was 65 years of age or older.

There were 1,412 housing units, of which 3.8% were vacant. The homeowner vacancy rate was 0.7% and the rental vacancy rate was 4.5%.

All 3,704 residents lived in urban areas, while none lived in rural areas.

Racial composition as of the 2020 census
| Race | Number | Percent |
|---|---|---|
| White | 3,040 | 82.1% |
| Black or African American | 93 | 2.5% |
| American Indian and Alaska Native | 20 | 0.5% |
| Asian | 115 | 3.1% |
| Native Hawaiian and Other Pacific Islander | 1 | 0.0% |
| Some other race | 63 | 1.7% |
| Two or more races | 372 | 10.0% |
| Hispanic or Latino (of any race) | 365 | 9.9% |

=== 2000 census ===
At the census of 2000, there were 3,694 people, 1,341 households, and 1,177 families residing in the city. The population density was 2,974.2 inhabitants per square mile (1,148.3/km^{2}). There were 1,364 housing units at an average density of 1,098.2 per square mile (424.0/km^{2}). The racial makeup of the city was 92.39% White, 2.71% African American, 0.49% Native American, 2.06% Asian, 0.14% Pacific Islander, 1.03% from other races, and 1.19% from two or more races. Hispanic or Latino of any race were 4.57% of the population.

There were 1,341 households, out of which 36.7% had children under the age of 18 living with them, 80.8% were married couples living together, 5.1% had a female householder with no husband present, and 12.2% were non-families. 11.0% of all households were made up of individuals, and 5.1% had someone living alone who was 65 years of age or older. The average household size was 2.75 and the average family size was 2.96.

In the city, the population was spread out, with 25.6% under the age of 18, 4.3% from 18 to 24, 22.7% from 25 to 44, 34.2% from 45 to 64, and 13.2% who were 65 years of age or older. The median age was 44 years. For every 100 females, there were 97.3 males. For every 100 females age 18 and over, there were 95.2 males.

The median income for a household in the city was $99,535, and the median income for a family was $102,873. Males had a median income of $83,358 versus $48,500 for females. The per capita income for the city was $43,936. About 0.4% of families and 1.0% of the population were below the poverty line, including 1.4% of those under age 18 and 1.1% of those age 65 or over.

== Government and infrastructure ==
The Lakeview Police Department serves Taylor Lake Village and El Lago. In 1986, the two cities decided to merge their police departments. The merger was completed in January 1987. The administration is in El Lago.

Harris Health System (formerly Harris County Hospital District) designated Strawberry Health Center in Pasadena for ZIP code 77586. The nearest public hospital is Ben Taub General Hospital in the Texas Medical Center.

== Education ==
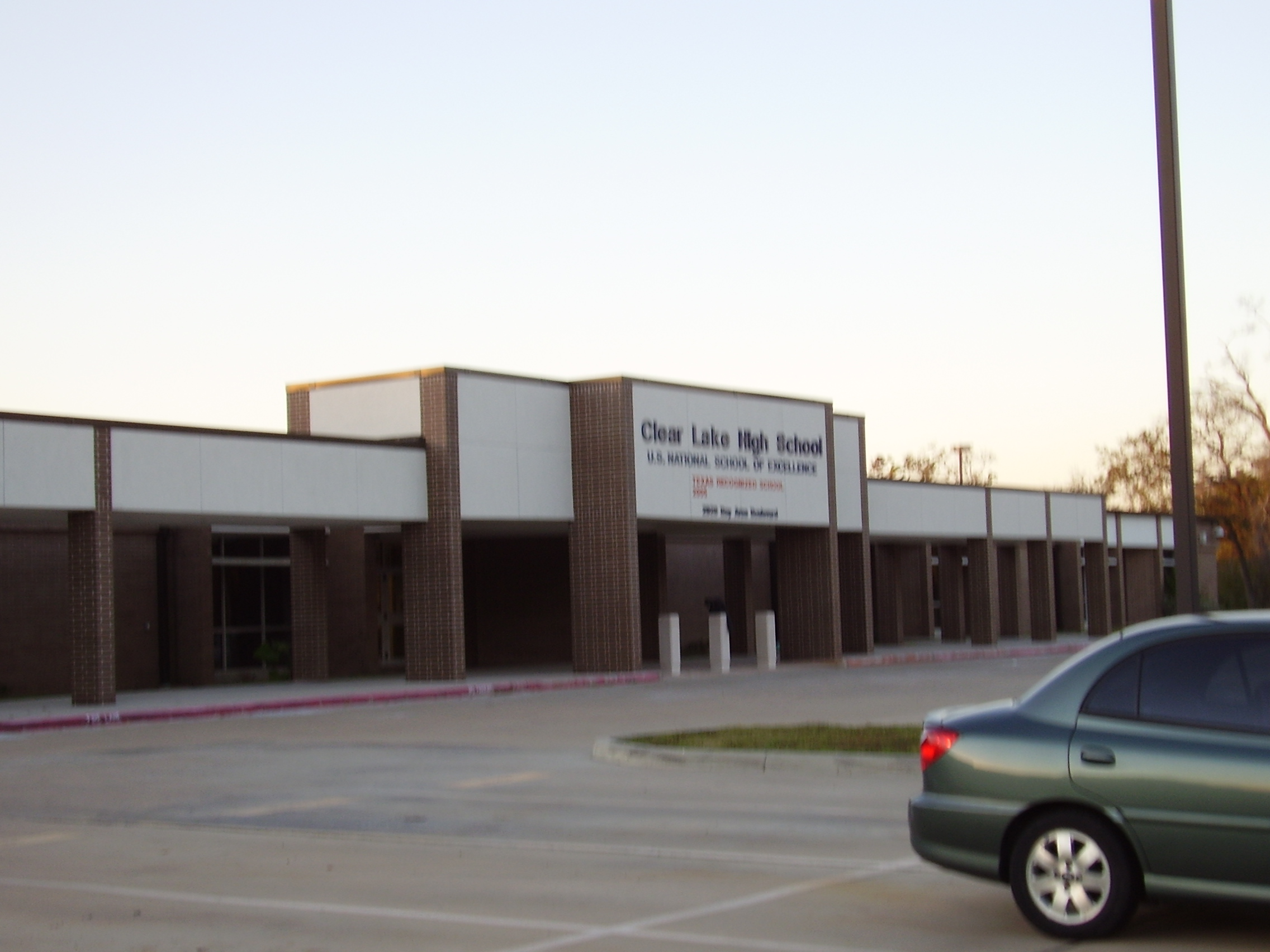
Clear Lake High School

Pupils in Taylor Lake Village attend schools in Clear Creek Independent School District. The community is within the Board of Trustees District 1, represented by Robert Allan Davee as of 2008.

Almost all of Taylor Lake Village is zoned to Robinson Elementary School in Pasadena, near Taylor Lake Village. A small portion is zoned to Ed White Elementary School in El Lago. All of the city is zoned to Seabrook Intermediate School (Seabrook), and Clear Falls High School (League City).

Residents were previously zoned to Clear Lake High School in Clear Lake City, Houston.

Prior to fall 2006, most of Taylor Lake Village was zoned to James F. Bay and Ed White Elementary.

The portion of Clear Creek ISD in Harris County (and therefore Taylor Lake Village) is assigned to San Jacinto College.

== Parks ==
Taylor Lake Village has a 40-acre (16 ha) community park, located at 500 Kirby Boulevard, behind City Hall. The park includes athletic fields, a jogging track, a fishing pier, a picnic pavilion, disc golf course, and playgrounds.

Harris County Precinct 2 operates the Bay Area Community Center at 5002 NASA Road 1 in nearby Pasadena.

== See also ==
- List of municipalities in Texas
