= Pine Gully Park, Seabrook, Texas =

Park

Pine Gully Park
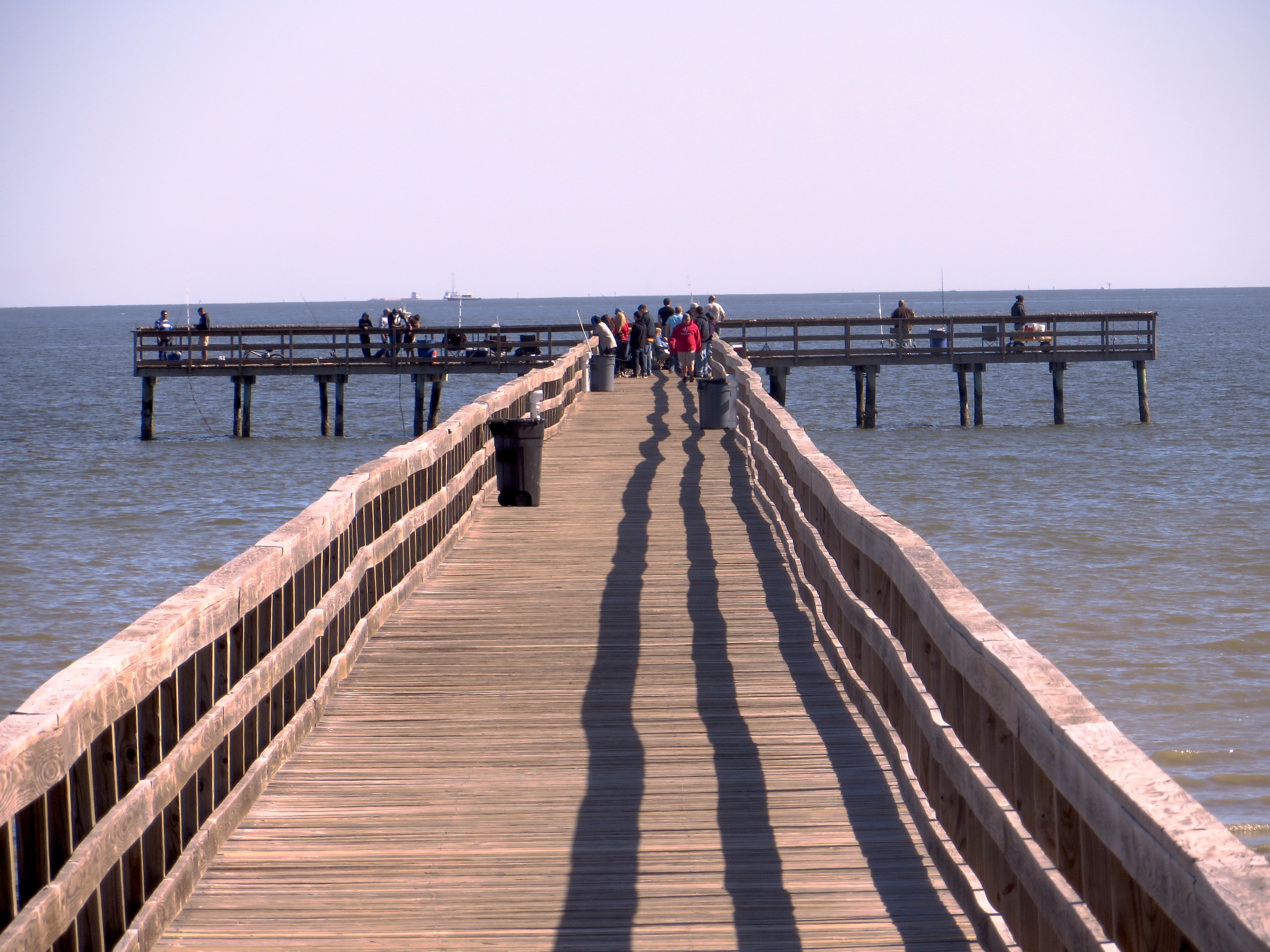
- Fishing pier at Pine Gully Park

- Location within the United States
- Location: Seabrook, Texas, United States
- Nearest city: Houston, Texas
- Coordinates: 29°34′7″N 95°1′21″W
- Governing body: City of Seabrook, Texas

Pine Gully Park is a 52-acre (21 ha) park located in Seabrook, Texas in the United States, near Houston. It is located on the shore of Galveston Bay. The park belongs to the Seabrook Trail System and includes undeveloped and restored woodlands, salt marsh and several species of wildlife.

== The park ==
Though the park has some traditional recreational facilities it also features a great deal of largely undeveloped and restored woodlands and salt marshes which offer habitats for numerous animal species.

The park is part of the Seabrook Trail System, which connects most of the parks in the city. As part of this system the park is part of a larger collection of wildlife habitats in Seabrook which are all near the much larger Armand Bayou Nature Center. The park is also part of the Great Texas Coastal Birding Trail, which includes bird watching sites, sanctuaries, and trails along the entire Texas Gulf Coast.

Park wildlife includes American alligator, heron, king rail, white-tailed deer, Mexican long-nosed armadillo, and many other species. Apart from its natural scenery, the park features a preserved Karankawa camp site.

There is a $10 entry fee (per vehicle) for non-Seabrook residents Monday-Thursday and a $20 entry fee (per vehicle) for non-Seabrook residents Friday-Sunday. Residents of the city of Seabrook receive free admission for themselves and all guests in their vehicle.

== See also ==
- Galveston Bay Area
- Greater Houston
