= Clear Path Alternative School =

Location
- 1001 Magnolia Avenue; Webster, Texas 77598; United States
- Coordinates: 29.525316°N 95.121780°W

Information
- Type: Public school
- Principal: Lori Fougerousse
- Teaching staff: 22.00 (FTE)
- Grades: 6-12
- Enrollment: 123 (2022-2023)
- Student to teacher ratio: 5.59
- Website: Official Website

Clear Path is a secondary alternative school located in Webster, Texas, in the Clear Creek Independent School District for 6th to 12th grade. At Clear Path, students are "placed" and moved to the school at administrative request for various reasons. The majority are at risk of dropping out of school. The school serves all of CCISD, including the cities of Kemah, Clear Lake Shores, Nassau Bay, Webster, League City, El Lago, and Taylor Lake Village.

Clear Path is an alternative school and does not have school team sports; however, it does offer physical education, also known as PE.

Clear Path also includes the Special Education department and Communities In School.

Communities In Schools opened a second department in Clear Springs High School in August 2007.

== Feeder patterns ==
All schools feed into Clear Path Education Center.
