= El Lago, Texas =

City in Harris County, Texas, United States

- City
- Location in Harris County and the state of Texas
- Coordinates: 29°34′20″N 95°2′37″W
- Country: United States
- State: Texas
- County: Harris

Area
  - Total: 0.71 sq mi (1.84 km^{2})
  - Land: 0.64 sq mi (1.67 km^{2})
  - Water: 0.066 sq mi (0.17 km^{2})
- Elevation: 10 ft (3.0 m)

Population (2020)
  - Total: 3,090
  - Density: 4,136/sq mi (1,596.8/km^{2})
- Time zone: UTC-6 (Central (CST))
  - Summer (DST): UTC-5 (CDT)
- ZIP code: 77586
- Area code: 281
- FIPS code: 48-23164
- GNIS feature ID: 1377176
- Website: ellago-tx.gov

El Lago is a city in Harris County, Texas, United States. The population was 3,090 at the 2020 census.

El Lago has particular historical significance, as it sits on the site of one of the main hide-outs for the French pirate and privateer Jean Lafitte.

== History ==
The city of El Lago was established in 1961 and over the years has been home to at least 47 astronauts, including Neil Armstrong, the first person to walk on the Moon; Buzz Aldrin, the lunar module pilot on the 1969 Apollo 11 mission and the second person to walk on the Moon; Jim Lovell, the command module pilot of Apollo 8 (making him one of the first three humans to fly to the Moon) and commander of the Apollo 13 mission; Story Musgrave, veteran of six Space Shuttle flights on five different orbiters; and Peggy Whitson, who in 2017 became the first female astronaut to command the International Space Station. Many houses in the neighborhood were custom built specifically for the astronauts and their families. The local elementary school is named for Ed White, who was the first American to walk in space, and there are two parks named for astronauts. There's the Neil Armstrong Park and McNair Memorial Park, named for astronaut Ronald McNair, who was killed when the Space Shuttle Challenger exploded. There is a pavilion named for Dr. Ellen Ochoa, a former astronaut and director of Johnson Space Center. In addition, the city's logo features a Space Shuttle.

== Geography ==
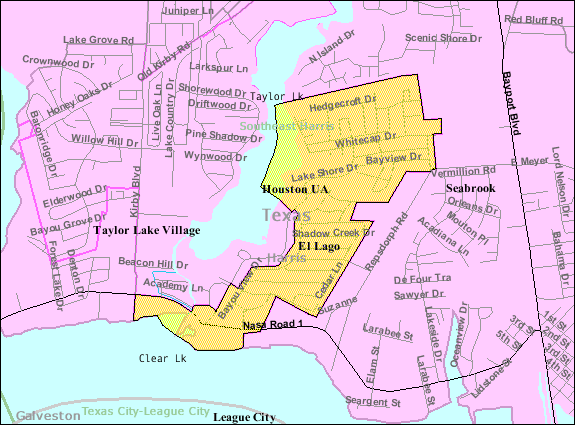
Map of El Lago

El Lago is located at 29°34′20″N 95°2′37″W (29.572147, –95.043680).

According to the United States Census Bureau, the city has a total area of 0.7 square miles (1.8 km^{2}), of which 0.6 square miles (1.6 km^{2}) is land and 0.1 square miles (0.26 km^{2}), or 8.45%, is water.

== Demographics ==
Historical population
Census	Pop.	Note	%±
1970	2,308		—
1980	3,129		35.6%
1990	3,269		4.5%
2000	3,075		−5.9%
2010	2,706		−12.0%
2020	3,090		14.2%
U.S. Decennial Census; 1850–1900 1910; 1920 1930 1940; 1950 1960 1970; 1980 1990 2000; 2010

=== Racial and ethnic composition ===
El Lago city, Texas – Racial and ethnic composition Note: the US Census treats Hispanic/Latino as an ethnic category. This table excludes Latinos from the racial categories and assigns them to a separate category. Hispanics/Latinos may be of any race.
Race / Ethnicity (NH = Non-Hispanic)	Pop 2000	Pop 2010	Pop 2020	% 2000	% 2010	% 2020
White alone (NH)	2,812	2,294	2,236	91.45%	84.77%	72.36%
Black or African American alone (NH)	24	44	73	0.78%	1.63%	2.36%
Native American or Alaska Native alone (NH)	6	5	13	0.20%	0.18%	0.42%
Asian alone (NH)	43	41	54	1.40%	1.52%	1.75%
Native Hawaiian or Pacific Islander alone (NH)	2	5	0	0.07%	0.18%	0.00%
Other race alone (NH)	1	14	29	0.03%	0.52%	0.94%
Mixed race or Multiracial (NH)	32	34	156	1.04%	1.26%	5.05%
Hispanic or Latino (any race)	155	269	529	5.04%	9.94%	17.12%
Total	3,075	2,706	3,090	100.00%	100.00%	100.00%

=== 2020 census ===
As of the 2020 census, El Lago had a population of 3,090, a median age of 42.3 years, 22.1% of residents under the age of 18, and 18.3% of residents 65 years of age or older. For every 100 females there were 92.2 males, and for every 100 females age 18 and over there were 93.8 males age 18 and over.

100.0% of residents lived in urban areas, while 0.0% lived in rural areas.

There were 1,275 households in El Lago, of which 30.5% had children under the age of 18 living in them. Of all households, 49.1% were married-couple households, 20.1% were households with a male householder and no spouse or partner present, and 24.7% were households with a female householder and no spouse or partner present. About 28.7% of all households were made up of individuals and 10.4% had someone living alone who was 65 years of age or older.

There were 1,372 housing units, of which 7.1% were vacant. The homeowner vacancy rate was 1.8% and the rental vacancy rate was 7.6%.

Racial composition as of the 2020 census
Race	Number	Percent
White	2,406	77.9%
Black or African American	83	2.7%
American Indian and Alaska Native	16	0.5%
Asian	55	1.8%
Native Hawaiian and Other Pacific Islander	0	0.0%
Some other race	167	5.4%
Two or more races	363	11.7%
Hispanic or Latino (of any race)	529	17.1%

=== 2000 census ===
As of the census of 2000, there were 3,075 people, 1,303 households, and 870 families residing in the city. The population density was 4,709.3 inhabitants per square mile (1,818.3/km^{2}). There were 1,409 housing units at an average density of 2,157.8 per square mile (833.1/km^{2}). The racial makeup of the city was 94.50% White, 0.78% African American, 0.46% Native American, 1.40% Asian, 0.07% Pacific Islander, 1.37% from other races, and 1.43% from two or more races. Hispanic or Latino of any race were 5.04% of the population.

There were 1,303 households, out of which 27.0% had children under the age of 18 living with them, 58.1% were married couples living together, 6.0% had a female householder with no husband present, and 33.2% were non-families. 27.2% of all households were made up of individuals, and 5.4% had someone living alone who was 65 years of age or older. The average household size was 2.35 and the average family size was 2.89.

In the city, the population was spread out, with 22.1% under the age of 18, 6.0% from 18 to 24, 30.3% from 25 to 44, 29.0% from 45 to 64, and 12.6% who were 65 years of age or older. The median age was 41 years. For every 100 females, there were 108.5 males. For every 100 females age 18 and over, there were 106.4 males.

The median income for a household in the city was $66,223, and the median income for a family was $90,446. Males had a median income of $66,000 versus $40,302 for females. The per capita income for the city was $33,454. About 2.2% of families and 3.0% of the population were below the poverty line, including 3.0% of those under age 18 and 1.8% of those age 65 or over.

== Government and infrastructure ==
The City of El Lago is a Type A general Municipality. Operating under a strong Mayoral form of government. The City council is composed of 5 Council Persons and a non-voting Mayor. The Mayors may vote to break a tie. Each position serves for a two-year term.

The Lakeview Police Department serves El Lago and Taylor Lake Village. In 1986 the two cities decided to merge their police departments. The merger was finished in January 1987. The administration is in El Lago.

The Seabrook Volunteer Fire Department provides fire services.

Harris Health System (formerly Harris County Hospital District) designated Strawberry Health Center in Pasadena for ZIP code 77586. The nearest public hospital is Ben Taub General Hospital in the Texas Medical Center.

== Education ==
Pupils in El Lago attend schools in Clear Creek Independent School District. The community is within the Board of Trustees District 1,

The City of El Lago has two elementary school within the city boundaries; Ed White Elementary School. Other zoned schools include Seabrook Intermediate School (Seabrook), and Clear Falls High School (League City).

Residents were previously zoned to Clear Lake High School in Clear Lake City, Houston.

Bay Area Charter Elementary School is a state charter school located in El Lago.

The portion of Clear Creek ISD in Harris County (and therefore El Lago) is assigned to San Jacinto College.

== Parks ==
Harris County Precinct 2 operates the Bay Area Community Center at 5002 NASA Road 1 in nearby Pasadena.

== See also ==
- List of municipalities in Texas
