= Clear Falls High School =

Public school in Texas, United States

Location
- 4380 Village Way; League City, Galveston County, Texas 77573; United States; 29.5091°N 95.0247°W

Information
- School type: Public high school
- Motto: "It's A Great Day to Be a Knight"
- Established: 2010
- School district: Clear Creek Independent School District
- Principal: Klayre Poa; Associate Principal: Clinton Hopper
- Staff: 142.23 (FTE)
- Grades: 9–12
- Enrollment: 2,473 (2022-2023)
- Student to teacher ratio: 17.39
- Language: English
- Colours: Green, black, and silver
- Mascot: Knight
- Nickname: Falls
- Website: Official website

Clear Falls High School is a public high school located in League City, Texas and is part of the Clear Creek Independent School District.

The school, which serves grades 9 through 12, had its first graduating class in 2013. The school opened in 2010, and is part of the Educational Village, which is also home to Mossman Elementary and Bayside Intermediate. The school provides education to portions of League City, Pasadena (El Jardin del Mar), and the Bacliff CDP and all of Seabrook, El Lago, Taylor Lake Village, Kemah, and Clear Lake Shores.

== History ==
Clear Falls High School opened in 2010 to incoming freshmen and sophomores that lived within the newly drawn boundary to incorporate the new school. The sophomores came from Clear Lake High School and Clear Creek High School, along with those from the other two high schools in Clear Creek Independent School District, Clear Brook and Clear Springs, that wished to take biotechnology. The freshmen came from several intermediate schools in the district, with parts of Victory Lakes and League City going to Falls, while all of Seabrook Intermediate is zoned there. The first graduating class was the Class of 2013.

== Campus ==
The school is the largest part of the Clear Creek Educational Village, which houses grades K-12 in one facility but in independent schools; the other schools are Mossman Elementary School and Bayside Intermediate School.

== Athletics ==
Clear Falls is a 6A school in the same district (24-6A) as the other four high schools within the Clear Creek Independent School District.

=== Sports ===
Sports teams include:

- Marching Band
- Football
- Boys and Girls Basketball
- Baseball and Softball
- Boys and Girls Track
- Boys and Girls Cross-country
- Boys and Girls Golf
- Boys and Girls Wrestling
- Swimming
- Boys and Girls Tennis
- Girls Soccer
- Boys and Girls Diving
- Boys soccer
- Debate
- Theatre
- Rifle

== Fine Arts ==
The school has a choir instructed by Jill Fetty (Knightsong Choir), an award winning theatre department directed by Traci Arceneaux, a concert/marching band directed by Brian Moreno, an orchestra taught by Timothy Rowland, and a dance team (Emeralds).

== Notable alumni ==
- Braydon Fisher, Major League Baseball pitcher for the Toronto Blue Jays
