= Clear Horizons Early College High School =

Public school in Texas, United States

Location
- 13735 Beamer Road; Houston, Harris County, Texas 77089; United States; 29.578990°N 95.204792°W

Information
- School type: Public high school / Early College High School
- Established: 2007
- School district: Clear Creek Independent School District
- Superintendent: Dr. Eric Williams
- Principal: Marshall Ponce
- Staff: 14.00 (FTE)
- Grades: 9–12
- Enrollment: 425 (2022-2023)
- Student to teacher ratio: 30.36
- Language: English
- Color
- Mascot: Coyote
- Website: chechs.ccisd.net

Clear Horizons Early College High School is a public secondary school located in Houston, Texas, United States. In this program, an associate degree is completed simultaneously within the student's four years of high school. The program requires all its students to be on either the Distinguished Achievement Plan or the Distinguished Level of Achievement Plan. Students must take the highest level classes offered for each subject (e.g. AP, PreAP, or Dual Credit classes). Dual credit classes are semi-free for the students. Acceptance into the school is based on random name drawing of applicants via lottery system based on grades.

== History ==
Clear Horizons Early College High School was founded in 2007. The school is located on the South Campus of the San Jacinto Community College District. It is the successor of Clear Creek Independent School District's Project ExCEL.

Clear Horizons' first graduating class in 2009 consisted of 12 students. Four of these graduates received their associate degree.
