= Clear Creek Independent School District =

School district in Texas, United States

Clear Creek Independent School District (CCISD)

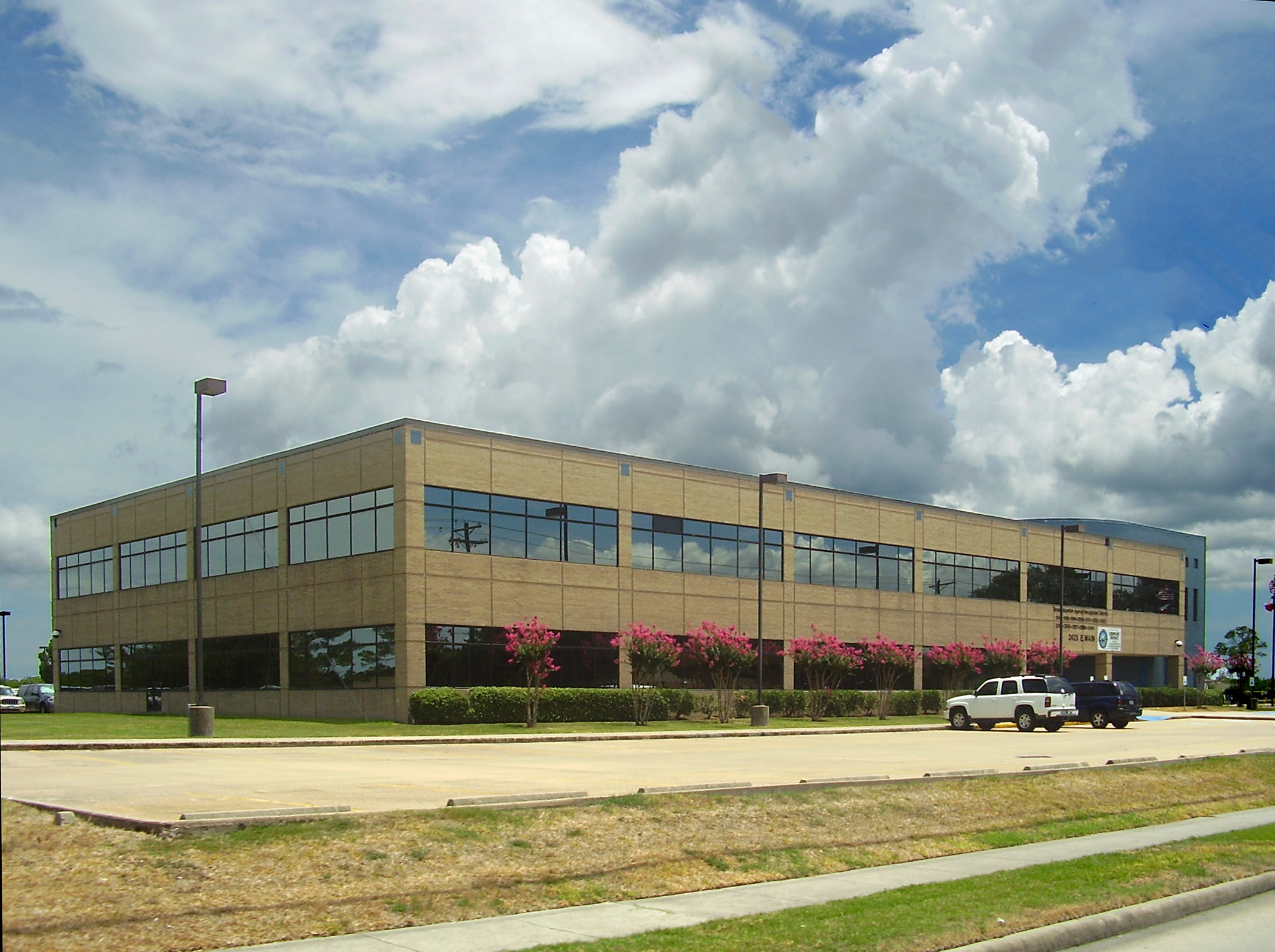
- District headquarters

Address
- 2425 East Main Street League City, Texas, 77573; United States

District information
- Type: Public
- Motto: Leading the Way in the 21st Century
- Grades: PK–12
- Established: 1948
- President: Jonathan Cotrell
- Vice-president: Jessica Cejka
- Superintendent: Karen Engle
- Deputy superintendent(s): Michael Houston
- Schools: 46
- NCES District ID: 4814280

Students and staff
- Students: 39,684 (2023–2024)
- Teachers: 2,461.36 (on an FTE basis) (2023–2024)
- Staff: 2,552.13 (on an FTE basis) (2023–2024)
- Student–teacher ratio: 16.12 (2023–2024)

Other information
- Website: Official website

Clear Creek Independent School District (CCISD) is a school district based in League City, Texas, United States. The district serves most of the Clear Lake Area and some other neighboring parts of the Houston metropolitan area. CCISD is the 29th largest school district in Texas, spanning 103 square miles and serving approximately 40,000 students. The district operates 45 schools, consisting of 7 comprehensive high schools, 1 alternative high school, 10 intermediate schools, and 27 elementary schools. The Superintendent of Schools is Karen Engle.

Clear Creek ISD currently operates two football stadiums, Veterans Memorial Stadium and Challenger Columbia Stadium, both of which serve all five of the district's 6A high schools.

== History ==
Clear Creek ISD was formed in 1948 when the districts of Kemah, League City, Seabrook, and Webster were consolidated, deriving its name from nearby Clear Creek, which forms Clear Lake, one of the few natural lakes in Texas. CCISD continued operating Webster High School until Clear Creek High School opened in 1956. The district opened Clear Lake High School in 1972, Clear Brook High School in 1988, Clear Springs High School in 2008, and Clear Falls High School in 2010.

In the 2000s, rising real estate costs in Galveston forced many families to move to other areas, including League City. This meant an influx of children out of Galveston ISD and into other school districts like Clear Creek ISD.

On May 11, 2013 the district was successful in a vote securing $367 million to "...rebuild or improve 40+ year old schools; address student safety, security systems, repairs and enrollment growth; construct or expand co-curricular and extracurricular facilities for growth in programs; and improve wireless infrastructure and access to technology for 21st century learning."

On May 6, 2017 the district was successful in a vote to approve a bond with largely the same purpose stated in 2013 "...to build new or rebuild schools, replace portables with permanent additions, renovate aging schools to bring them up to today’s learning standards, improve school and bus safety through the purchase of surveillance equipment and buses." This second bond in 2017 for $487 million resulted in a 4-year total of US$854 million of funding over and above that allocated by the state for this purpose.

CCISD is the 29th largest school district in Texas. The total enrollment for the district is currently 42,008 students. According to the last CCISD reported actual financials (2024-25), the annual per student cost is over $12,000.

Karen Engle has served as Superintendent of Schools for the Clear Creek Independent School District since December 2022, after being appointed by the CCISD Board of Trustees following her tenure as interim superintendent. A graduate of CCISD, she has spent more than 25 years in public education, serving in a variety of leadership roles including teacher, campus administrator, principal, and district administrator before becoming superintendent. Under her leadership, CCISD has continued its focus on academic excellence, student achievement, leadership development, and community engagement. In 2024, the Texas PTA recognized Engle as its Superintendent of the year. She earned a bachelor's degree from Baylor University, a master's degree from the University of Houston-Clear Lake, and a doctorate from Bethel University.

== Clear Creek ISD cities ==
CCISD includes sections of Galveston County and Harris County.

CCISD serves the following municipalities in their entirety:

- Clear Lake Shores
- El Lago
- Kemah
- Nassau Bay
- Seabrook
- Taylor Lake Village
- Webster

CCISD serves portions of the following municipalities:

- Friendswood (Harris County portion)
- Houston (Clear Lake City)
- League City (Most of League City is within CCISD)
- Pasadena (includes El Jardin del Mar)
- Pearland

In addition, some unincorporated sections of Harris County and Galveston County (including a portion of Bacliff) are zoned to CCISD.

== Schools ==
=== High schools ===
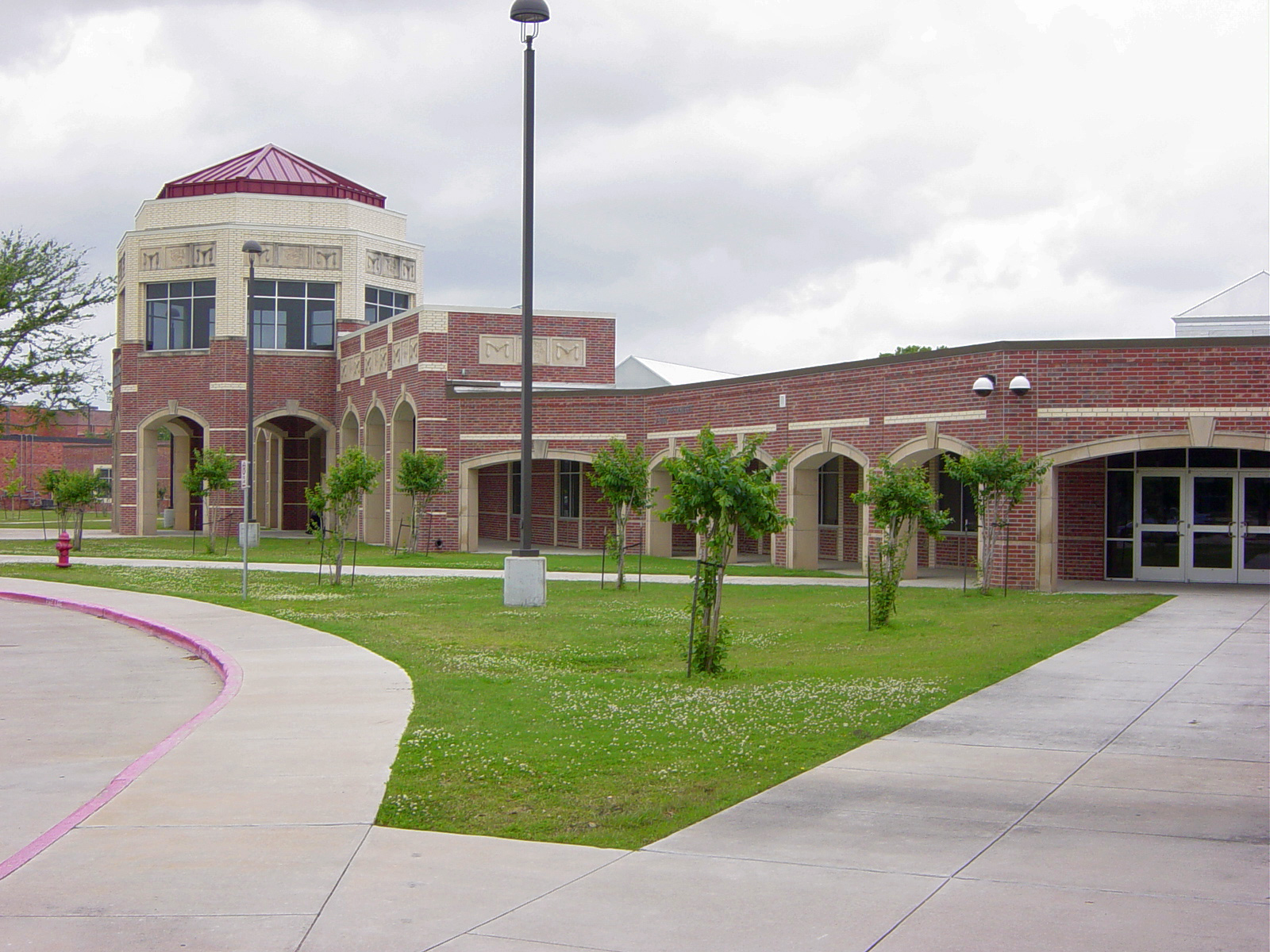
Clear Creek High School

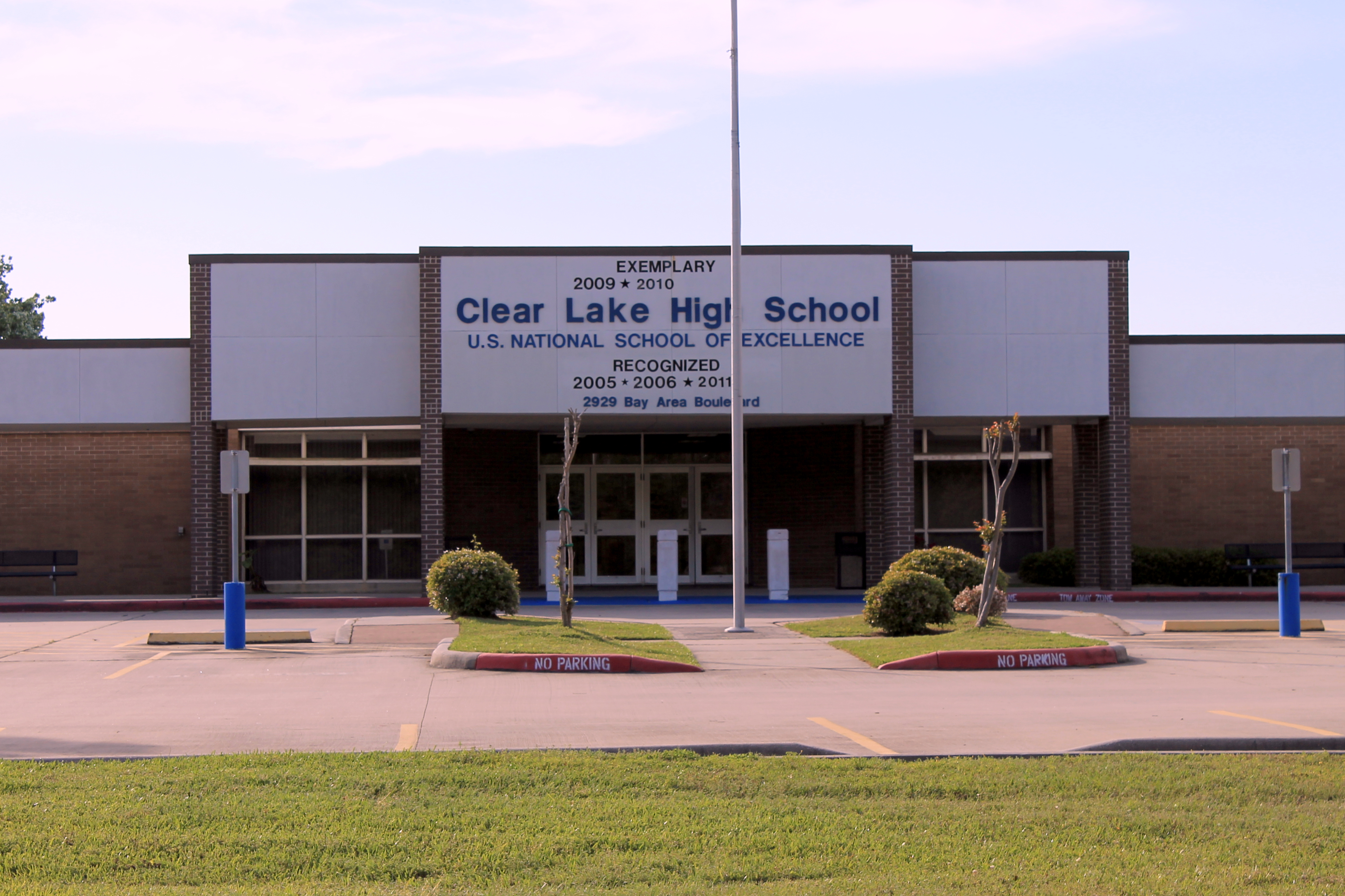
Clear Lake High School

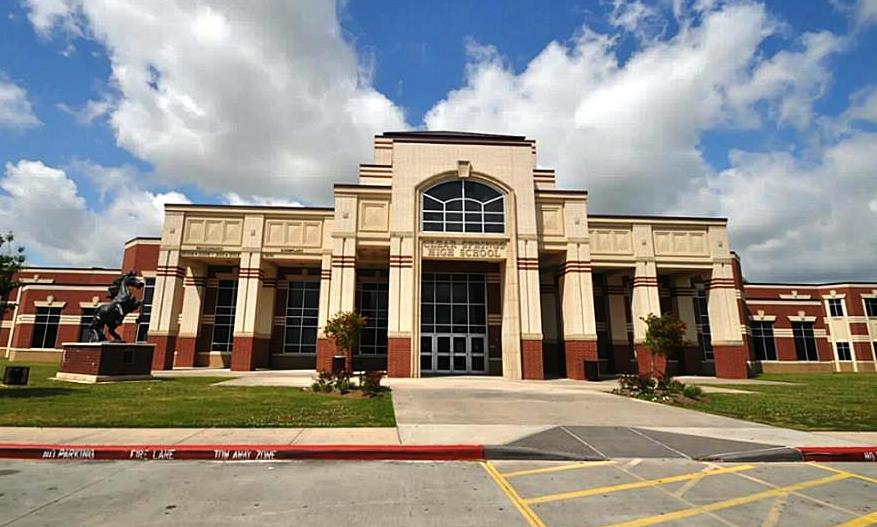
Clear Springs High School

- Clear Brook High School (Unincorporated Harris County)
- Clear Creek High School (League City)
- Clear Falls High School (League City) (Education Village)
- Clear Horizons Early College High School (Houston)
- Clear Lake High School (Houston)
  - 1987 National Blue Ribbon School
- Clear Springs High School (League City)
- Clear View High School (Webster)

=== Alternative schools ===
- Clear Path Alternative School (Webster)

=== Intermediate schools ===
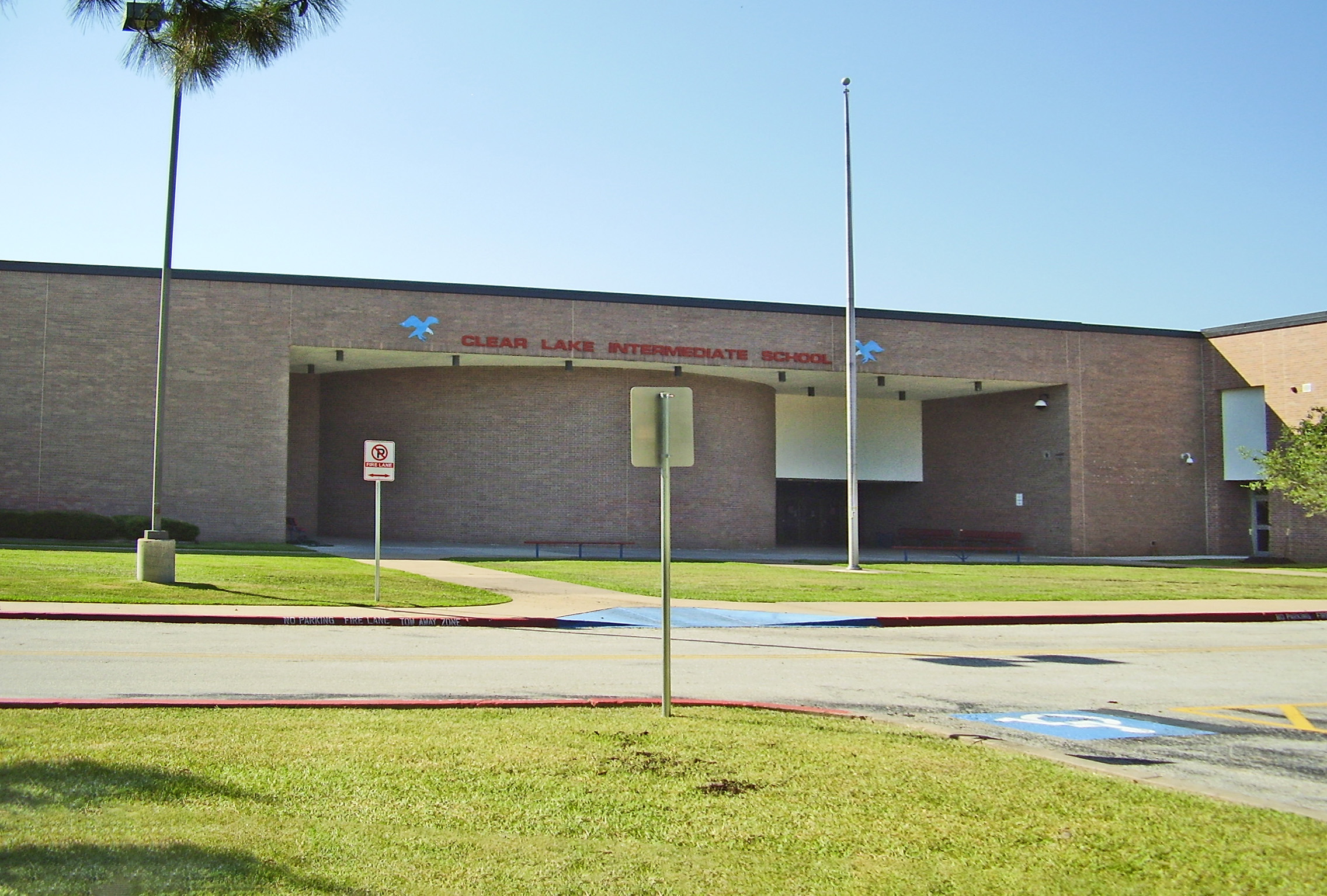
Clear Lake Intermediate School

- Bayside Intermediate School (League City) (Education Village)
- Brookside Intermediate School (Friendswood)
- Clear Creek Intermediate (League City)
- Clear Lake Intermediate School (Houston)
  - 1987 National Blue Ribbon School
- Creekside Intermediate School (League City)
- League City Intermediate School (League City)
- Seabrook Intermediate School (Seabrook)
- Space Center Intermediate School (Houston)
- Victory Lakes Intermediate School (League City)
- Westbrook Intermediate School (Friendswood)

=== Elementary schools ===
- Arlyne and Alan Weber Elementary School (Unincorporated Harris County)
- Armand Bayou Elementary School (Houston)
- Art And Pat Goforth Elementary School (League City)
- Brookwood Elementary School (Pasadena)
- C. D, Landolt Elementary School (Unincorporated Harris County)
- Clear Lake City Elementary School (Houston)
- Darwin L. Gilmore Elementary School (League City)
- Ed White E-STEM Magnet School (El Lago)
- Falcon Pass Elementary School (Houston)
- Florence Campbell Elementary School (League City)
- G. H. Whitcomb Elementary School (Houston)
- G. W. Robinson Elementary School (Pasadena)
- Henry Bauerschlag Elementary School (League City)
- I. W. and Eleanor Hyde Elementary School (League City)
- James F. Bay Elementary School (Seabrook)
  - 2014 National Blue Ribbon School
- James H. Ross Elementary School (League City)
- John F. Ward Elementary School (Houston)
- LaVace Stewart Elementary School (Unincorporated Galveston County)
  - 2007 National Blue Ribbon School
  - 2014 National Blue Ribbon School
- League City Elementary School (League City)
- Lloyd R. Ferguson Elementary School (League City)
- Margaret S. McWhirter Elementary School (Webster)
- North Pointe Elementary School (Houston)
- P. H. Greene Elementary School (Unincorporated Harris County)
- Ralph Parr Elementary School (League City)
- Sandra Mossman Elementary School (League City) (Education Village)*Walter Hall E-STEM Magnet School (League City)
- Wedgewood Elementary School (Friendswood)

== Rankings ==
As of 2010, Clear Creek ISD was ranked as an "exemplary" district (the highest ranking) by the Texas Education Agency. For comparison, 29% of all schools in Texas rated by the TEA were ranked as "exemplary".

Among the high schools, Clear Horizons Early College High School and Clear Lake High School (both in the Clear Lake City area of Houston) were ranked as "exemplary" with the others ranked as "recognized". On the Texas Assessment of Knowledge and Skills examinations, 97% of students passed in reading, 97% passed in writing, 98% passed in social studies, 93% passed in mathematics, and 92% passed in science. As of 2008 the high school graduation rate was 97%.

== See also ==
- List of school districts in Texas
