= Clear Lake High School (Texas) =

Public school in Houston, Texas

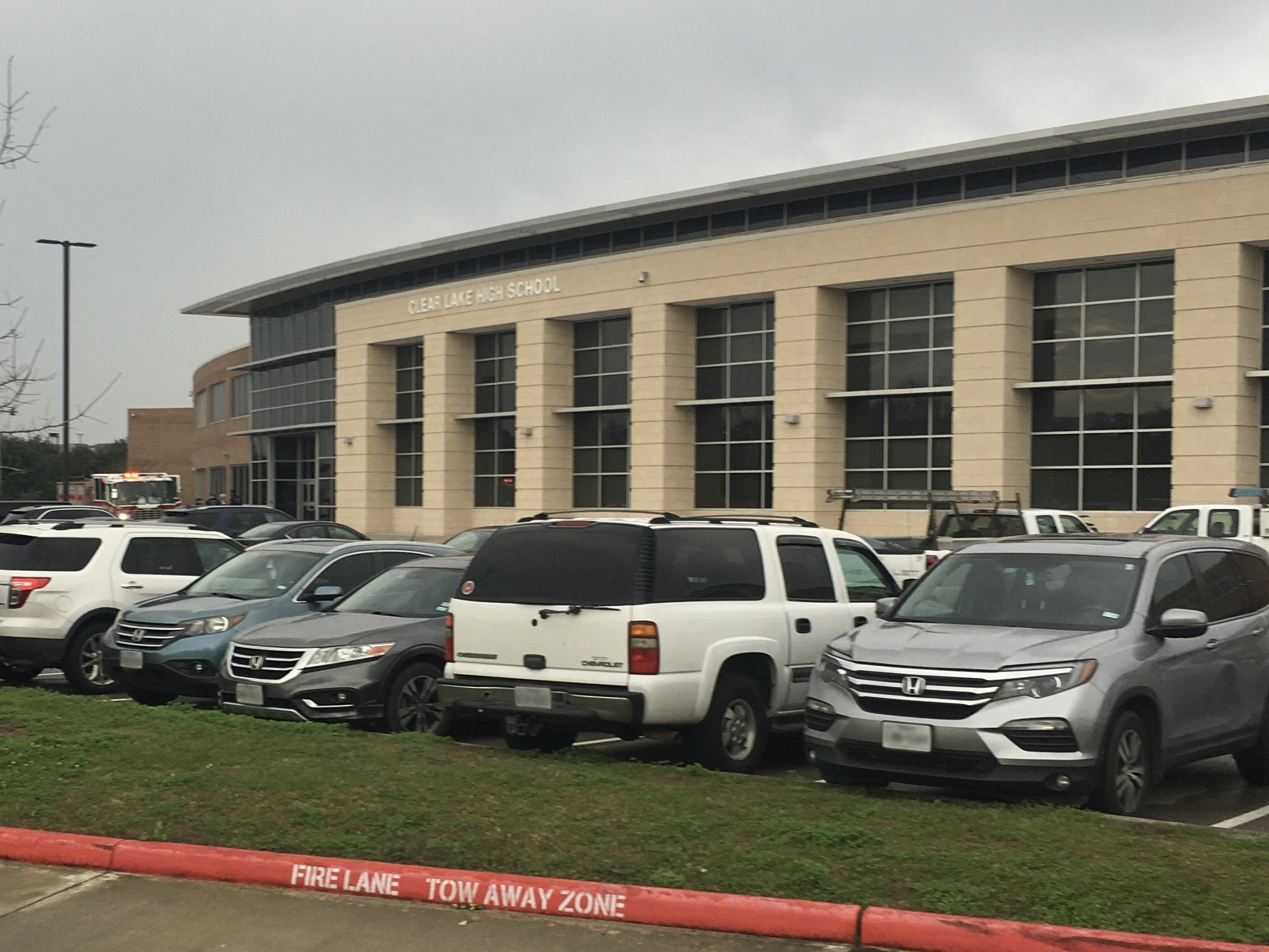

Location
- 2929 Bay Area Boulevard; Houston, Texas 77058; United States; 29°34′56″N 95°06′20″W

Information
- School type: Public high school
- Motto: Life is Better at the Lake
- Established: 1972
- School district: Clear Creek Independent School District
- Principal: Elizabeth Raska
- Teaching staff: 142.19 (FTE)
- Grades: 9–12
- Enrollment: 2,500 (2023–24)
- Student to teacher ratio: 17.58
- Colors: Red and blue
- Nickname: Falcons
- Newspaper: Lake Reflections
- Yearbook: Talon
- Website: clearlakehs.ccisd.net

Clear Lake High School is a public secondary school located in Houston, Texas, United States.

The school, which serves grades 9 through 12, is a part of the Clear Creek Independent School District. The school serves portions of Houston (including most of Clear Lake City, Taylor Lake Village and Pasadena (including Clear Lake City). It previously served the cities of Seabrook, El Lago, and the El Jardin del Mar portion of Pasadena, until Clear Falls High School in League City opened. Its colors are red, blue, and white. Its mascot and symbol is the Falcon.

== History ==
Clear Lake High School opened in 1972 to alleviate overcrowding at what was then the district's only high school, Clear Creek High School with the first class graduating in 1973. The current campus has a field house, and athletic fields, all across the street from the University of Houston–Clear Lake.

The ninth grade annex was first added to the Clear Lake High School campus in 1978. Later, the 9th grade center was used as Space Center Intermediate School but returned to a 9th grade center when SCIS moved to a newly built campus for the 1999–2000 school year. When Clear Lake was rebuilt the district began to use the ninth grade annex has a building for Robotics, the Gifted and Talented Program and more.

In 1984 psychologists enacted anti-suicide seminars at Clear Lake HS after a wave of suicides of students in CCISD, which took place outside of school campuses.

For the 1986–87 school year Clear Lake High School became a National Blue Ribbon School. Clear Lake High School is currently the largest school in Texas with a Texas Education Agency (TEA) ranking of Recognized.

The school discovered large-scale cheating in an English IV final examination in 2012. The school invalidated all English IV final exam results, allowing students who did not cheat to have a final grade without the final or to take the final again. The students who cheated received scores of zero.

=== Suicides in 1984 ===
In the 1980s, the high school was perhaps most known for the suicides that occurred in 1984. Six teenagers committed suicide, with five of them doing so in the community of Clear Lake, and with the final one being a Clear Creek High School student.

Loren Coleman, author of The Copycat Effect: How the Media and Popular Culture Trigger the Mayhem in Tomorrow's Headlines, wrote that "Needless to say, the community was alarmed by the deaths and feared more." The New York Times reported that there were rumors of a suicide pact that included up to thirty students but that this story turned out to be "a lark." Psychologists were sent to the school to deal with any residual stress that resulted from these events. In January 1985 area police department stated that since October 1984 there had been no suicides of teenagers. In 1985, Scott Lally, a 17-year-old fourth year student who worked for the school newspaper, stated "It's funny but you really don't hear the suicides talked about that much any more. But the kids who are having trouble now have a place to go."

B. Comstock, the author of "Youth Suicide Cluster: A Community Response" in Newslink, argued that the "wide press coverage" and the "abundance of volunteers eager to help but not organized to do anything" were problematic. He stated that there was a lot of panic and confusion in the Clear Lake community and that the residents of the area were not happy with the media presence.

== Demographics ==
The demographic breakdown of the 2,396 students enrolled in 2015–16 was:

- Male - 52.0%
- Female - 48.0%
- Native American/Alaskan - 0.3%
- Asian/Pacific islanders - 15.4%
- Black - 6.6%
- Hispanic - 23.8%
- White - 49.7%
- Multiracial - 4.2%

19.9% of the students were eligible for free or reduced-cost lunch.

== Campus ==
In May 2013, voters in CCISD approved a $367 million district bond. According to the referendum, Clear Lake High will get new campus buildings, valued at $98.6 million total. PBK Architects designed the new additions, a two-story classroom building and a fine arts center. Construction was scheduled to begin in April 2014.

Construction was finished in January 2018 and the constructed building is still used by Clear Lake High School now as their primary building.

A soccer ball carried aboard the fatal final flight of Space Shuttle Challenger by astronaut Ellison Onizuka, whose children attended Clear Lake High School and who coached the soccer team, is displayed in the school.

== Extracurricular activities ==
In 2005, the school had 525 students enrolled in its music classes. That year, the school was named a Grammy Signature School. Its music department received a grant for $2,000.

== Notable alumni ==
- Jidon Adams, YouTuber and streamer.
- Alex Arlitt, professional soccer player
- Kelly Frye, Actress
- Dan Heath, author
- Dustin Hopkins, NFL placekicker
- Julian Humphrey, college football cornerback
- Kimmi Kappenberg, Contestant on Survivor: The Australian Outback and Survivor: Cambodia
- Kevin Kwan, novelist
- Like Monroe, metalcore band
- Daniel Lue, Contestant on Survivor: The Amazon
- Timothy McAllister, classical saxophonist
- Seth McKinney, NFL football player
- Steve McKinney, NFL football player
- Josh McNary, NFL football player
- Jeff Novak, NFL football player
- Pete Olson, U.S. Congressman
- Christine Paolilla, perpetrator of the Clear Lake Murders.
- Scott Sheldon, Major League Baseball baseball player
- Anuraag Singhal, United States District Judge
- Suhas Subramanyam, U.S. Congressman
- Mike Swick, UFC fighter
- Jon Switzer, MLB baseball player
- Heidi Van Horne, actress, pinup model and author
- Craig Veasey, NFL football player
- Brandon Waddell, MLB pitcher
- Jared Woodfill, Houston attorney and Harris County Republican chairman
