= Clear Springs High School =

Coordinates: 29.4994°N 95.1425°W

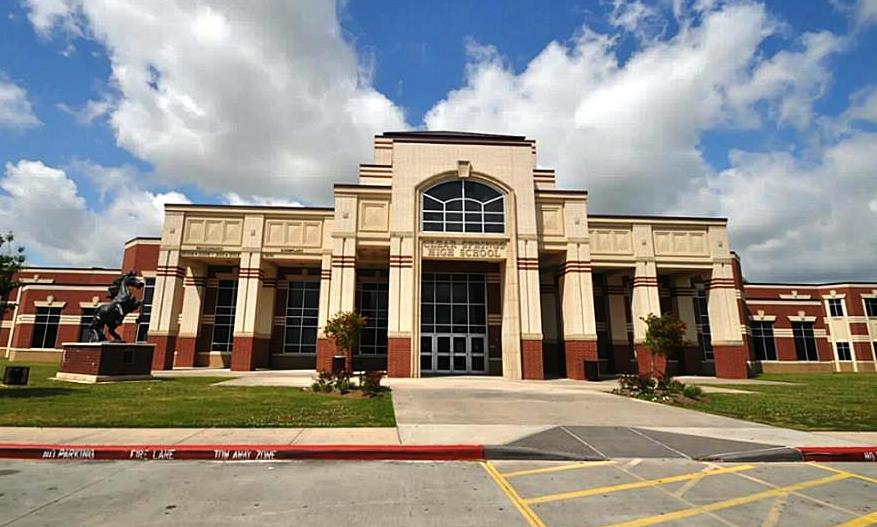

Location
- 501 Palomino Lane; League City, Texas 77573; United States

Information
- Type: Public High School
- Established: 2007
- School district: Clear Creek Independent School District
- Superintendent: Karen Engle
- CEEB code: 444-082
- Principal: Erin Schmidt
- Teaching staff: 153.11 (on an FTE basis)
- Grades: 9–12
- Enrollment: 2,668 (2024–25)
- Student to teacher ratio: 17.43
- Language: English
- Colours: Blue, Black, Silver
- Song: Clear Springs Alma Mater
- Athletics conference: UIL Region III District 24-6A
- Sports: Football; Wrestling; Softball; Soccer; Basketball; Baseball; Volleyball; Cross Country; Water Polo; Tennis; Golf
- Mascot: "Lightning"
- Team name: Chargers
- Accreditations: Texas Education Agency accountability ratings system
- Yearbook: The Frontline
- Communities served: League City; Friendswood
- Website: School Website

Clear Springs High School (CSHS) is an American public high school located in League City, Texas. It is one of seven high schools in the Clear Creek Independent School District (CCISD). The school opened in 2007 serving most of League City west of Interstate 45 and part of the Harris County portion of Friendswood.

== History ==
The construction of Clear Springs High School was approved by voters in the Clear Creek Independent School District during a 2004 bond election at a cost of $65,257,412.

Clear Springs High School opened for the 2007–2008 school year taking its zoning from areas previously served by Clear Creek High School and Clear Brook High School. In its initial year, Clear Springs was attended only by ninth and tenth graders, adding an additional grade level each year. The first graduating class was the Class of 2010.

== Demographics ==
As of the 2024–2025 school year, the demographic breakdown of the 2,668 students enrolled was as follows:

- White – 52.3%
- Hispanic – 27.5%
- Asian – 8.7%
- Black – 6.2%
- Two or More Races – 5.0%
- American Indian/Alaska Native – 0.2%
- Native Hawaiian/Pacific Islander – 0.1%

== Academics ==
In 2022, U.S. News & World Report ranked the school #240 in Texas and #2602 nationally based on college readiness and state exam scores.

They have an award-winning computer science program with multiple appearances in Region UIL.

== Fine arts ==
=== Musical theatre ===
Clear Springs produces a full-length musical every year which is entered into the Tommy Tune Awards. The show is produced and operated across the Choir, Theatre, and Technical Theatre departments.

=== Band ===
There are three concert ensembles: the Wind Ensemble, Symphonic Band, and Concert Band. In the fall, there is a competitive marching band and color guard. The Wind Ensemble has twice been recognized by the national Mark of Excellence Award by the National Wind Band Honors project.

=== Orchestra ===
The Charger Orchestra is a full symphonic orchestra, in collaboration with the Charger Band Program as of the academic year of 2012-2013. There are four String groups: Chamber I, Chamber II, Symphony, and Philharmonic. For the last several years, the orchestra has received top honors with all of its groups in UIL evaluation.

== Extracurricular activities ==
=== Honor societies ===
- National Honor Society (NHS)
- Rho Kappa (Social Studies)
- National English Honor Society (NEHS)
- Mu Alpha Theta (Mathematics)
- Science National Honor Society (SNHS)
- Sociedad Honoraria Hispánica (Spanish)
- Société Honoraire de Français (French)
- National Technical Honor Society (NTHS)
- American Sign Language Honor Society (ASLHS)
- International Thespian Society

=== Clubs ===
- HOSA
- DECA
- Student United Way
- The Morning Show
- Interact Club
- Army JROTC
- FFA
- Bolt Bots
- Gaming Club
- Computer Science Club
- Speech and Debate Club
- Technology Student Association (TSA)

== Feeder patterns ==
Clear Springs High School's approved attendance boundaries have been in effect since fall 2007.

=== Elementary schools ===
- Bauerschlag
- Campbell
- Gilmore
- Hall
- League City
- Ross
- Greene (partial)
- Landolt (partial)

=== Intermediate schools ===
- Creekside
- Brookside (Science Magnet Program, partial)
- Victory Lakes (partial)
- League City (WAVE program)
- Seabrook (Science Magnet program)

In-District Transfers: Students living within the Clear Creek Independent School District zoning boundaries, but not within the Clear Springs High School zoning boundaries, can apply for an In-District Transfer to be able to attend Clear Springs High School. Transfers must be approved by District Officials and may be granted for the following reasons:

- Transportation Conflicts
- Culinary Arts Program
- Engineering Program
- Sports
- Dance/ Drill Team
- Band and Other Fine Arts

Transfers will be granted based on the individual student and can be revoked if the student presents a problem to their new campus.

== Notable alumni ==
=== Sports ===
- Marcus Johnson: wide receiver for the Philadelphia Eagles when they won Super Bowl LII (2018). He previously played college football for the University of Texas at Austin.
- Kelly Maxwell: AUSL and college softball player
- Brooke McCarty-Williams: professional basketball player for the Dallas Wings of the Women's National Basketball Association.
- Noah Thomas: NFL wide receiver for the Cincinnati Bengals
- Marcus Williams: basketball player in the Israeli Basketball Premier League

== See also ==
- Clear Creek Independent School District
- League City, Texas
