= List of bays of the United States =

This is a list of bays in the United States.

See also Category:Bays of the United States

== Alabama ==
- Bon Secour Bay
- Mobile Bay
- Perdido Bay

== Alaska ==
- Bristol Bay
- Bucareli Bay
- Disenchantment Bay
- Eschscholtz Bay
- Funter Bay
- Glacier Bay
- Goodhope Bay
- Hazen Bay
- Holtz Bay
- Kachemak Bay
- Kamishak Bay
- Kuskokwim Bay
- Kvichak Bay
- LeConte Bay
- Lituya Bay
- Massacre Bay
- Naukati Bay
- Nushagak Bay
- Orca Bay
- Pavlof Bay
- Peard Bay
- Petrof Bay
- Resurrection Bay
- Sarana Bay
- Thomas Bay
- Ugashik Bay
- Unimak Bay
- Yakutat Bay

== California ==
- Alamitos Bay
- Bodega Bay
- Bolinas Bay
- Drakes Bay
- Estero Bay
- Grizzly Bay
- Half Moon Bay
- Humboldt Bay
- Monterey Bay
- Morro Bay
- Richardson Bay
- San Diego Bay
- San Francisco Bay
- San Leandro Bay
- San Pablo Bay
- San Rafael Bay
- Santa Monica Bay
- South Bay
- Suisun Bay
- Tomales Bay

== Delaware ==
- Delaware Bay
- Rehoboth Bay
- Indian River Bay
- Little Assawoman Bay
- Assawoman Bay

== Florida ==
- Apalachee Bay
- Apalachicola Bay
- Biscayne Bay
- Boca Ciega Bay
- Choctawhatchee Bay
- East Bay
- Escambia Bay
- Estero Bay
- Florida Bay
- Palm Bay (Florida)
- Pensacola Bay
- Ponce de Leon Bay
- San Carlos Bay
- Sarasota Bay
- St. Andrews Bay (Florida)
- St. Joseph Bay
- Tampa Bay
- Whitewater Bay

== Georgia ==
- Grand Bay

== Hawaii ==
- Anaehoomalu Bay
- Hanalei Bay
- Hanauma Bay
- Hilo Bay
- Kāneʻohe Bay
- Kaunaoa Bay
- Kealakekua Bay
- La'aloa Bay
- Maunalua Bay
- Ma‘alaea Bay

== Louisiana ==
- Kayden Baites Bay
- Bay Chene Fleur
- Vermilion Bay

== Maine ==
- Casco Bay
- Chandler Bay
- Cobscook Bay
- Dennys Bay
- Dyer Bay
- Englishman Bay
- Frenchman Bay
- Gouldsboro Bay
- Harrington Bay
- Johnson Bay
- Little Kennebec Bay
- Little Machias Bay
- Machias Bay
- Merrymeeting Bay
- Narraguagus Bay
- Passamaquoddy Bay
- Penobscot Bay
- Pigeon Hill Bay
- Saco Bay

== Maryland ==
- Assawoman Bay
- Chesapeake Bay
- Chincoteague Bay
- Fishing Bay
- Herring Bay
- Isle of Wight Bay
- Mallows Bay
- Sinepuxent Bay

== Massachusetts ==
- Assonet Bay
- Buttermilk Bay
- Buzzards Bay
- Cape Cod Bay
- Duxbury Bay
- Massachusetts Bay
- Narragansett Bay
- Plymouth Bay
- Popponesset Bay
- Quincy Bay
- Waquoit Bay

== Michigan ==
- Anchor Bay
- Ashmun Bay
- Au Train Bay
- Bete Grise Bay
- Big Bay de Noc
- Brest Bay
- East Moran Bay
- Good Harbor Bay
- Grand Traverse Bay
- Green Bay
- Hammond Bay
- Huron Bay
- Keweenaw Bay
- Little Bay de Noc
- Little Traverse Bay
- Misery Bay
- Oronto Bay
- Potagannissing Bay
- Saginaw Bay
- Sleeping Bear Bay
- Thunder Bay
- Torch Bay
- Whitefish Bay

== Mississippi ==
- Bay of Saint Louis
- Biloxi Bay

== Nevada ==
- Crystal Bay
- Las Vegas Bay

== New Hampshire ==
- Great Bay

== New Jersey ==
- Barnegat Bay
- Delaware Bay
- Great Bay
- Manahawkin Bay
- Newark Bay
- Raritan Bay
- Sandy Hook Bay
- Upper New York Bay

== New York ==
- Gardiners Bay
- Great South Bay
- Jamaica Bay
- Lower New York Bay
- Patchogue Bay
- Peconic Bay
- Raritan Bay
- South Oyster Bay
- Upper New York Bay

== North Carolina ==
- Long Bay
- Onslow Bay
- Raleigh Bay
- Stumpy Point Bay

== Ohio ==
- Sandusky Bay
- Maumee Bay
- Put-In-Bay
- Manila Bay

== Oregon ==
- Alsea Bay
- Boiler Bay
- Coos Bay
- Depoe Bay
- Nehalem Bay
- Nestucca Bay
- Netarts Bay
- Tillamook Bay
- Winchester Bay
- Yaquina Bay
- Youngs Bay

== Pennsylvania ==
- Presque Isle Bay

== Rhode Island ==
- Mount Hope Bay
- Narragansett Bay
- Greenwich Bay

== South Carolina ==
- Bulls Bay
- Long Bay
- Winyah Bay

== Texas ==
- Aransas Bay
- Baffin Bay
- Copano Bay
- Corpus Christi Bay
- East Matagorda Bay
- Galveston Bay
- Laguna Madre
- Matagorda Bay
- Nueces Bay
- Oso Bay
- San Antonio Bay
- Trinity Bay

== Virginia ==
- Belmont Bay
- Burtons Bay
- Chincoteague Bay
- Mobjack Bay
- Chesapeake Bay
- Cameron Bay

== Washington ==
- Bellingham Bay
- Birch Bay
- Boundary Bay
- Commencement Bay
- Elliott Bay
- Liberty Bay
- Massacre Bay
- Padilla Bay
- Portage Bay
- Salmon Bay
- Samish Bay
- Sequim Bay
- Shilshole Bay
- Skagit Bay
- Semiahmoo Bay
- Union Bay
- Willapa Bay

== Wisconsin ==
- Chequamegon Bay
- Detroit Harbor
- Green Bay
- Oronto Bay
- Pokegama Bay
- Sturgeon Bay
- Superior Bay
