= Little Bay (disambiguation) =

Little Bay often refers to Little Bay, New South Wales, a suburb in south-eastern Sydney, Australia.

Little Bay may also refer to:

== Bodies of water ==
=== United States ===
- Little Bay (New Hampshire), a bay near the Atlantic Ocean in New Hampshire
- Little Bay de Noc, a bay in the Upper Peninsula of Michigan

=== Elsewhere ===
- Little Bay (Newfoundland and Labrador), a bay in Canada
- Little Bay, Sint Maarten, a coastal pond in the Dutch Caribbean
- Mysterious Little Bay, a bay in Dongju Island, Taiwan

== Communities ==
=== Canada ===
Each of the following is located in Newfoundland and Labrador

- Little Bay, Newfoundland and Labrador, a town in the central part of Newfoundland
- Little Bay (Port au Port Peninsula), a community on the southwest coast of Newfoundland
- Little Bay East, a town near Bay L'Argent in the southern part of Newfoundland
- Little Bay Islands, a vacant town spanning several islands in the northern part of Newfoundland

=== Elsewhere ===
- Little Bay, Montserrat, the planned future capital of Montserrat in the Caribbean
- Oban, a resort town in Argyll, Scotland, whose Gaelic name An t-Òban translates as "The Little Bay"

== Other uses ==
- Little Bay Battery, an artillery battery in Gibraltar
- Little Bay Bridge, located in New Hampshire, U.S.

== Similarly named ==
- Little Andrews Bay Marine Provincial Park, in British Columbia, Canada
- Little Assawoman Bay, a body of water in Sussex County, Delaware, U.S.
- Little Kennebec Bay, a bay on the coast of Maine, U.S.
- Little Machias Bay, a bay in Cutler, Washington County, Maine, U.S.
- Little Narragansett Bay, an inlet of the Atlantic Ocean on the Rhode Island–Connecticut state line, U.S.
- Little Pike Bay, a bay off Lake Huron in south-western Ontario, Canada
- Little Traverse Bay, a small open bay of Lake Michigan, U.S.

== See also ==
- Big Bay (disambiguation)
