= Floyds Bay =

Floyds Bay may refer to:

Places

- Burtons Bay, a bay on the coast of Virginia formerly known as Floyds Bay

Ships

- USS Floyds Bay (AVP-40), a United States Navy seaplane tender in commission from 1945 to 1960
