= Petit Manan Light =

Lighthouse in Maine, US

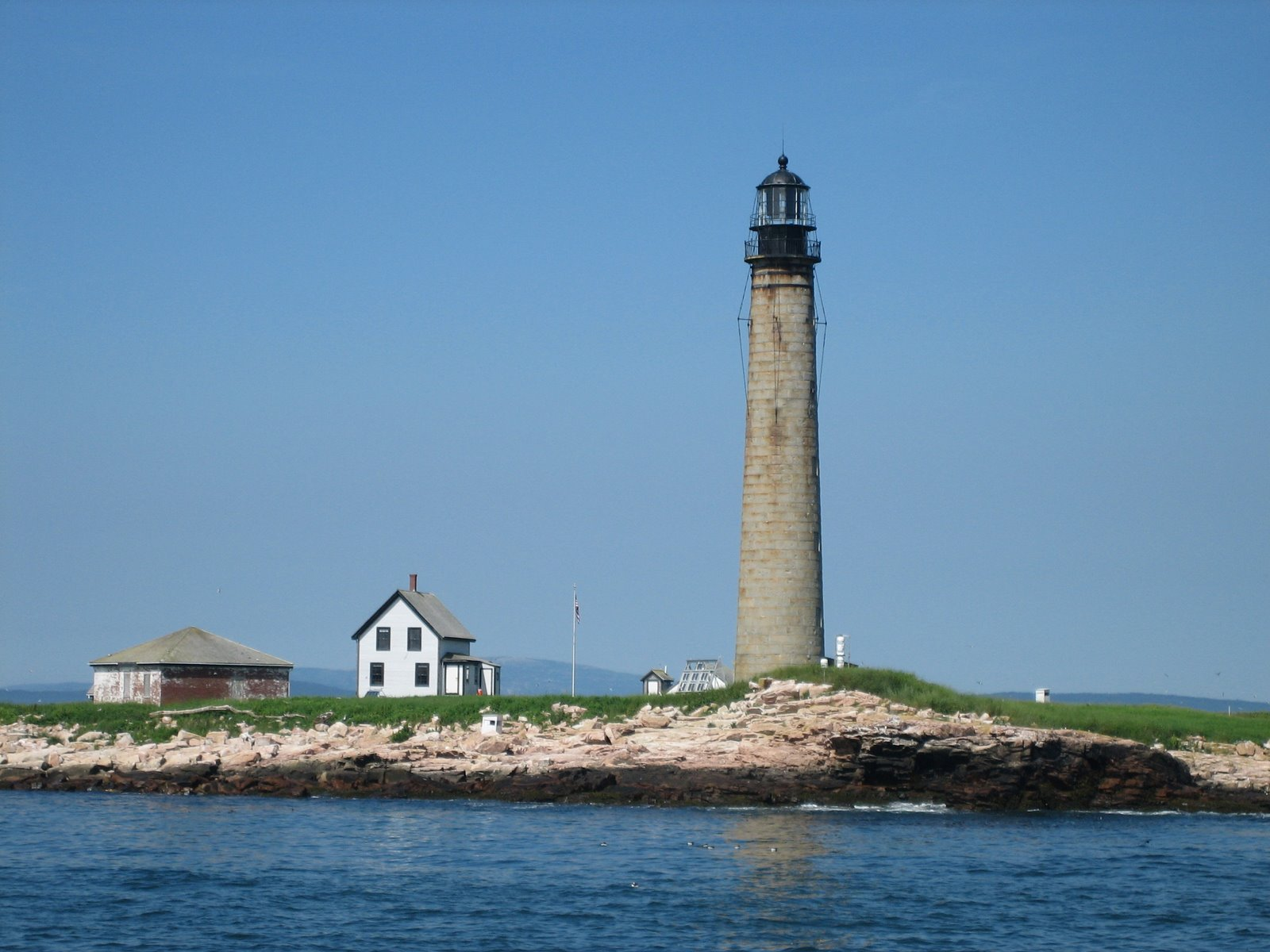
- Location: Petit Manan Island, Maine
- Coordinates: 44°22′3.29″N 67°51′51.7″W

Tower
- Constructed: 1817
- Construction: stone
- Automated: 1972
- Height: 36 m (118 ft)
- Shape: Conical Granite Tower
- Markings: Natural Granite
- Heritage: National Register of Historic Places listed place
- Fog signal: HORN: 1 every 30s

Light
- First lit: 1855 (current structure)
- Focal height: 123 feet (37 m)
- Lens: Second Order Fresnel lens (original), VRB-25 (current)
- Range: 19 nautical miles (35 km; 22 mi)
- Characteristic: Fl W 10s
- Petit Manan Light Station
- U.S. National Register of Historic Places
- U.S. Historic district
- Nearest city: Milbridge, Maine
- Built: 1855
- Architect: US Army Corps. of Engineers
- Architectural style: Late Victorian
- NRHP reference No.: 87001879
- Added to NRHP: October 30, 1987

Petit Manan Light is a lighthouse on Petit Manan Island, Maine. The island is at the end of a series of ledges extending out from Petit Manan Point, between Dyer Bay and Pigeon Hill Bay, that projects into the Gulf of Maine.

== Description ==
The Petit Manan light station consists of a light tower, keeper's house, boathouse, and other outbuildings. The tower is a circular granite stone structure, 109 feet (33 m) in height and 20 feet (6.1 m) in diameter at its base. Atop this is mounted a two-story twelve-sided lantern house, placing the light's focal plan at 123 feet (37 m). The inside of the tower is lined with brick, and has iron stairs. The keeper's house is a two-story wood frame structure. Accompanying outbuildings include a rain shed (possibly built in 1868), paint shed (1876), generator building (1887), and boathouse (probably built 1868, and enlarged 1900).

== History ==
It was first established in 1817 as a small stone lighthouse. The present structure was built in 1855, and the keeper's house in 1875. The original lens was an enormous second order Fresnel which is now on display at the Maine Lighthouse Museum in Rockland, Maine. Being in a very exposed position, it has suffered storm damage from time to time. In 1856 a storm knocked out some of its blocks. In 1869, it swayed enough that the weights that turn the lens fell, damaging the staircase. Finally, in 1887, iron tie rods were installed to stabilize it. The light was automated in 1972, at which time the Fresnel lens was removed. The light was out of service for two months in 2001 after a nor'easter damaged its submarine power cable; as a result it was converted to solar power later that year.

The light station is part of the Petit Manan Wildlife Refuge and is not open to the public. There is a colony of breeding puffins on the island. There are boat tours to the island.

It is the second tallest light tower in Maine and is very similar to the Boon Island Light which is slightly taller and was built in the same year. Petit Manan Light was listed on the National Register of Historic Places as Petit Manan Light Station on October 30, 1987.

== See also ==
- National Register of Historic Places listings in Washington County, Maine
