= Birch Point =

- U.S. National Register of Historic Places
- Location within Maine Location within the United States
- Nearest city: Machiasport, Maine
- Coordinates: 44°40′38″N 67°22′34″W
- Area: 0.1 acres (0.040 ha)
- MPS: Native American Petroglyphs and Pictographs of Maine MPS
- NRHP reference No.: 97000913
- Added to NRHP: December 9, 1997

Birch Point, also known as Clark's Point, is a peninsula in Machiasport, Maine. It separates Sanborn Cove to the north from Larrabee Cove to the south on the west side of Machias Bay, a short way south of the mouth of the Machias River. The point is of prehistoric and historic importance to the local Passamaquoddy people, as it is the site of large panels of rock art which have been listed on the National Register of Historic Places.

== Geography ==
Machias Bay is a major indentation of the coast of Down East Maine, the easternmost part of the continental United States. The bay is fed from the north by the Machias River, and empties into the Gulf of Maine. Holmes Point is the northernmost of a series of projects on the west side of the bay, projecting eastward from a larger north–south peninsula separating the bay from Little Kennebec Bay to the west. The peninsula is shaped roughly like a clenched fist with the thumb extended to the east. The point, like other coastal landforms in the area, is partly a product of isostatic rebound, because of which sea level has been rising since the end of the last Ice Age.

== History ==
Birch Point is estimated to have been a site of human activity for more than 3,000 years. This is based on part on analysis of the extensive panels of rock art found on tidally-washed parts of the peninsula. These panels were first formally described by Garrick Mallery in 1888, and are part of a much larger assortment of rock art found in southeastern Maine. Mallery described 57 figures, pecked into the rock faces by repeated blows of harder stone implements. The oldest figures are believed to be those closest to the water (and now often submerged), while the upper portions of the ledges on which they appear are free of art, corresponding to the Natives loss of control of the area in the 18th century.

The rock art sites were listed on the National Register of Historic Places in 1997 for their archaeological significance. In 2006 the coastal properties containing the rock art panels were given to the Passamaquoddy tribe by the nonprofit Maine Coast Heritage Trust in exchange for conservation easements on tribal land nearby.

== See also ==
- Rock art of eastern Maine
- National Register of Historic Places listings in Washington County, Maine
