= Big Bay =

Big Bay may refer to:

- Big Bay, British Columbia, Canada
- Big Bay, Michigan, United States
- Big Bay (New Zealand), New Zealand
- Big Bay, Espiritu Santo, Vanuatu
- Big Bay Short Range Radar Site, Canada

== See also ==
- Big Bay Dam
- Big Bay State Park
- Big Wave Bay (disambiguation)
- Little Bay (disambiguation)
- Tai Wan, literally "Big Bay"
