= Hells Bay =

Coordinates: 25.253°N 80.883°W

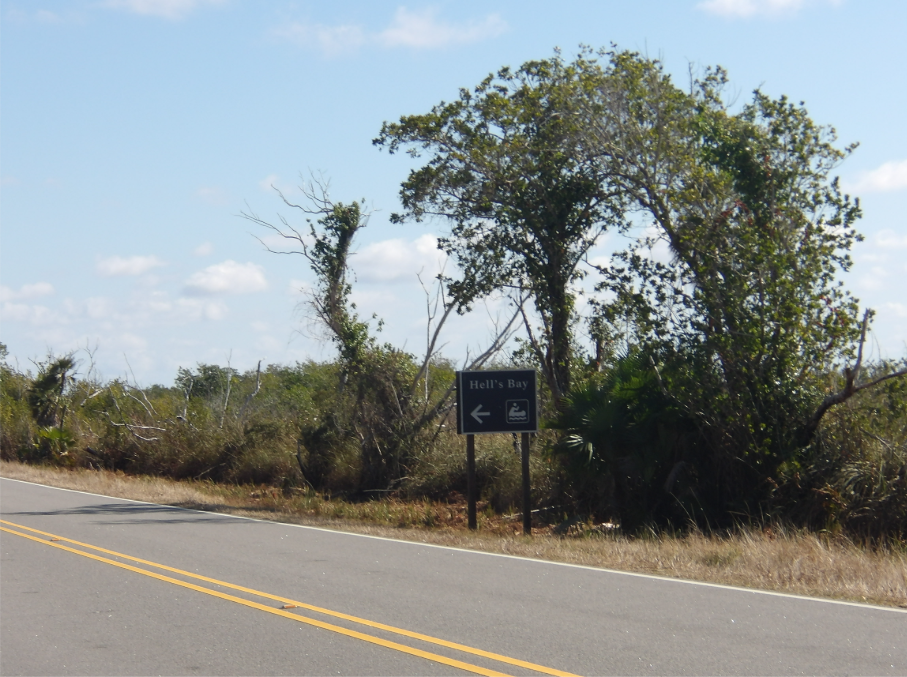

Hells Bay is a series of shallow creeks, bays and glades located in the Everglades National Park in Cape Sable, Florida.

It is located on the southeast section of Whitewater Bay and is accessible by boat from the east through the bay and from the west via a marked canoe trail maintained by the Park Service. The Park Service also maintains chickees throughout the area and allows overnight camping by permit.

Hell's Bay trail is 5.5 miles (8.3 km) long and is mostly cattails, seagrass, and mangroves. Bull sharks, alligators, and other reptiles and animals occupy the area around the trail. There are several chickees and camps along the 5 mile route. The trail starts beside State Road 9336 and terminates at the junction between the Hell's Bay trail and the Everglades Paddling trail.

Despite getting its name in part from fishermen calling it "hell to get into and hell to get out of", Hells Bay is a popular area for angling Largemouth bass and Crevalle jack. Because the water is so shallow, just inches in many parts, access largely limited to canoes, skiffs and flats.
