= Dickinson Bayou =

Coordinates: 29.46156°N 94.99994°W

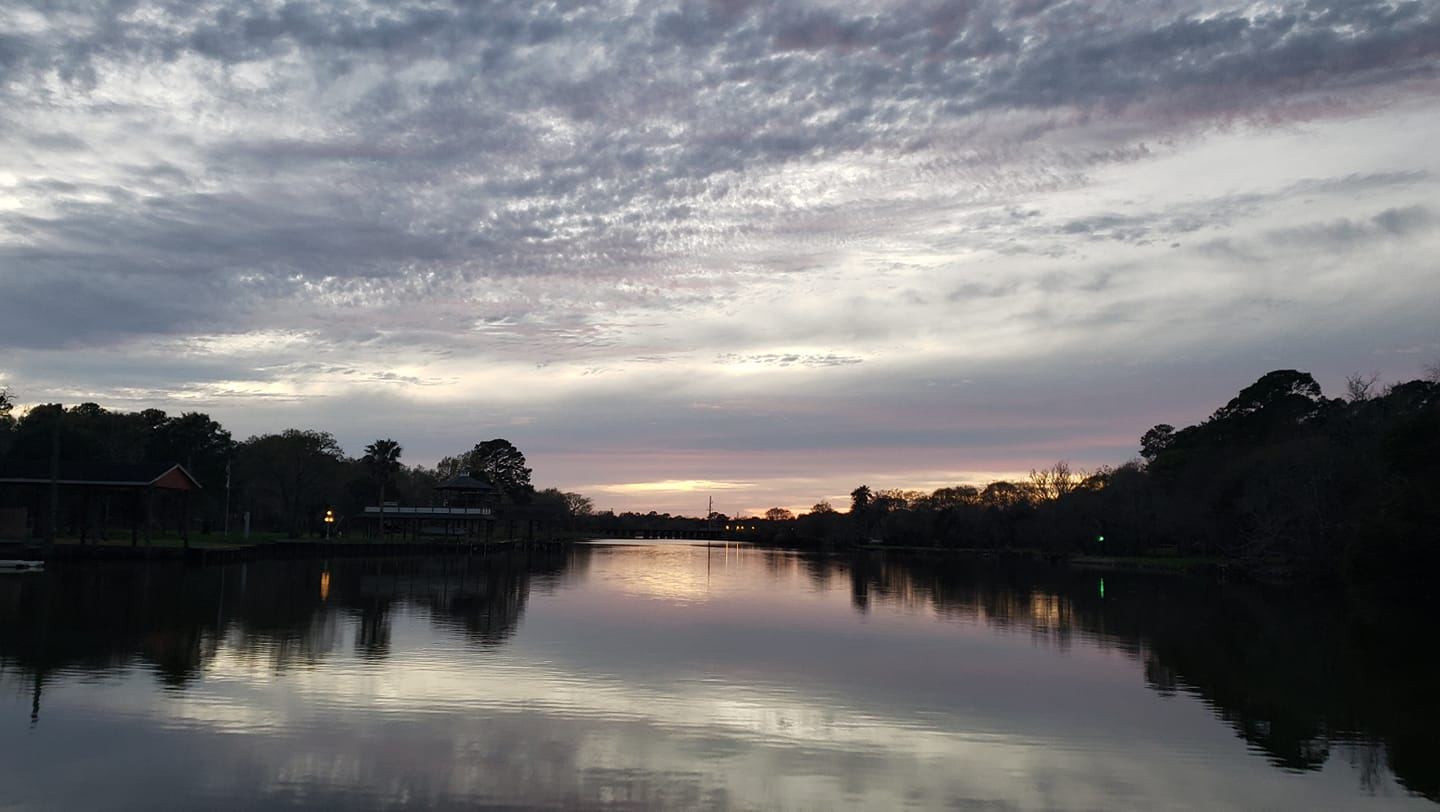
- Dickinson Bayou at sunset

Location
- Country: United States

Physical characteristics
- Source
  - location: Alvin, Texas
  - elevation: 0 ft (0 m)
- Mouth
  - location: San Leon, Texas
  - elevation: 0 ft (0 m)
- Length: Over 20 miles (32 km)

Dickinson Bayou is a bayou in Texas.

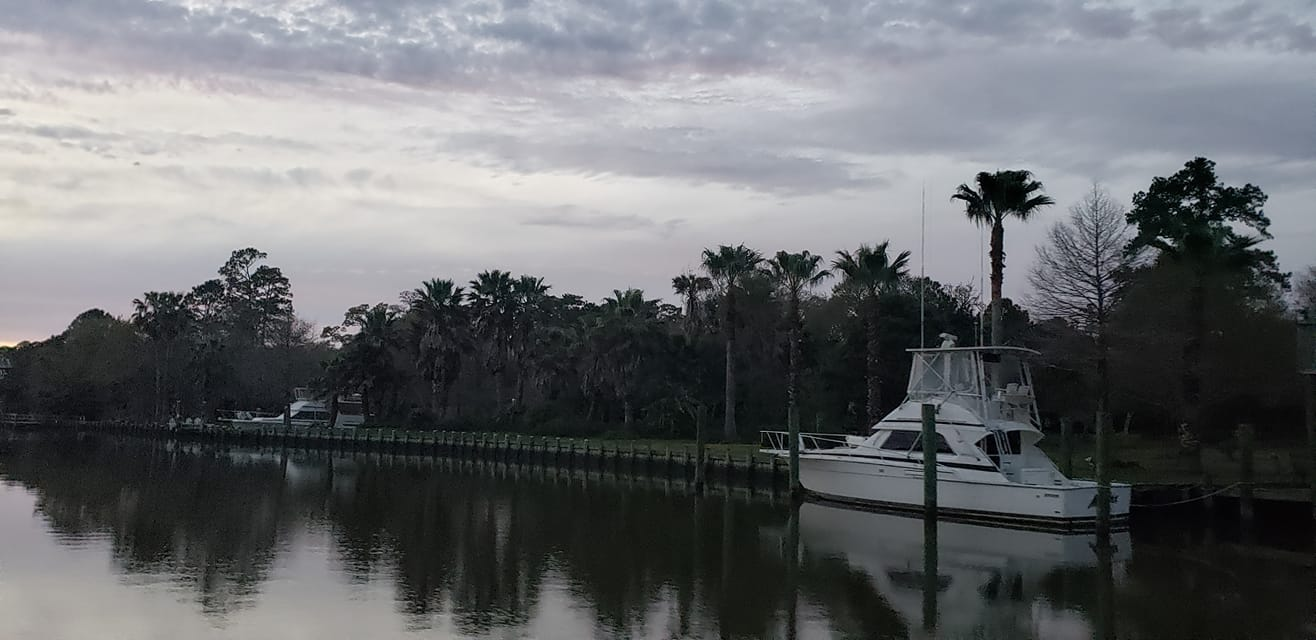
Boats on Dickinson Bayou

Dickinson Bayou is located in southeast Texas in the San Jacinto-Brazos Coastal Basin. Dickinson Bayou rises two miles northeast of Alvin in northwestern Galveston County (at 29°29' N, 95°14' W) and flows east for over 20 miles to its mouth on Dickinson Bay and Galveston Bay, just south of San Leon and a mile east of the Southern Pacific Railroad (at 29°28' N, 94°57' W). It traverses flat to rolling prairie surfaced by dark, commonly calcareous clays that support mesquite, grasses, and cacti. In the lower reaches of the bayou the soil changes to sandy and clay loams that support scrub brush, hardwoods, and pines.

Residents of Dickinson still take the time and the slight risk to enjoy many of the bayou's activities. Those who do so engage in fishing, canoeing, water skiing, swimming, and sight seeing. Two locations are designated for launching watercraft one location being where highway 3 intersects with the bayou for launching boats and small watercraft. The other location is at Paul Hopkins park on FM517. Kayaks and small shallow water boats can travel deep i to the tributaries. The greatest concentration of tributaries fall within the city limits of Dickinson, Texas. These tributaries pass through many neighborhoods. Major named tributaries that flow to Dickinson Bayou include Gum Bayou, Benson Bayou, Magnolia (Geisler) Bayou, Bordens Gully, Cedar Creek, and LaFlore's Bayou. Many of these tributaries flow over private property as noted on Galveston County CAD maps. Local residents often have backyard access to the bayou as noted in the picture top left.

Fishing is a popular activity for those visiting Dickinson Bayou. In dry summers drought the water becomes saltier and produces many smaller saltwater fish not usually seen in brackish water. These include ladyfish, redfish, croaker, piggy perch, and an occasional speckled trout. In the winter months, flounder make an appearance in the section of the bayou closest to the bay. Spring brings out small largemouth bass and catfish in the lower reaches of the bayou.

The bayou plays host to the Dickinson Festival of Lights every Christmas at Paul Hopkins Park. The nearly 1 million lights reflect from the bayou's murky waters.

Dickinson Bayou is on the state's list of water bodies not meeting water quality standards for dissolved oxygen (DO) and bacteria levels. As a result, the bayou does not meet its aquatic life use nor its contact recreation use, creating a possible environmental and/or public health concern.

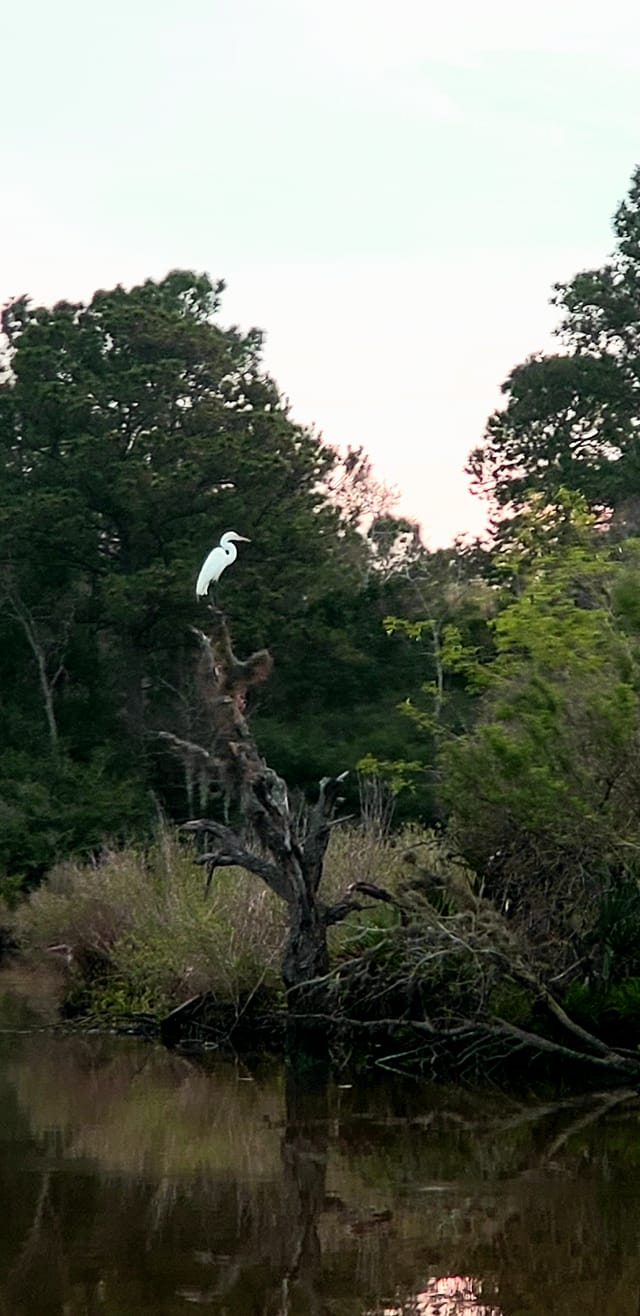
Great egret nesting on Dickinson Bayou

== See also ==
- Dickinson, Texas
- Dickinson Bay (Texas)
- List of rivers of Texas
