= Prospect Harbor Point Light =

Lighthouse in Maine, US

Prospect Harbor Point Light Prospect Harbor Point Light
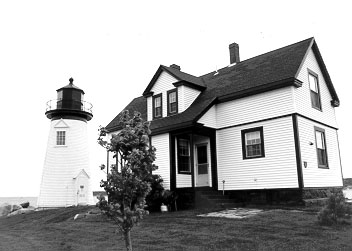
- USCG photo of 1891 structure
- Location: Prospect Harbor, Maine
- Coordinates: 44°24′11.7″N 68°0′46.4″W

Tower
- Constructed: 1850
- Construction: structural wood
- Automated: 1951
- Height: 11.5 m (38 ft)
- Shape: Conical Tower
- Markings: White
- Heritage: National Register of Historic Places listed place
- Fog signal: none

Light
- First lit: 1891 (current structure)
- Deactivated: 1859-1870
- Focal height: 42 feet (13 m)
- Range: 9 nautical miles (17 km; 10 mi) & 7 nautical miles (13 km; 8.1 mi)
- Characteristic: Fl R 6s with 2 W sectors
- Prospect Harbor Light Station
- U.S. National Register of Historic Places
- U.S. Historic district
- Nearest city: Prospect Harbor, Maine
- Built: 1891
- Architect: US Army Corps of Engineers
- MPS: Light Stations of Maine MPS
- NRHP reference No.: 88000151
- Added to NRHP: March 14, 1988

Prospect Harbor Point Light is a lighthouse on Prospect Harbor Point, which divides Sand Cove from Inner Harbor at the head of Prospect Harbor on the southern shore of Gouldsboro, Maine. Also known as Prospect Harbor Light, it was first established in 1850. The present structure was built in 1891. It was listed on the National Register of Historic Places as Prospect Harbor Light Station in 1988.

== Description and history ==
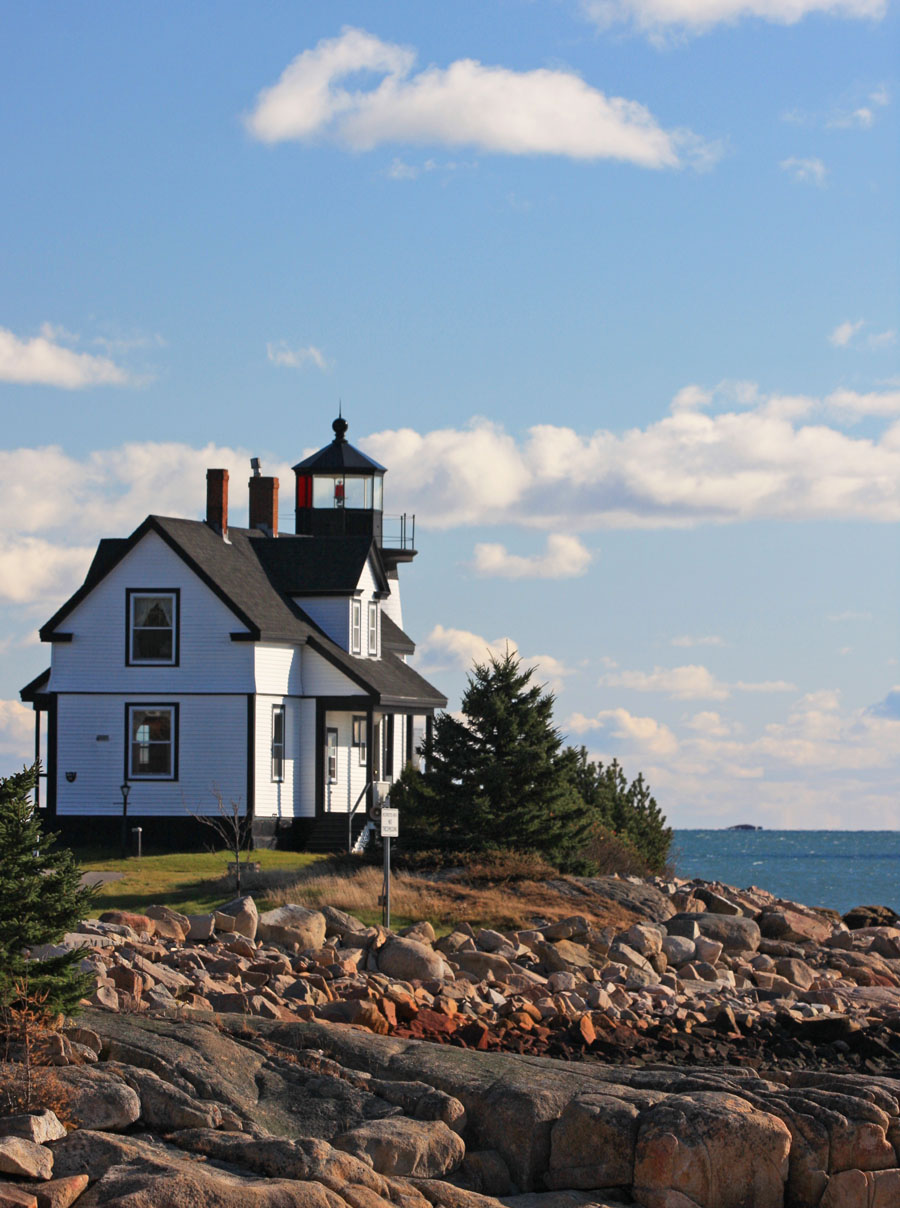

The light station at Prospect Harbor was authorized by Congress in 1847 and went into operation in 1850. At that time Prospect Harbor was home to a significant fishing fleet. The light was deactivated in 1859, after the United States Lighthouse Board claimed it was not needed because the harbor was not used as a shelter during storms. It was reactivated in 1870. In 1891 the station was rebuilt; the present tower and keeper's house date to this period. The brick oil house was added in 1905. The light was automated in 1934, but keepers remained on site until 1951, when its Fresnel lens was removed and replaced by modern optics. The station last underwent major restorative work in the early 2000s; it remains an active aid to navigation.

The first tower built (in 1848) was a rubble-stone tower. This tower was replaced in 1891 by the present round wood-frame tower, which is 38 feet (12 m) in height and clad in wooden shingles. It is capped by a lantern house which is topped by a polygonal roof, and surrounded by a in iron walkway with railing. The door is on the north side, and there is a window on the west side. When built, a covered walkway joined the tower to the keeper's house, but this has been removed. The keeper's house is a two-story wood-frame structure, clad in shingles on the upper floor and clapboard on the first floor. A porch extends across part of its front, with four square posts and slatted balustrade. The roof of the porch is a continuation of the main roof, and is pierced by a gable-roof dormer. The keeper's house was heavily damaged in a June 27, 2022 fire, which was ruled accidental.

The small brick oilhouse stands a short way north of the house and tower.

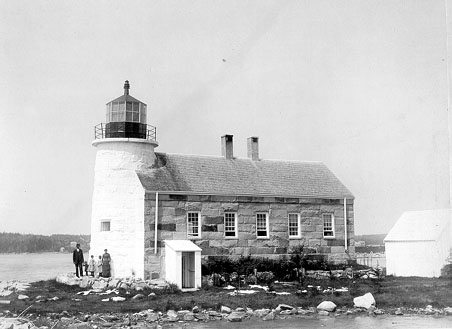
USCG photo of 1850 structure

== See also ==
- List of lighthouses in Maine
- National Register of Historic Places listings in Hancock County, Maine
