= Ingraham Lake =

Lake in the state of Florida, United States

- Location within Florida Location within the United States
- Location: Everglades National Park, Monroe County, Florida, US
- Coordinates: 25°09′28″N 81°06′28″W
- Primary outflows: East Cape Canal
- Basin countries: United States
- Surface elevation: 0 m (0 ft)

Ingraham Lake is a lake in Monroe County, Florida, United States. It located within the limits of Everglades National Park. It is the southernmost lake in the continental United States, located in Cape Sable, and is less than 1,000 acres (4 km^{2}) in size. It is 71 miles (114 km) southwest of Miami. It is accessible to the Gulf Of Mexico by the Middle Cape Canal at its northern border of the lake. It is accessible to Florida Bay by East Cape Canal, at the southern border of the lake. The entire lake is at sea level.

== See also ==
- Everglades National Park
- Florida Bay
- Gulf of Mexico
