= Rock art of eastern Maine =

- Holmes Point
- U.S. National Register of Historic Places
- Nearest city: Machiasport, Maine
- Area: 1 acre (0.40 ha)
- MPS: Native American Petroglyphs and Pictographs of Maine MPS
- NRHP reference No.: 97000914
- Added to NRHP: December 9, 1997

The eastern part of the United States state of Maine is known to have historically significant examples of prehistoric and historic rock art. The easternmost shore ("Down East Maine"), particularly the shores and islands of Machias Bay, contain one of the greatest concentrations of rock art on the east coast of North America, with creation dates estimated to range from c. 1000 BCE to beyond the European contact period. Many of these sites are listed on the United States National Register of Historic Places.

== Shore sites ==
Machias Bay is a broad inlet of the Gulf of Maine in the far eastern part of the state, and is where the Machias River's mouth is located. The bay is dotted with numerous islands and rock ledges, which are washed by the area's high tides. Two of the bay's interior peninsulas, flanking the river mouth, are noted for their archaeological significance as prehistoric Native American occupation sites, and for their petroglyphs. Birch Point is located on the west side of the bay in Machiasport, and is the site of panels containing at least 57 rock art figures. Holmes Point, in East Machias, is the northernmost promontory of Holmes Bay, and also has a significant series of panels. These panels are typically arranged with the oldest petroglyphs to the seaward side, with a blank panels on the landward side representing the period from the late 18th century forward, when the local Passamaquoddy people lost control of the area.

== Hog Island ==
Located in the bay, roughly midway between Holmes Point and Sprague Neck, the southern promontory of Holmes Bay, lies Hog Island, which is the site of a number of rock art panels. These include examples of anthropomorphic figures that are stylistically distinctive from those found at other sites in the area. Also found there and at Holmes Point are later figures that have a more complex anthropomorphic appearance that simple stick figures. Four panel sites, designated 62.23, 62.24, 62.25, and 62.29, are listed on the National Register.

== Grand Lake Stream ==
One rock art site is located well inland from Machias Bay, near the village of Grand Lake Stream. Located on a rock ledge on a historically frequented canoe route, its figures were incised with metal tools, probably in the 19th century, along with pecked pictographs that are apparently of late 20th-century origin. In addition to human figures, there are thunderbird motifs, a serpent or snake figure, and a deer with antlers. This site, designated 94.32, is also on the National Register, and is suggestive that the tradition of rock art creation continues in the local Native community.

== Representations of European ships ==
Two sites, 62.46 and 62.47, include representations of small European sailing ships. Dr. Mark Hedden, an archaeologist specialized in Maine's rock art, believes them to be consistent with small ships used by Plymouth Colony traders who are known to have paid visits to Machias Bay in the early 1630s. They are located on rock ledges in the bay, and only 62.46 is complete; the panel at 62.47 has suffered spalling, and all of its figures are fragmentary.

== See also ==
- National Register of Historic Places listings in Washington County, Maine
