= Dickinson Bay (Texas) =

Inlet of Galveston Bay, Texas, United States

- Location within Texas Location within the United States
- Location: Galveston Bay, Texas, United States
- Coordinates: 29°28′7″N 94°56′45″W
- River sources: Dickinson Bayou
- Ocean/sea sources: Gulf of Mexico
- Basin countries: United States
- Max. length: 1 mile (1.6 km)
- Max. width: 1 mile (1.6 km)
- Settlements: San Leon

Dickinson Bay is an inlet of Galveston Bay in Texas, United States within the Greater Houston metropolitan area. It is fed by Dickinson Bayou and the community of San Leon sits on a peninsula to its north.
