= Johnson Bay =

Bay in Maine, United States

Coordinates: 44°52′N 67°00′W

Johnson Bay is a bay in Lubec, Maine, United States.

It is separated from the Lubec Channel by Lubec Neck to the southeast and from Cobscook Bay by Seward Neck to the west. It is bounded on the north by Moose Island in Eastport and on the east by Campobello Island, New Brunswick, Canada.

The bay extends roughly 3 mi. (5 km).

The bay is also represented by its sunset, which many think is beautiful.
