= Prospect Harbor =

Coordinates: 44°23′N 68°01′W

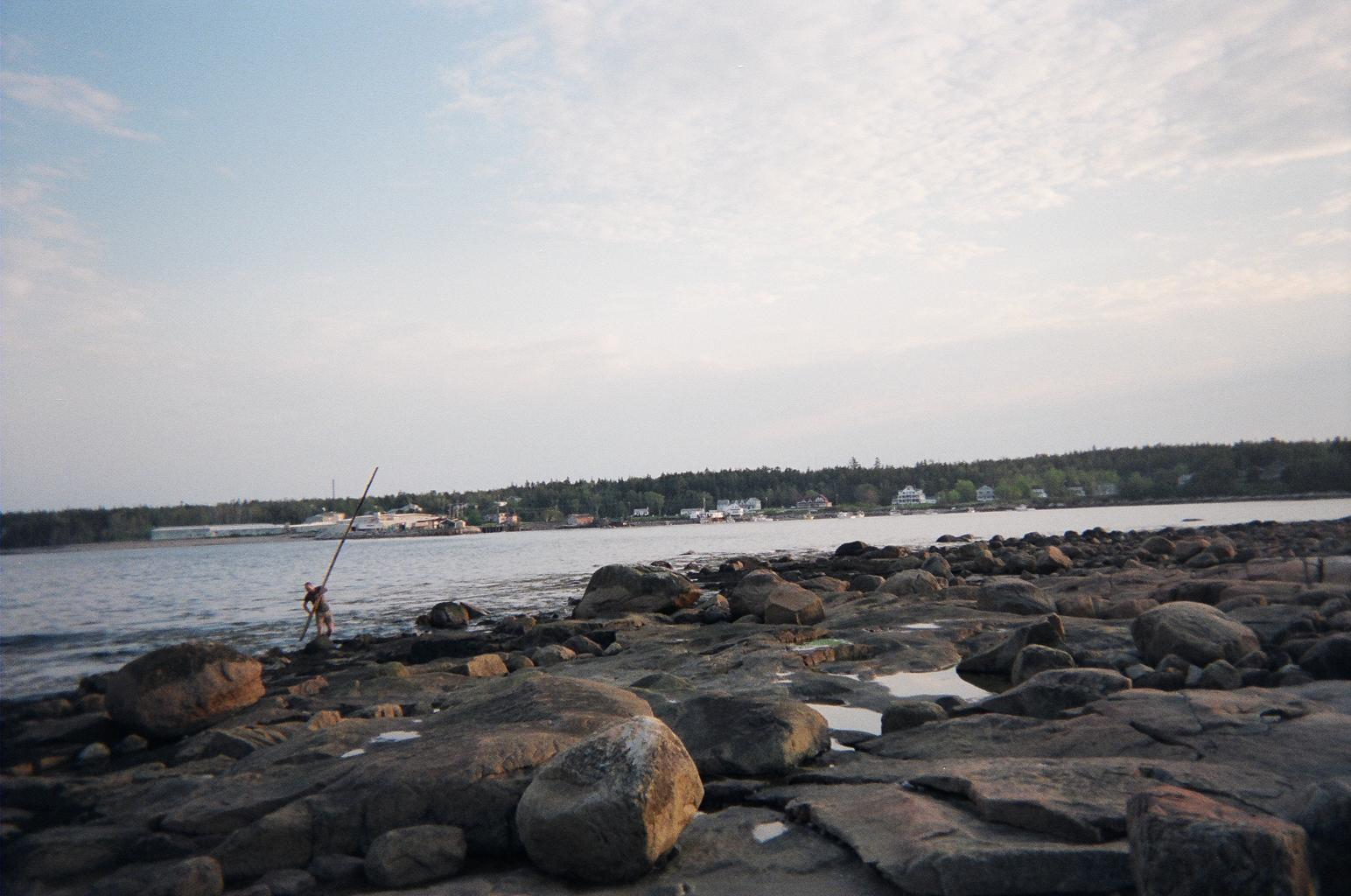
- Prospect Harbor
- Interactive map of Prospect Harbor
- Country: United States
- State: Maine
- Time zone: UTC-5 (Eastern)
  - Summer (DST): Eastern
- ZIP code: 04669

Prospect Harbor is a bay in Gouldsboro, Maine. It is separated from Gouldsboro Bay to the northeast by Cranberry Point and from Winter Harbor to the west by the Schoodic Peninsula.

The bay is roughly 3 mi. (5 km) long and 3 mi. across (5 km) at its widest.
