= Bay Chene Fleur =

Bay in Plaquemines Parish, Louisiana, United States

Coordinates: 29.48411°N 89.89479°W

Bay Chene Fleur is a bay in Plaquemines Parish, Louisiana, in the United States.

Bay Chene Fleur is derived from the French for "Mistletoe Bay".
