= Ponce de Leon Bay =

Bay in Monroe County, Florida, United States of America

Coordinates: 25°21′N 81°08′W

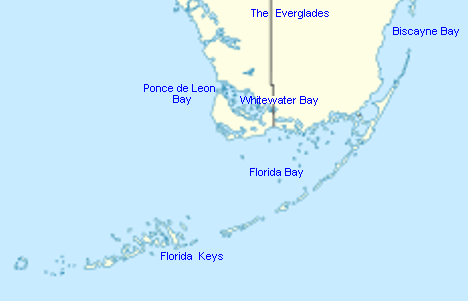
Map of South Florida waterways

Ponce de Leon Bay is a bay on the Gulf of Mexico in southwestern Florida in the United States. The bay is located in Monroe County at the northwestern end of Cape Sable in the Everglades National Park. Ponce de Leon Bay leads into Oyster Bay to the east, then into Whitewater Bay. The bay lies between Northwest Cape and Shark Point. It is named after Juan Ponce de León, a Spanish explorer who was the first recorded European to reach Florida.

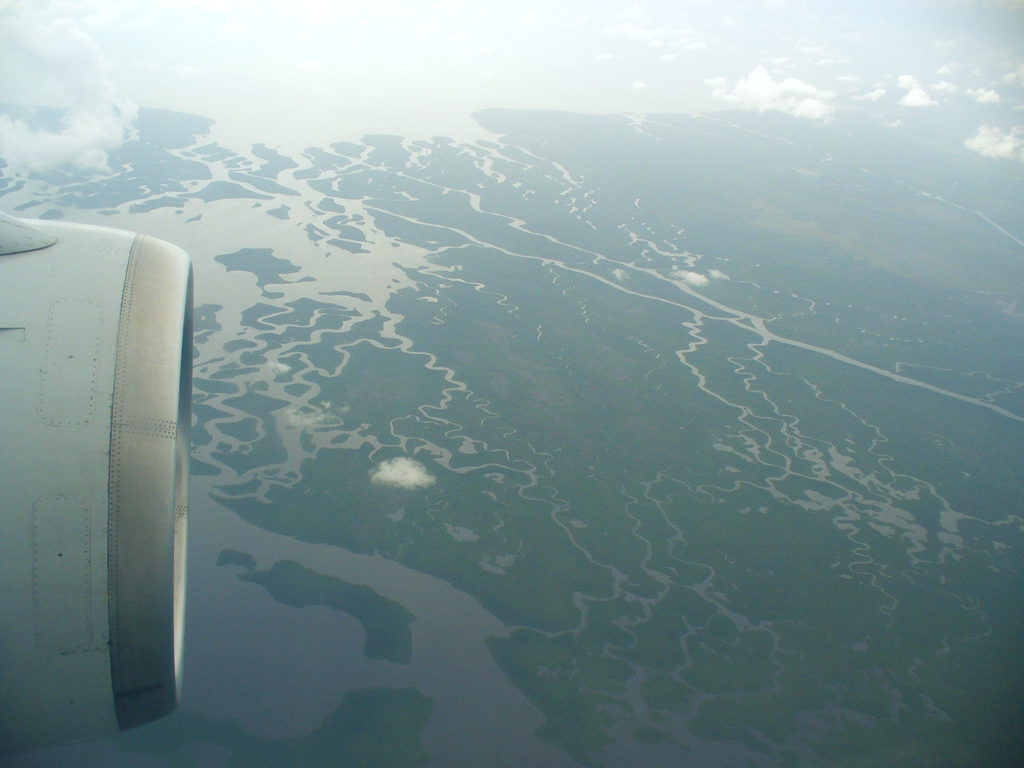
Ponce de Leon Bay is the bay in the upper part of this aerial view
