= Gouldsboro Bay =

Bay on the coast of Maine, U.S.

Coordinates: 44°26′N 67°58′W

Gouldsboro Bay is a bay on the coast of the U.S. state of Maine.

The bay is located between the towns of Gouldsboro and Steuben. It is separated from Dyer Bay to the west by Dyer Neck, from Prospect Harbor to the southwest by Cranberry Point, and from the Gulf of Maine by the Sally Islands.

The bay extends roughly 7 mi. (11 km) and is 2 mi. (3 km) at its widest.
