= Alsea Bay Historic Interpretive Center =

Public facility in Waldport, Oregon

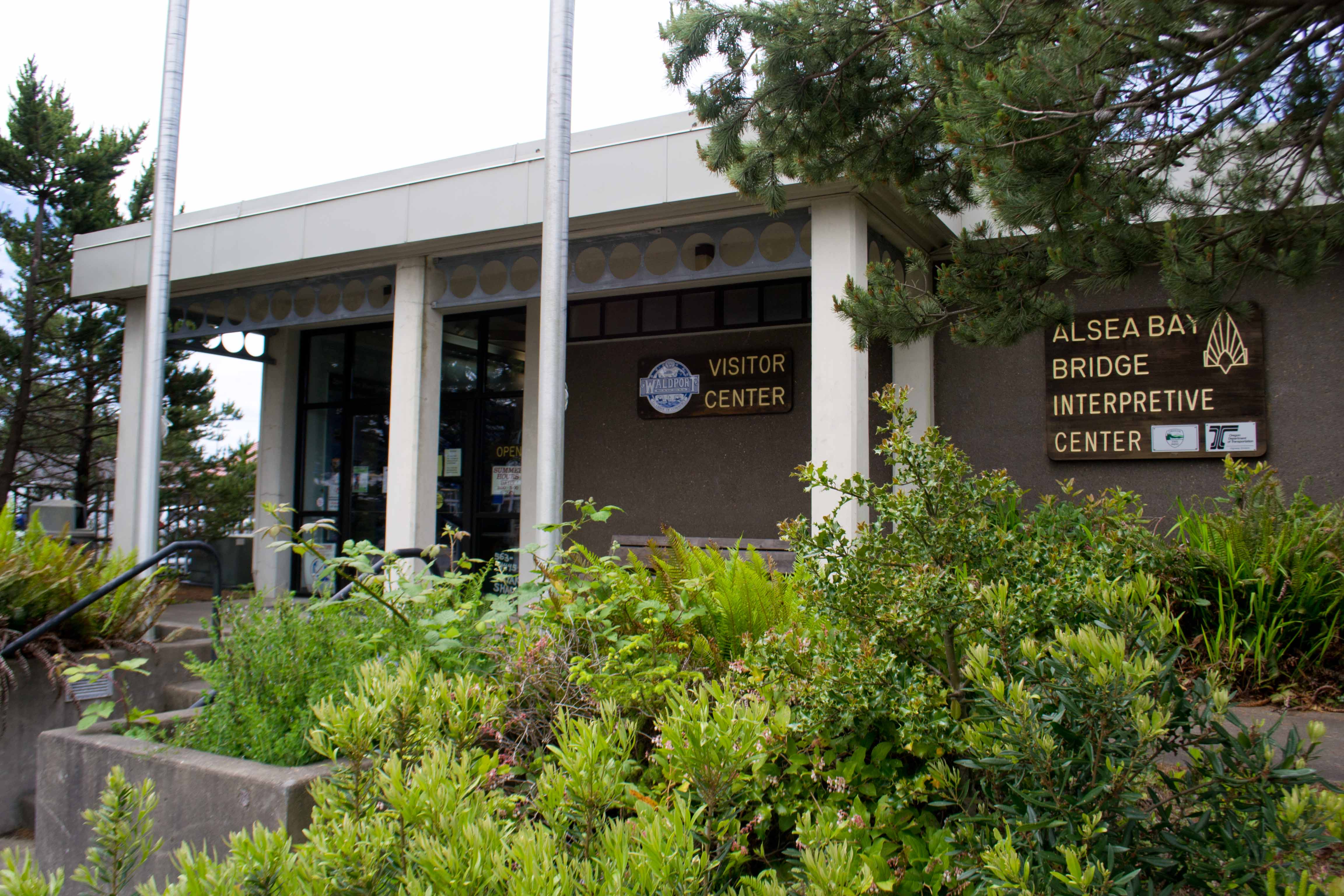

- Location within Oregon Location within the United States
- Type: Public, state
- Location: Lincoln County, Oregon
- Nearest city: Waldport
- Coordinates: 44°25′40″N 124°04′03″W
- Operator: City of Waldport

Alsea Bay Historic Interpretive Center is a public facility in Waldport, Oregon, administered and owned by the city of Waldport. It is adjacent to the Alsea Bay Bridge and was constructed by the Oregon Department of Transportation as part of the bridge replacement project. It was transferred to the city on Oct 8th, 2020 from the Oregon Department of Transportation.

The Center features displays about the building of bridges in Oregon, area transportation and Native Americans.

== See also ==
- Alsea
- Alsea, Oregon
