= Galveston Bay =

Estuary bay near Houston on the Texas Gulf Coast

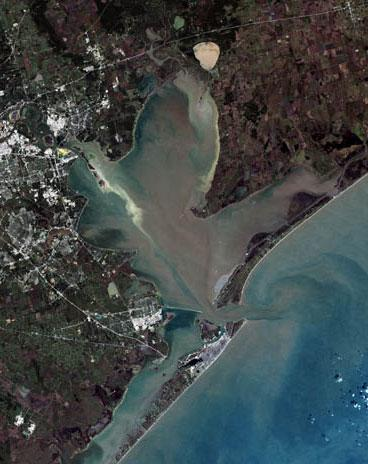
- Satellite image of Galveston Bay. Galveston Island is at the bottom of the image, separated from Bolivar Peninsula by Bolivar Roads. A portion of Greater Houston is visible to the left.

- Location within Texas
- Location: Texas Gulf Coast
- Coordinates: 29°34′11″N 94°56′12″W
- Primary inflows: Trinity River, San Jacinto River
- Ocean/sea sources: Gulf of Mexico
- Basin countries: United States
- Max. length: 30 miles (48 km)
- Max. width: 17 miles (27 km)
- Surface area: 345,280 acres (139,730 ha)
- Average depth: 6 feet (1.8 m)
- Max. depth: 10 feet (3.0 m)
- Settlements: Houston, Pasadena, League City, Baytown, Texas City, Galveston, La Porte, Seabrook, Anahuac

Galveston Bay (/ˈɡælvɪstən/ GAL-vis-tən) is a bay in the western Gulf of Mexico along the upper coast of Texas. It is the seventh-largest estuary in the United States, and the largest of seven major estuaries along the Texas Gulf Coast. It is connected to the Gulf of Mexico and is surrounded by subtropical marshes and prairies on the mainland. The water in the bay is a complex mixture of seawater and freshwater, which supports a wide variety of marine life. With a maximum depth of about 10 feet (3 m) and an average depth of only 6 feet (2 m), it is unusually shallow for its size.

The bay has played a significant role in the history of Texas. Galveston Island is home to the city of Galveston, the earliest major settlement in southeast Texas and the state's largest city toward the end of the nineteenth century. While a devastating hurricane in 1900 hastened Galveston's decline, the subsequent rise of Houston as a major trade center, facilitated by the dredging of the Houston Ship Channel across the western half of the bay, ensured the bay's continued economic importance.

Today, Galveston Bay is encompassed by Greater Houston, the fifth-largest metropolitan area in the United States. The Port of Houston, which has facilities spread across the northwestern section of the bay, is the second-busiest port in the nation by overall tonnage. Other major ports utilizing the bay include the Port of Texas City and the Port of Galveston. With its diverse marine life, Galveston Bay also produces more seafood than any estuary in the United States except the Chesapeake Bay.

== History ==
The Gulf Coast gained its present configuration during the most recent glacial period approximately 18 ka (thousands of years ago). Low global sea levels allowed the Texas mainland to extend significantly farther south than it does presently, and the Trinity River had carved a 170-foot (52 m) deep canyon through present-day Bolivar Roads (the exit of the Houston Ship Channel) on its way to the coast. As the glacial period came to a close, rising sea levels initially filled this narrow canyon, followed by the broad lowlands of present-day Trinity Bay. Rapid sea level rise between 7.7 and 5.5 ka shifted the Gulf coastline northward to its contemporary latitude. This was quickly followed by the formation of Galveston Island (5.5 ka), a barrier island, and Bolivar Peninsula (2.5 ka), which began as a spit.

Human settlement in what is now Texas began at least 10 ka following migrations into the Americas from Asia during the last ice age. The first substantial settlements in the area are believed to have been made by the Karankawa and Atakapan tribes, who lived throughout the Gulf Coast region.

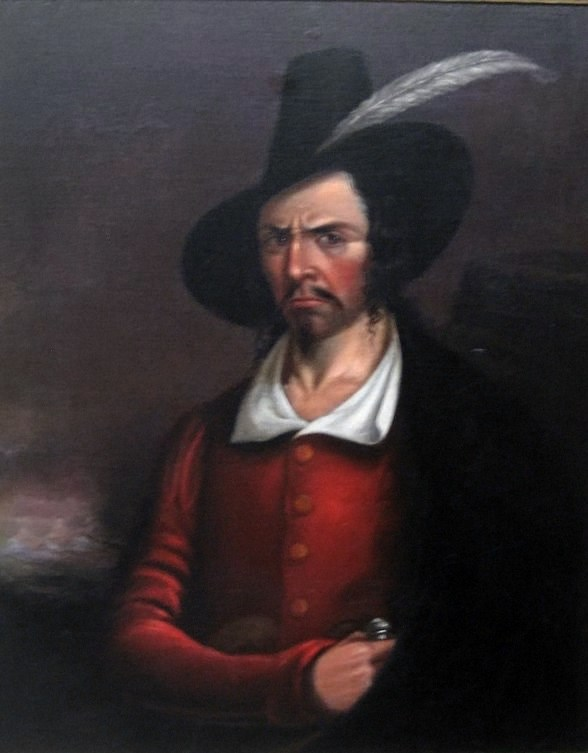
Anonymous portrait claimed to be of Jean Lafitte in the early 19th century

Though several Spanish expeditions charted the Gulf Coast, it was explorer José Antonio de Evia who, in 1785, gave the bay and the island the name Gálvezton in honor of Spanish viceroy Bernardo de Gálvez. Louis Aury established a naval base at the harbor in 1816 to support the Mexican War of Independence. When he abandoned the base, it was then taken over by pirate Jean Lafitte, who temporarily transformed Galveston Island and the bay into a haven for outlaws before being ousted by the United States Navy. Following its independence from Spain, the new nation of Mexico claimed Texas as part of its territory. Settlements were established around the bay, including Galveston, Anahuac, Lynchburg, and San Jacinto. Following growing unrest, Texas revolted and gained independence in 1836 at the Battle of San Jacinto, near the bay along the San Jacinto River. The new Republic of Texas grew rapidly and joined the United States in 1845.

After the election of Abraham Lincoln in 1860, residents of Galveston strongly supported secession and sided with the Confederacy as the Civil War broke out. However, separation from the Union did not last long; the city's harbor was blockaded by the federal navy starting in July 1861, followed by a full-scale occupation after the Battle of Galveston Harbor in October 1862. However, at the Battle of Galveston in January 1863, a small Confederate force managed to overwhelm the Union's naval forces in the bay and retake the island. Despite this victory, the Union continued to blockade the outlets of Galveston Bay until the end of the war. Reconstruction was swift in southeast Texas. Ranching interests were major economic drivers on the mainland in the 19th century. The city of Galveston became a major U.S. commercial center for shipping cotton, leather products, cattle, and other goods produced in the growing state. Railroads were built around the shore, and new communities continued to emerge.

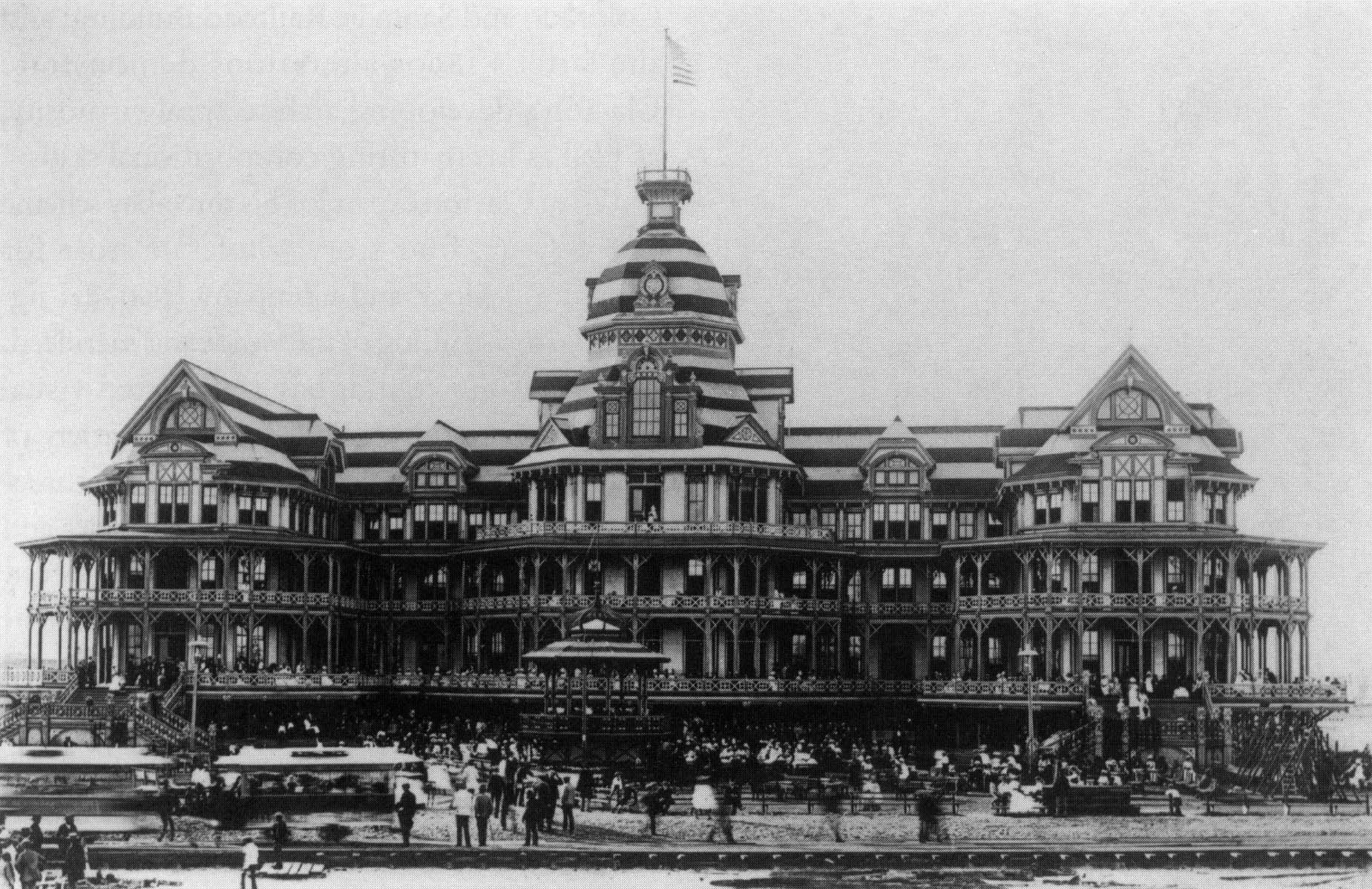
The Beach Hotel, a famous 19th century Galveston resort

The Galveston Hurricane of 1900 devastated the city of Galveston and heavily damaged communities around the bay. Growth moved inland to Houston, as fear of the risks posed by establishing businesses at Galveston limited the island's ability to compete. Texas City emerged as another important port in the area. Shipping traffic through the bay expanded dramatically after the federal government completed the dredging of the Houston Ship Channel to a depth of 25 feet (7.6 m) in 1914. The Texas oil boom began in 1901, and by 1915, oil production by the bay was fully underway. Oil wells and refineries quickly developed throughout the area. After frozen transport became available in the 1920s, commercial fishing developed as a substantial industry, producing particularly oysters, finfish, and, later, shrimp. By the end of the 1930s, the Port of Houston was the largest cotton port and the third largest port by overall tonnage in the United States.

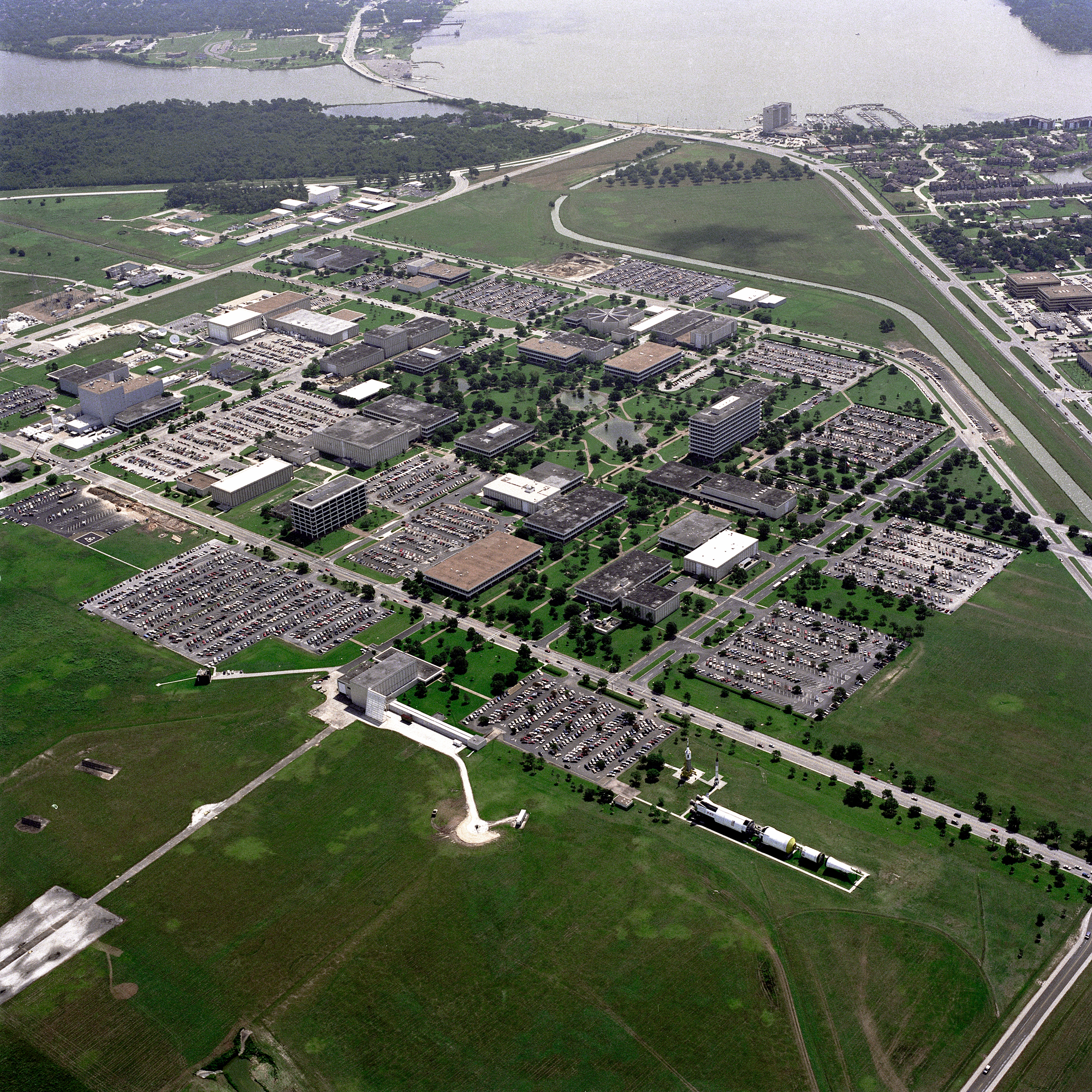
NASA Johnson Space Center, with Clear Lake visible at the top of the image

The establishment of NASA's Johnson Space Center near the bay in the Clear Lake Area in 1963 brought new growth. By the 1970s Houston had become one of the nation's largest cities, and its expansion connected it with the bay communities. The bay's shoreline became heavily urbanized and industrialized, leading to pollution of the bay. In the 1970s the bay was described by U.S. Representative Robert C. Eckhardt as "the most polluted body of water in the U.S." The ship channel and Clear Lake were rated by the Galveston Bay Estuary Program as having even worse water quality.

Extraction of oil and groundwater, as well as large wakes from increasing shipping in the bay, led to land subsidence and erosion along the shoreline, especially in the Baytown–Pasadena area. Over the past few decades, approximately 100 acres (40 ha) of the historic San Jacinto battleground has been submerged; Sylvan Beach, a popular destination in La Porte, has been severely eroded, and the once prominent Brownwood neighborhood of Baytown has been abandoned. Today, the bay is a major destination for recreational and tourist activities, including boating, ecotourism, and waterfowl hunting.

=== Incidents ===
==== 2019 cargo plane crash ====
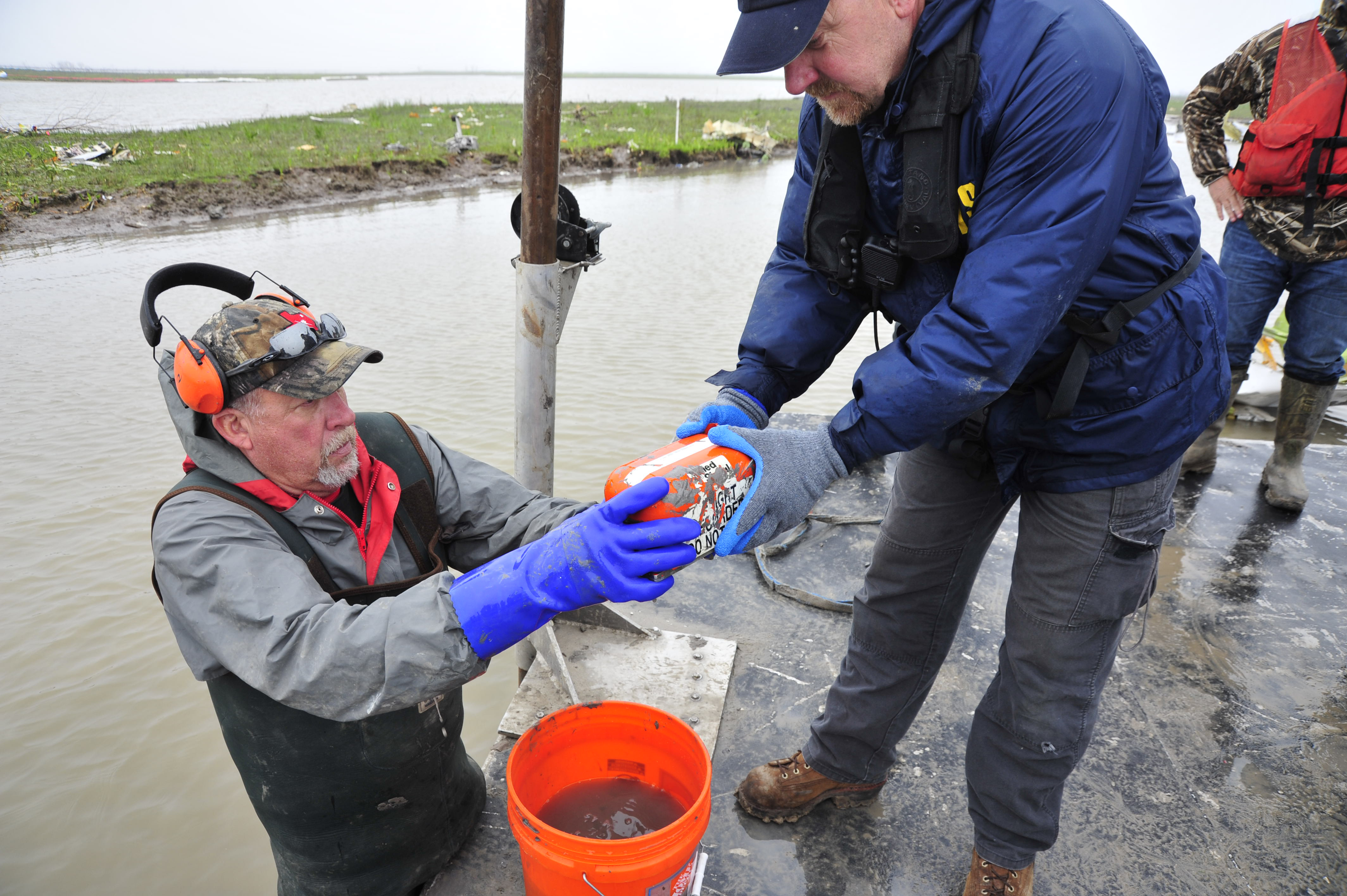
NTSB investigators recover the flight data recorder from Trinity Bay

Atlas Air Flight 3591 was a scheduled domestic cargo flight under the Amazon Air banner between Miami International Airport and George Bush Intercontinental Airport in Houston. On February 23, 2019, the Boeing 767-375ER(BCF) crashed into Trinity Bay near Anahuac, Texas, killing both crew members and a passenger, at approximately 12:45 CST (18:45 UTC). Shortly before impact the aircraft made a sharp turn south before going into a rapid descent. Witnesses described the plane as going into a nosedive and thunderous sounds before it crashed.

Investigators from the Federal Aviation Administration (FAA), Federal Bureau of Investigation (FBI), and National Transportation Safety Board (NTSB) were deployed to the scene while dive teams from the Texas Department of Public Safety, Houston, and Baytown police departments located the aircraft's flight recorders. The NTSB later determined that the crash was a result of the first officer's inappropriate response to an inadvertent activation of the airplane's go-around mode, resulting in his spatial disorientation that led him to place the airplane in a steep descent from which the crew did not recover in time from.

==== 2024 oil spill and partial bridge collapse ====
On May 15, 2024, a tugboat leaving Texas International Terminals, a container terminal next to the Pelican Island causeway, the only bridge connecting Pelican Island to the rest of Galveston, lost control of two barges it was pushing. One of the barges, operated by Martin Operating Partnership, then hit the bridge and two telephone poles at approximately 10:00 CDT (3:00 GMT) collapsing a portion of the bridge, causing a diesel fuel spill, and causing a temporary power outage on the island. Two people were knocked off of the barge or jumped off, but they were quickly rescued. As a result of the collision, the bridge was closed. The barge, which reportedly has a capacity of 30,000 U.S. gal (110,000 L), spilled between 1,000 U.S. gal (3,800 L) and 2,000 U.S. gal (7,600 L) of oil into Galveston Bay. Some spilled oil stayed on top of the barge and did not leak into the water.

An approximate 6.5 mi (10.5 km) span of the Gulf Intracoastal Waterway was shut down around the bridge in order to help crews clean up the oil spill. Galveston County officials began evacuations for the approximately 200 people who were on the island at the time of the collapse for anyone who needed to leave the island, but warned that they would be unlikely to be able to return in the near future.

== Features ==
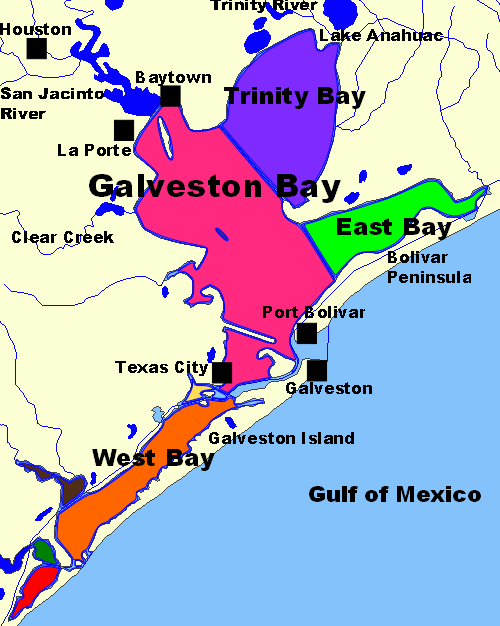
Galveston Bay (magenta), Trinity Bay (purple), East Bay (green), West Bay (orange)

Galveston Bay covers approximately 600 square miles (1,600 km^{2}), and is 30 miles (48 km) long and 17 miles (27 km) wide. The bay has an average depth of 6 feet (2 m) and a maximum undredged depth of 10 feet (3 m). The Galveston Bay system consists of four main bodies of water: Galveston Bay proper (upper and lower), Trinity Bay, East Bay, and West Bay. The bay is bordered by three counties: Chambers, Harris, and Galveston. Significant communities around the bay include Houston, Pasadena, League City, Baytown, Texas City, Galveston, La Porte, Seabrook, and Anahuac.

Galveston Bay has three outlets to the Gulf of Mexico: Bolivar Roads between Galveston Island and the Bolivar Peninsula, San Luis Pass at the west end of Galveston Island, and Rollover Pass across Bolivar Peninsula. Many smaller bays and lakes are connected to the main system, including Christmas Bay, Moses Lake, Dickinson Bay, Clear Lake, Ash Lake, Black Duck Bay, and San Jacinto Bay. Together with its extensions, Galveston Bay forms the largest of the seven major estuaries along the Gulf Coast of Texas. The Gulf Intracoastal Waterway, an inland waterway consisting of natural watercourses and man-made canals, runs between the bay and the Gulf. A majority of the bay's inflow comes from the Trinity River, which contributes 7,500,000 acre-feet (9.3×10^{9} m^{3}) of freshwater annually. The San Jacinto River contributes another 500,000 acre-feet (620,000,000 m^{3}). Local coastal watersheds contribute the remainder.

=== Climate ===
The climate around the Bay is classified as humid subtropical (Cfa in Köppen climate classification system). Prevailing winds from the south and southeast bring heat from the deserts of Mexico and moisture from the Gulf of Mexico. Summer temperatures regularly exceed 90 °F (32 °C), and the area's humidity drives the heat index even higher. Winters in the area are mild, with typical January highs above 60 °F (16 °C) and lows above 40 °F (4 °C). Snowfall is generally rare. Annual rainfall is ample and averages well over 45 inches (1,100 mm), with some areas typically receiving over 60 inches (1,500 mm).

Hurricanes are an ever-present threat during the fall season. Galveston Island and the Bolivar Peninsula are generally at the greatest risk. However, though the island and the peninsula provide some shielding, the bay shoreline still faces significant danger from storm surge. Hurricane Ike, the most economically and environmentally destructive event on the bay since 1900, struck in 2008. A proposal to build a flood barrier system to prevent against future storm surge, the so-called Ike Dike, has been considered by the state government. In August 2017, the Galveston Bay Area was struck by Hurricane Harvey and received an extraordinary amount of rainfall in a matter of days, with many locations in the bay area observing more than 30 in (760 mm) of precipitation during the storm.

== Ecosystem ==
The complex mixing of waters from different sources provides nursery and spawning grounds for many types of marine life including crabs, shrimp, oysters, and many varieties of fish, thereby supporting a substantial fishing industry. The deeper navigation channels of the bay provide suitable habitats for bottlenose dolphins, which feed on the abundant fish varieties. Additionally, the bayous, rivers, and marshes that ring the bay support their own collection of ecosystems, containing diverse wildlife and enabling freshwater farming of crawfish.

The wetlands that surround the bay support a variety of fauna. Notable terrestrial species include the American alligator and the bobcat, while bird species include the roseate spoonbill, great and snowy egret, white-faced ibis, and mottled duck.

=== Pollution ===
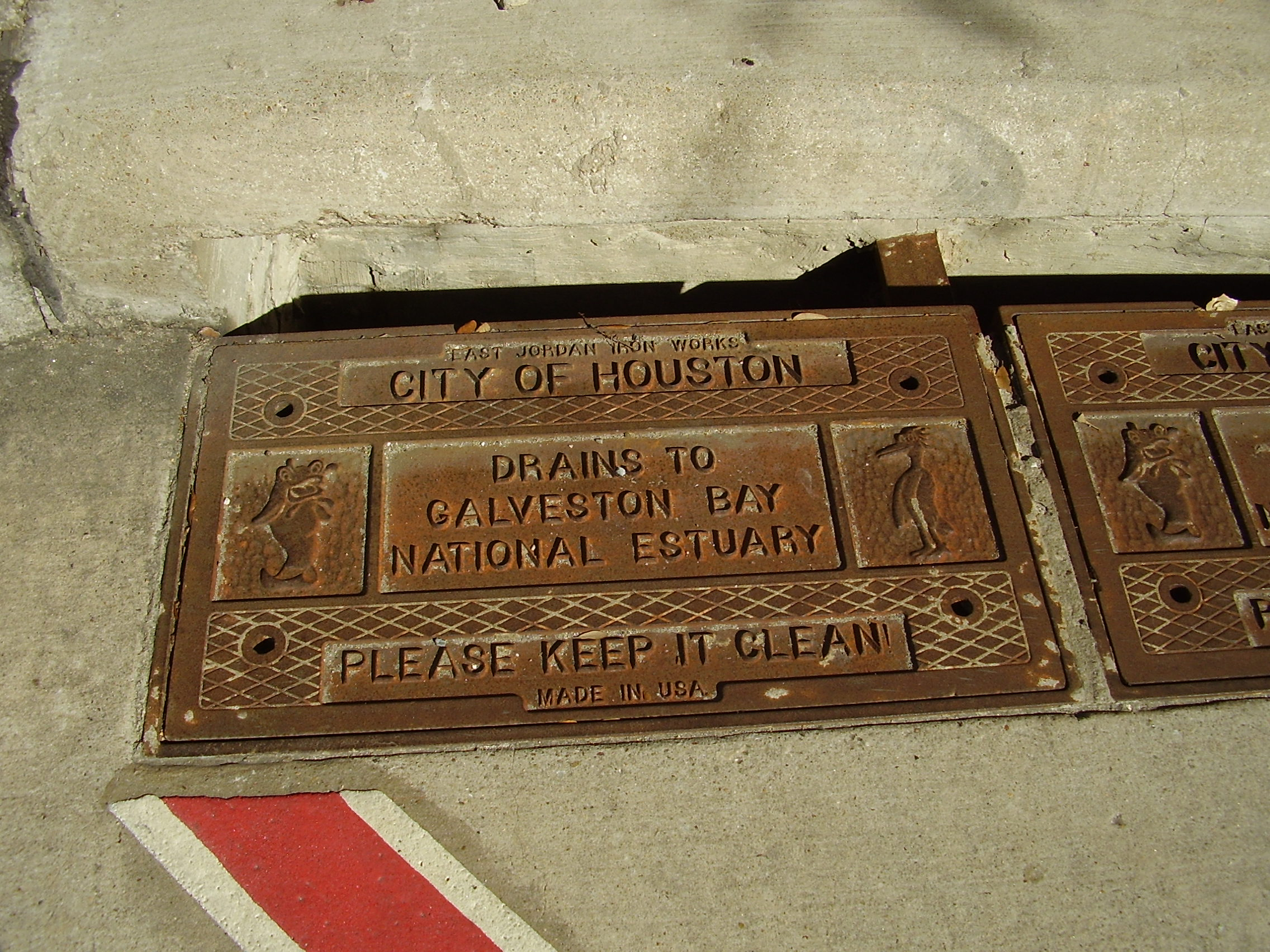
City of Houston storm drains lead into Galveston Bay; messages ask people to keep the ecosystem in mind.

In the early 1990s, the Houston Ship Channel had the fifth highest level of toxic chemicals in the nation due to industrial discharge, with over 18.2 million pounds (8,300,000 kg) discharged between 1990 and 1994. However, the bay has generally experienced improving water quality since the passage of the Clean Water Act in 1972. The Houston Area Research Council (HARC) and Galveston Bay Foundation periodically release the Galveston Bay Report Card, which grades a number of metrics indicative of the health of the bay's ecosystem and waters. The 2019 report assigned a "C" grade for toxins in bay sediments, citing water and soil pollution, wildlife habitat loss, and the impacts of climate change as challenges facing the estuary. The presence of the San Jacinto Pits Superfund site in the Houston Ship Channel, which contains large amounts of dioxins, is considered a significant threat to the bay's health. The entire bay is covered by seafood consumption advisories set by the Texas Department of State Health Services, but the strictness of these standards varies by location. In the Ship Channel, advisories recommend against the consumption of all fish and blue crab, while in the lower bay, advisories only apply to catfish.

Oil spills are a routine consequence of the industrial activity around Galveston Bay, with hundreds of spills taking place in a typical year. On March 22, 2014, a barge carrying marine fuel oil collided with another ship in the Houston Ship Channel, causing the contents of one of the barge's 168,000-US-gallon (640,000 L) tanks to leak into the bay, requiring weeks of cleanup by dozens of boats. Excessive ozone levels can occur due to industrial activities; nearby Houston is ranked among the most ozone-polluted cities in the United States. The industries located along the ship channel are a major cause of ozone pollution.

== Industry ==
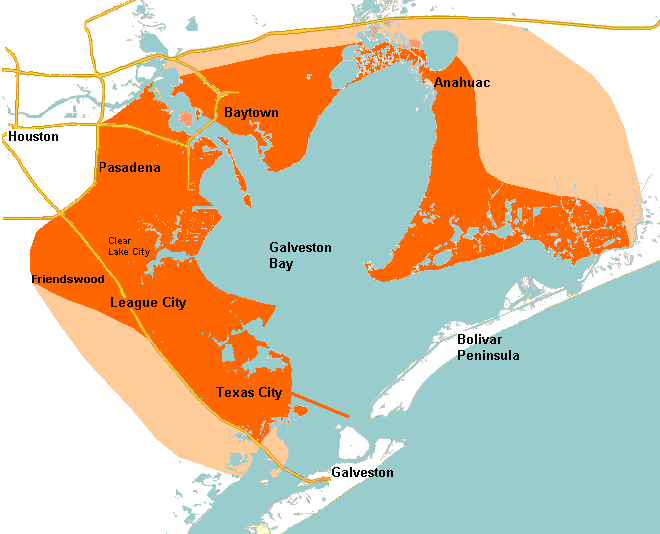
Galveston Bay Area municipalities

Galveston Bay is located in Greater Houston, which is the fifth largest metropolitan area in the United States, and home to one of the nation's most significant shipping centers. Houston, the nation's fourth largest city, is the economic and cultural center of the region. Important ports served by the bay include the Port of Houston, the Port of Texas City, and the Port of Galveston. The Houston Ship Channel, which connects the Port of Houston to the Gulf, passes through the bay. It is a partially man-made feature created by dredging the Buffalo Bayou, the ship channel subbays, and Galveston Bay.

The area has a broad industrial base including the energy, manufacturing, aeronautics, transportation, and health care sectors. The bayside communities in particular are home to the Johnson Space Center, which houses the Christopher C. Kraft Jr. Mission Control Center, Ellington Field Joint Reserve Base, Ellington Airport (home of the Houston Spaceport), and a high concentration of petrochemical refineries.

A large commercial fishing industry has grown around Galveston Bay, with significant production of shrimp, blue crab, eastern oyster, black drum, flounder, sheepshead, and snapper. In 2012, the commercial fish harvest in Galveston Bay amounted to 5,800,000 pounds (2,600,000 kg), with a wholesale value of roughly $16.4 million.

Galveston Bay supports a significant recreation and tourism industry, especially as a result of its proximity to major population centers. Over 40% of Greater Houston residents participate annually in hiking and swimming along the bay, while 20% go fishing and 15% go boating. The five counties surrounding the bay are home to 88,000 registered pleasure crafts. Fishing expenditures (such as the purchase of fishing bait or lodging) along Galveston Bay and Sabine Lake generate approximately $650 million annually. The recreational fishing industry supports over 3,000 jobs in the bay area.

With over 600 species of birds, Galveston Bay is a popular destination for birdwatching. This sort of ecotourism generates millions in annual revenue for Chambers County, which is home to the Jocelyn Nungaray National Wildlife Refuge (formerly Anahuac National Wildlife Refuge) and High Island.

== See also ==
- List of bays of the Houston area
