= Big Bay Dam =

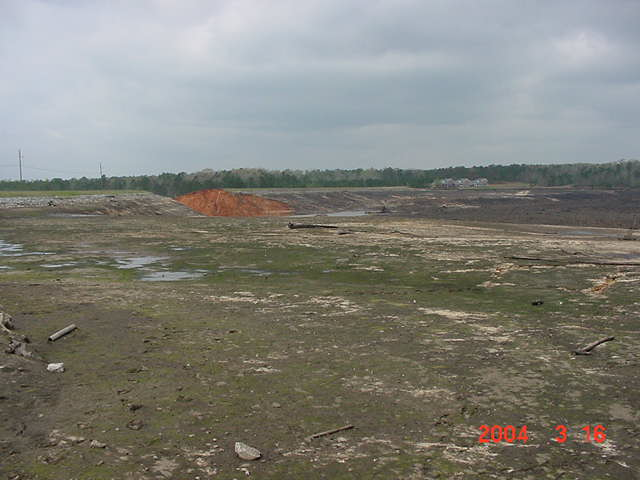
- The breach is clearly visible in this NOAA photograph.
- Interactive map of Big Bay Dam
- Country: United States
- Location: Lamar County, Mississippi
- Coordinates: 31.1826°N 89.5712°W
- Purpose: Multi-purpose
- Status: Operational
- Construction began: 1990; 36 years ago
- Opening date: 1991; 35 years ago
- Demolition date: March 12, 2004; 22 years ago (failed)
- Construction cost: $6.2 million (reconstruction)

Dam and spillways
- Type of dam: Earth fill dam
- Impounds: Bay Creek
- Height (foundation): 57 feet (17 m)
- Length: 2,000 feet (610 m)
- Elevation at crest: 284 feet (87 m)
- Width (crest): 40 feet (12 m)
- Width (base): 363 feet (111 m)
- Dam volume: 74,000 cubic yards (57,000 m^{3})

Reservoir
- Creates: Big Bay Lake
- Total capacity: 21,375 acre-feet (26,366,000 m^{3})
- Surface area: 945 acres (382 ha)

Big Bay Dam was an earthen dam located 11 miles (18 km) west of Purvis, Mississippi in Lamar County. On March 12, 2004 the Big Bay dam embankment failed through piping in the vicinity of the principal spillway 12 years after construction. A peak breach flow of 147,000 ft^{3}/s (4,200 m^{3}/s) was estimated from the breach geometry, breach timing and the reservoir volume. The Big Bay embankment, which is largely intact, is approximately 1,890 feet (580 m) long and 51.3 feet (15.6 m) high. The failure occurred with an initial water surface about 6 inches (150 mm) above the normal pool elevation of 278.0 ft (84.7 m), releasing 14,200 acre-feet (17,500,000 m^{3}) of water and inundating 14.3 miles (23.0 km) of valley to depths of up to 33 ft (10 m) from the dam to the Pearl River. Woody material was stripped from the stream valley for a length of 2,300 ft (700 m) immediately below the dam, after which velocities decreased to such an extent that little vegetation was uprooted.

The inundation impacted Bay Creek and Lower Little Creek in Lamar and Marion Counties. A damage assessment indicated that, within Lamar County, 26 homes were destroyed, 8 homes had major damage, 8 homes had minor damage, 25 mobile homes were destroyed and 1 mobile home had minor damage. In Marion County, 1 home was destroyed, 13 homes had major damage, 12 homes had minor damage, 1 mobile home was destroyed, 3 mobile homes had major damage, 3 mobile homes had minor damage, Pine Burr Church suffered major damage, Hub Chapel Church had minor damage, and the Pinebur Volunteer Fire Department suffered major damage. In all, 104 structures were documented as damaged or destroyed. There were no deaths.

The dam breach characteristics, specifically the breach geometry and formation time, were estimated by Yochum et al. 2008. The breach width was measured to be 230 ft (70 m), with a top width of 315 ft (96 m), right side slope of 0.61 and a left side slope of 1.3 (horizontal/vertical). In regard to the breach timing, increased discharge from a pre-existing seep was first noticed on Thursday, March 11, 2004. The seep gradually increased its discharge, with the flow carrying material by the next morning. At mid-morning on March 12, 2004 the seep was inspected and was noticed that it had about a ½ inch of head height. By 12:15 water “shot up out of the hole”. Shortly after this the seep was observed to be “spouting approximately 2 to 3 ft (0.61 to 0.91 m) in height, with a diameter of about 18 inches (460 mm)”. The area around the boil then collapsed and the embankment began to rapidly erode. This is the point where the breach is assumed to start, at about 12:20. The final breach dimensions occurred from about 13:10. Full formation is assumed to occur at 13:15—the breach formation time is estimated to be 55 minutes.

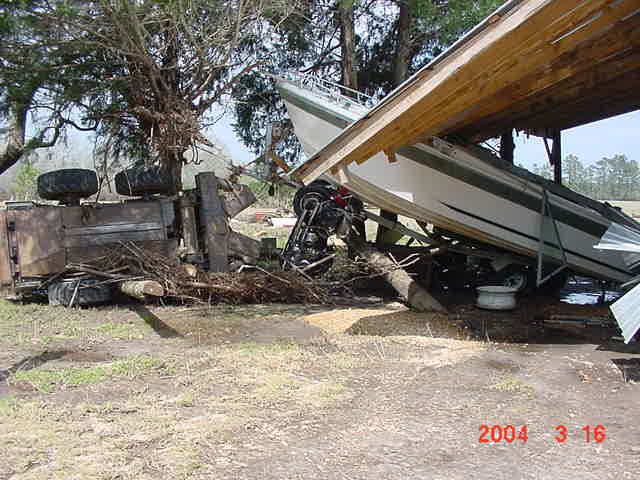
Another NOAA photo shows some damage caused by the flood.
