= Whitewater Bay =

Bay in Monroe County, Florida, United States

Coordinates: 25°17′08″N 80°59′34″W

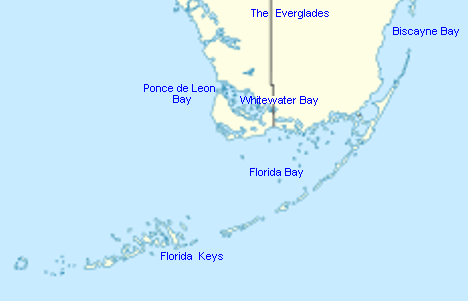
Map of South Florida waterways

Whitewater Bay is an inlet of the Gulf of Mexico in southwestern Florida in the United States. The bay is located entirely within Monroe County north of Cape Sable in the Everglades National Park. Whitewater Bay leads into Oyster Bay to the west, then Ponce de Leon Bay in the Gulf of Mexico. Hells Bay is nearby.
