= Little Bay (Newfoundland and Labrador) =

Coordinates: 47.649°N 55.237°W

Little Bay is a natural bay on the island of Newfoundland in the province of Newfoundland and Labrador, Canada.
