= USS Floyds Bay =

Tender of the United States Navy

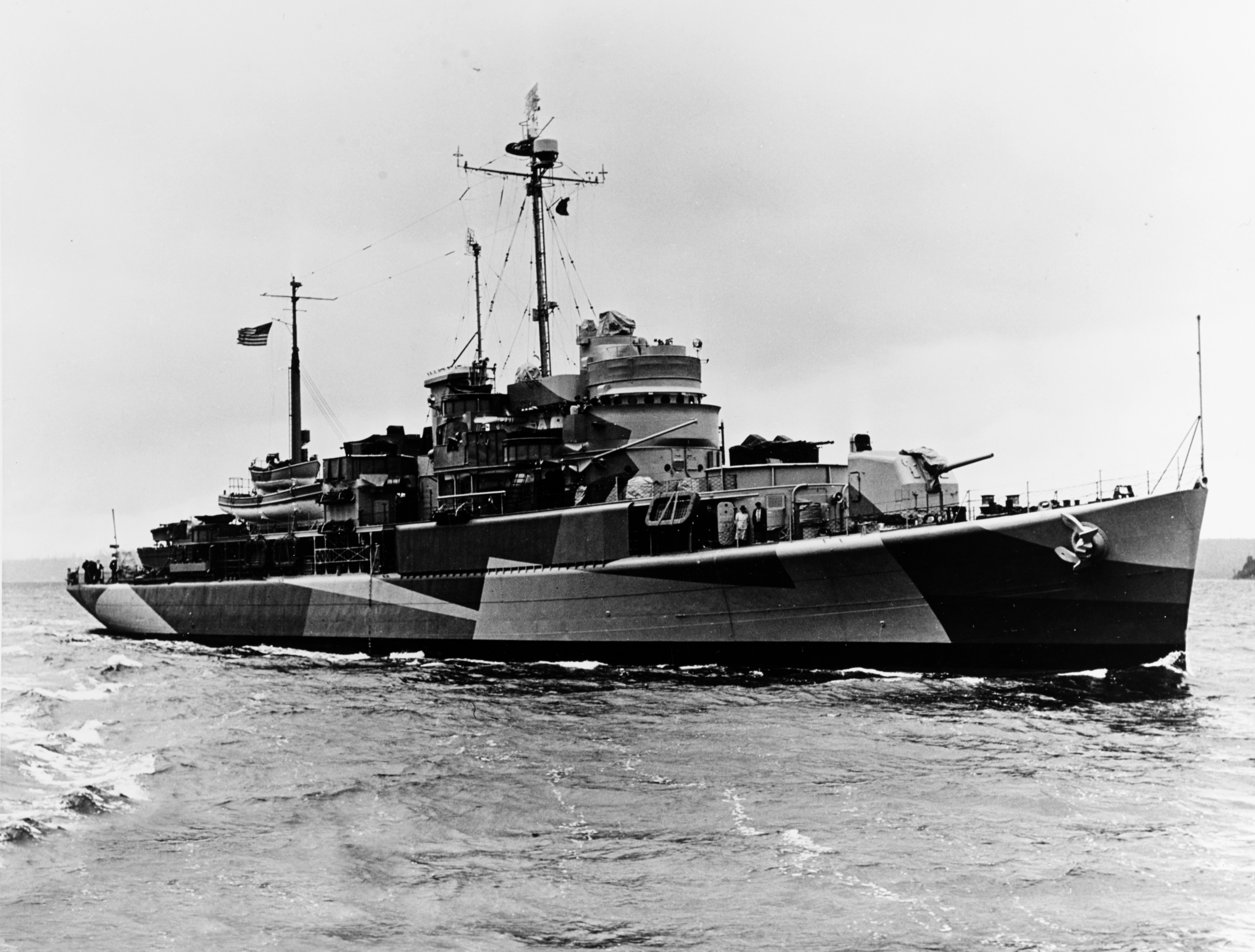
- USS Floyds Bay (AVP-40) off Houghton, Washington on 22 March 1945.

History

United States
- Name: USS Floyds Bay
- Namesake: Floyds Bay, since renamed Burtons Bay, on the coast of Virginia
- Builder: Lake Washington Shipyard, Houghton, Washington
- Laid down: 16 May 1944
- Launched: 28 January 1945
- Sponsored by: Mrs. R. R. McCracken
- Commissioned: 26 March 1945
- Decommissioned: 26 February 1960
- Stricken: 1 March 1960
- Honors and awards: One battle star for World War II service; One battle star for Korean War service
- Fate: Sold 20 July 1960

General characteristics
- Class & type: USS Floyds Bay
- Type: Barnegat-class small seaplane tender
- Displacement: 1,766 tons (light); 2,750 tons (full load)
- Length: 310 ft 9 in (94.72 m)
- Beam: 41 ft 1 in (12.52 m)
- Draught: 13 ft 6 in (4.11 m)
- Installed power: 6,000 horsepower (4.48 megawatts)
- Propulsion: Diesel engines, two shafts
- Speed: 18.6 knots (34.4 km/h)
- Complement: 215 (ship's company); 367 (including aviation unit)
- Sensors & processing systems: Radar; sonar
- Armament: 1 × single 5 in (130 mm) 38-caliber dual-purpose gun mount; 1 × quad 40-mm antiaircraft gun mount; 2 × dual 40-mm antiaircraft gun mounts; 4 × dual 20-mm antiaircraft gun mounts; 2 × depth charge tracks
- Aviation facilities: Supplies, spare parts, repairs, and berthing for one seaplane squadron; 80,000 US gallons (300,000 L) aviation fuel

USS Floyds Bay (AVP-40) was a United States Navy Barnegat-class small seaplane tender in commission from 1945 to 1960 that saw service in World War II and the Korean War.

== Construction and commissioning ==
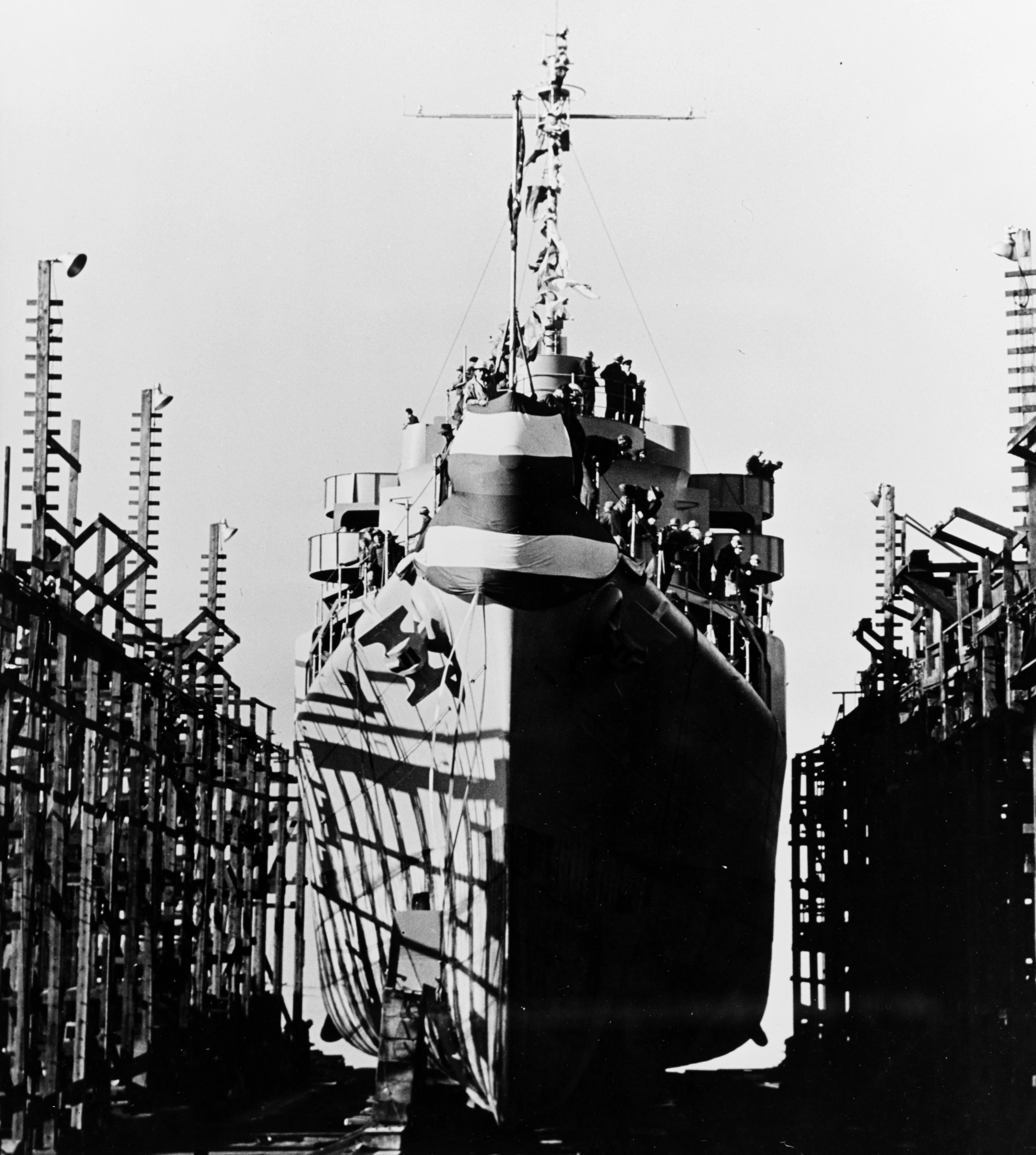
USS Floyds Bay (AVP-40) is launched at Lake Washington Shipyard at Houghton, Washington on 28 January 1945.

Floyds Bay (AVP-40) was laid down at Lake Washington Shipyard at Houghton, Washington. She was launched on 28 January 1945, sponsored by Mrs. R. R. McCracken, and commissioned on 25 March 1945.

== World War II operations 1945 ==
After training at Pearl Harbor, Hawaii, and in the Mariana Islands, Floyds Bay arrived at Okinawa on 28 July 1945 to operate with Air-Sea Rescue Squadron 6 and other seaplanes. She was on these duties when World War II ended with the cessation of hostilities with Japan on 15 August 1945.

=== Honors and awards ===
Floyds Bay received one battle star for her World War II service.

== Peacetime operations 1945–1950 ==
Floyds Bay continued her duties at Okinawa until 9 September 1945. From that time, she controlled seadromes at Wakanoura Wan and Nagoya in Japan and at Shanghai and Tsingtao, China. She concluded her post-World War II occupation duties when she departed Yokohama, Japan, on 1 December 1946 bound for San Francisco, California.

From her home port, San Diego, California, Floyds Bay sailed on a round-the-world good-will cruise between 6 June 1947 and 27 March 1948. Proceeding eastward, she called at Mediterranean and Far Eastern ports, operating in Japanese waters for several months.

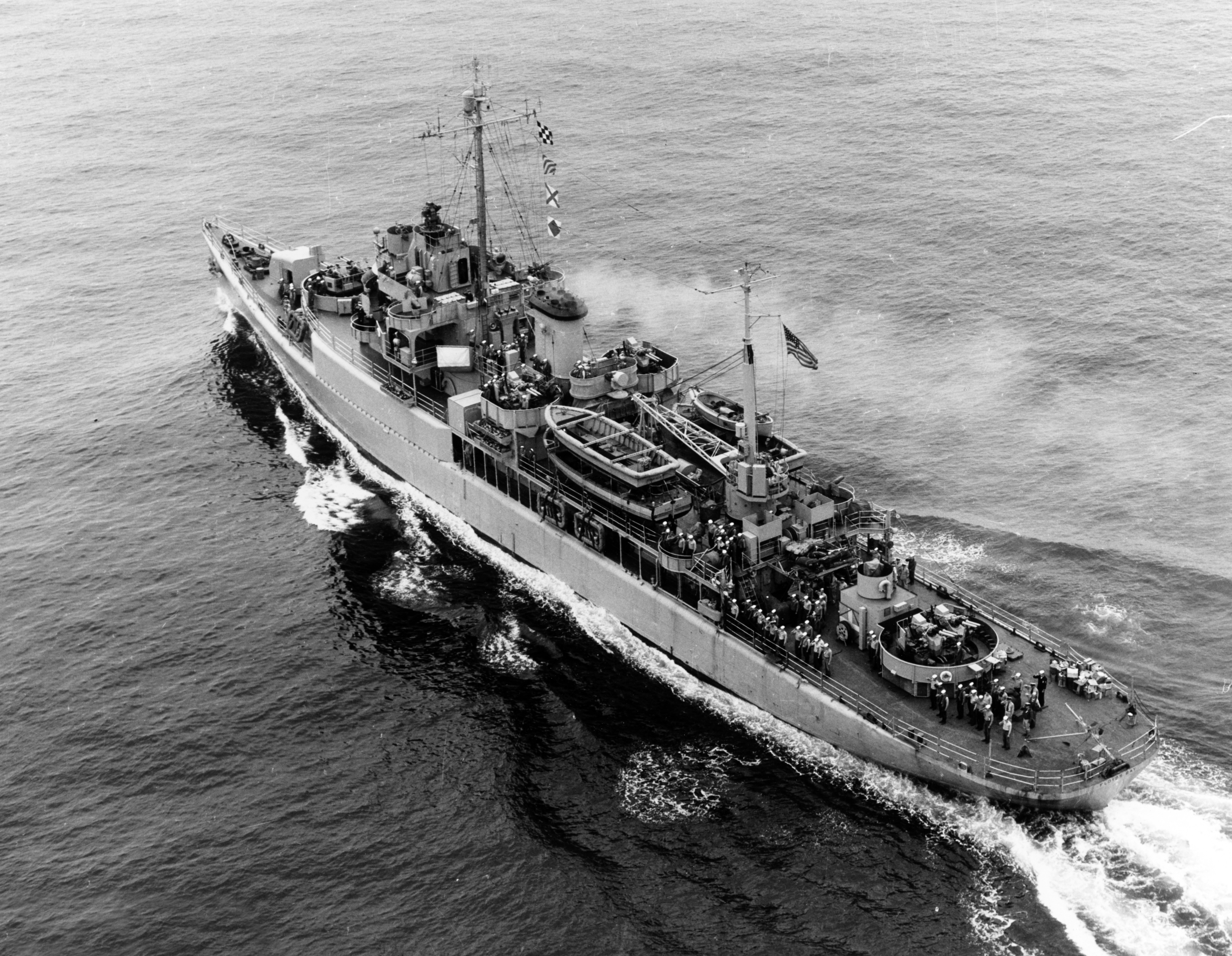
USS Floyds Bay sometime between the installation of a quad 40-millimeter antiaircraft gun mount on her fantail ca. 1948 and its removal ca. 1956.

In the summer of 1948, Floyds Bay served as tender for seaplanes flying photographic missions from Annette Island, Alaska. During the summer of 1949, she carried out important assignments at Hong Kong, when she served as communications base for diplomatic officials, and maintained a seadrome for the evacuation of Americans from Communist-threatened Canton, China, during the Chinese Civil War.

== Korean War 1950–1953 and peacetime operations 1953–1959 ==
Annually from 1950 through 1959, Floyds Bay had tours of duty in the Far East. She served as a seaplane tender at Iwakuni, Japan, during the Korean War (1950–1953), and often as station ship at Hong Kong. With these cruises she alternated duty on the United States West Coast, which took her from Mexico to Alaska.

=== Honors and awards ===
Floyds Bay received one battle star for her Korean War service.

== Decommissioning and disposal ==
On 26 February 1960, Floyds Bay was decommissioned and placed in reserve at Puget Sound Naval Shipyard at Bremerton, Washington. She was stricken from the Naval Vessel Register on 1 March 1960 and sold on 20 July 1960.
