= Cape Sable =

Southernmost mainland of Florida and contiguous US

- Cape
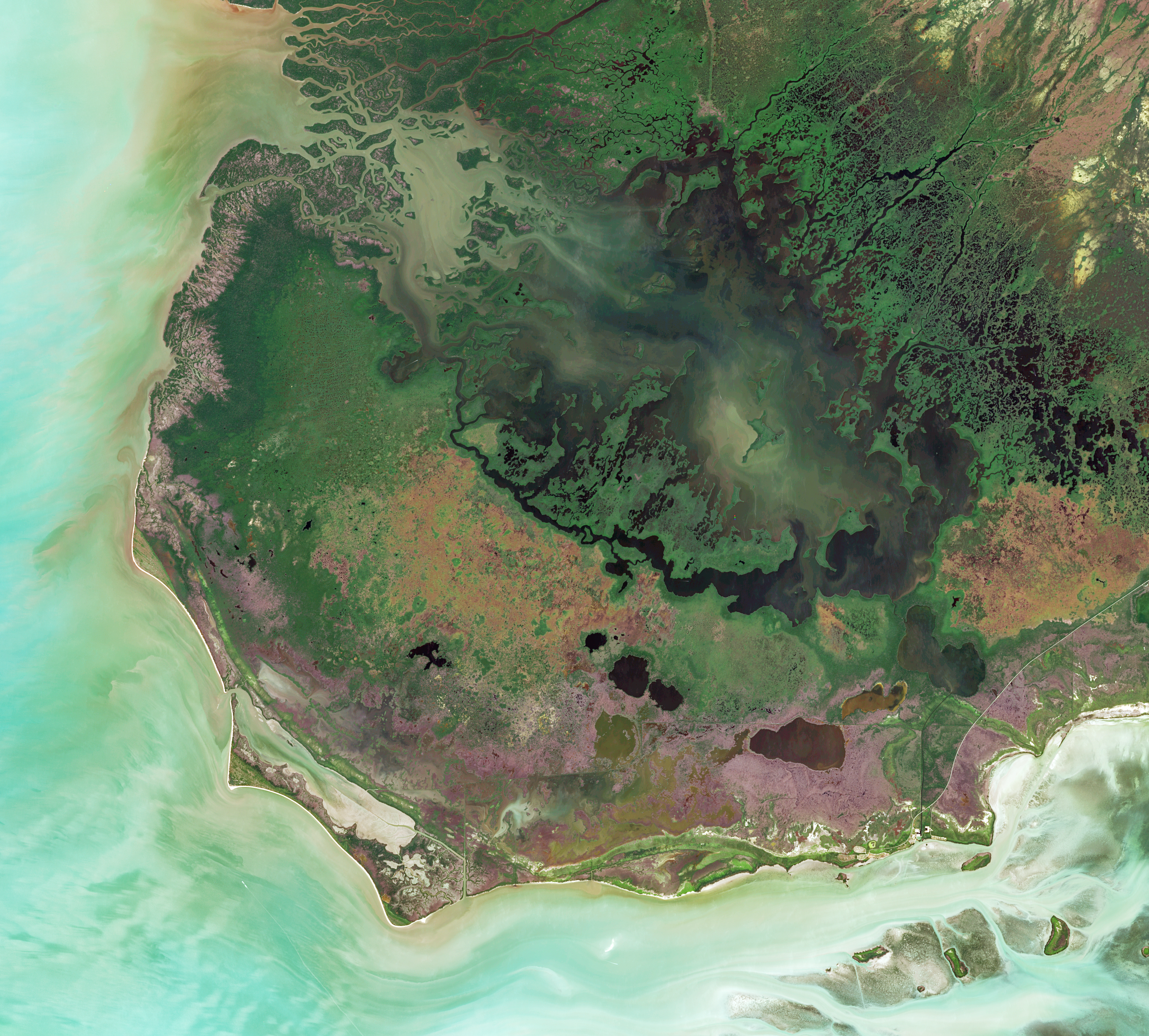
- Satellite image of Cape Sable

- Location within Florida Location within the United States
- Coordinates: 25°16′20″N 81°07′25″W
- Location: United States

Cape Sable is the southernmost point of the United States mainland and mainland Florida. It is located in southwestern Florida, in Monroe County, and is part of the Everglades National Park.

The cape is a peninsula issuing from the southeastern part of the Florida mainland, running west and curving around to the north, reaching Ponce de Leon Bay, at the mouth of the Shark River. It forms the southern and western margins of Whitewater Bay.

There are three prominent points on the cape, each of which hosts a designated backcountry campsite:

- East Cape, which is the actual southernmost point of the Florida and United States mainland and the location of Lake Ingraham, the southernmost lake in the United States of America;
- Middle Cape, also known as Palm Point; and
- Northwest Cape.

The campsites are part of the "outside route" of the Everglades Wilderness Waterway, with permits required for an overnight stay, obtained from the Flamingo Visitor Center. The cape also has many lakes and beaches.

Cape Sable is home to the mangrove diamondback terrapin (Malaclemys terrapin rhizophorarum) and the Florida gopher tortoise (Gopherus polyphemus). Before Hurricane Donna reduced their range in 1960, more than 3,000 of the now-endangered Cape Sable seaside sparrows (Ammodramus maritimus mirabilis) used the cape.

Nearly the full length of the cape facing Florida Bay and the Gulf of Mexico is a fine sand beach extending inland less than 100 yards (91 m). Behind the beach in the eastern and middle parts of the cape is a marl prairie, extending from Flamingo to approximately Northwest Point. Inland from the marl prairie, and over all of the northern part of the cape behind the beaches, is a complex of marshes and mangrove covered land. The largest lake on the cape is Lake Ingraham, which is long and narrow, running just behind the beach from near East Cape to past Middle Cape.

== History ==
There is little evidence of any extensive settlement of Cape Sable by humans. There are adequate sources of fresh water on the cape, and areas of arable land. There are a few small Indian shell mounds there. The Spanish reported a Tequesta village on the cape. The pre-Seminole tribes of south Florida did not practice agriculture, and probably used the cape as a base for fishing and hunting.

Mariners and fishermen visited Cape Sable to take on fresh water. Hunters also visited the cape, which had more wildlife than the Florida Keys. During the Second Seminole War, residents of the Florida Keys worried about Seminoles' using Cape Sable and threatening the Florida Keys. In 1840, a Seminole raiding party, which was believed to have traveled over Cape Sable, attacked and destroyed the settlement on Indian Key.

The United States government was concerned that Spanish authorities in Cuba were supplying the Seminole to support their resistance. They knew that Cuban fishermen, including the "Spanish Indians" who had been evacuated to Cuba from Florida in 1821, continued to fish along the southwest Florida coast. The United States Army established Fort Poinsett on East Cape in 1838 to discourage contacts with the Spanish and to protect the Florida Keys. This fort did not prevent the Seminole attack on Indian Key. In 1856, during the Third Seminole War, the Army established Fort Cross on Middle Cape. Traces of Fort Poinsett could be seen until it was destroyed by the Labor Day Hurricane of 1935.

The settlement of Flamingo, formed around 1892, was the only major settlement on Cape Sable. By 1900, 50 families lived in the small town. In 1905, warden and sheriff Guy Bradley was killed after confronting poachers near the town; his death, along with two others, led to the end of the commercial feather trade. In 1910, only three homes in the town were still occupied.

In 1912, Henry Flagler received 260,000 acres of land across three counties, 210,000 of which were located on or near Cape Sable. The Model Land Company (also known as the Cape Sable Land Company) was set up as a subsidiary of the Florida East Coast Railroad to manage and sell property in the area. The subsidiary president, James E. Ingraham (the railroad's vice president), had a road built from Homestead to the Cape from 1914 to 1916. This road was subsequently named the Ingraham Highway, and in 1922 would be extended to Flamingo. Along the road he also built the Homestead Canal, which extends to the Gulf of Mexico.

In 1916, the Model Land Company constructed a "Club House" on East Cape to serve as sales headquarters and hotel for prospective customers, fishermen and hunters. The building consisted of offices on 6-foot pilings with an enclosed porch on the outside for meal serving, along with six tents ("cottages") around the base that were rented for $2.50 per day ($26.52 in 2022). Each "cottage" had a wooden floor, bed, washstand, kerosene lantern, two chairs, and mosquito netting. A swimming pool was built nearby with coconut palms, along with a small bridge to Middle Cape and some small drainage ditches to make the land look more appealing.

Ultimately, only a few lots would ever be sold, and the "Club House" was destroyed around 1931 by a hurricane. In 1948 the company sold their 135,000 acres to the NPS for $115,000; the swimming pool could still be seen as late as the 1950s.

== Gallery ==
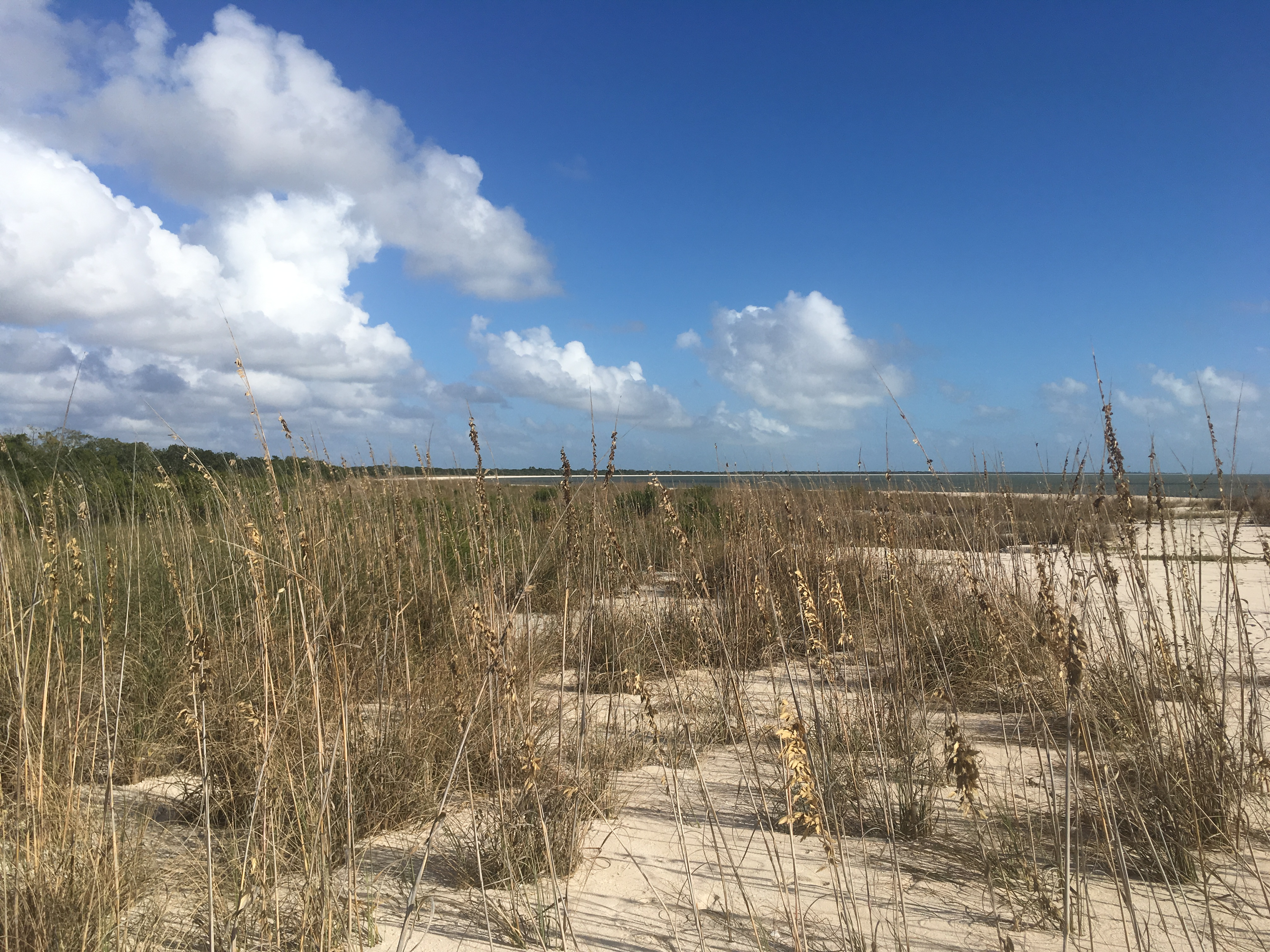
Middle Cape Sable 1/1/2019

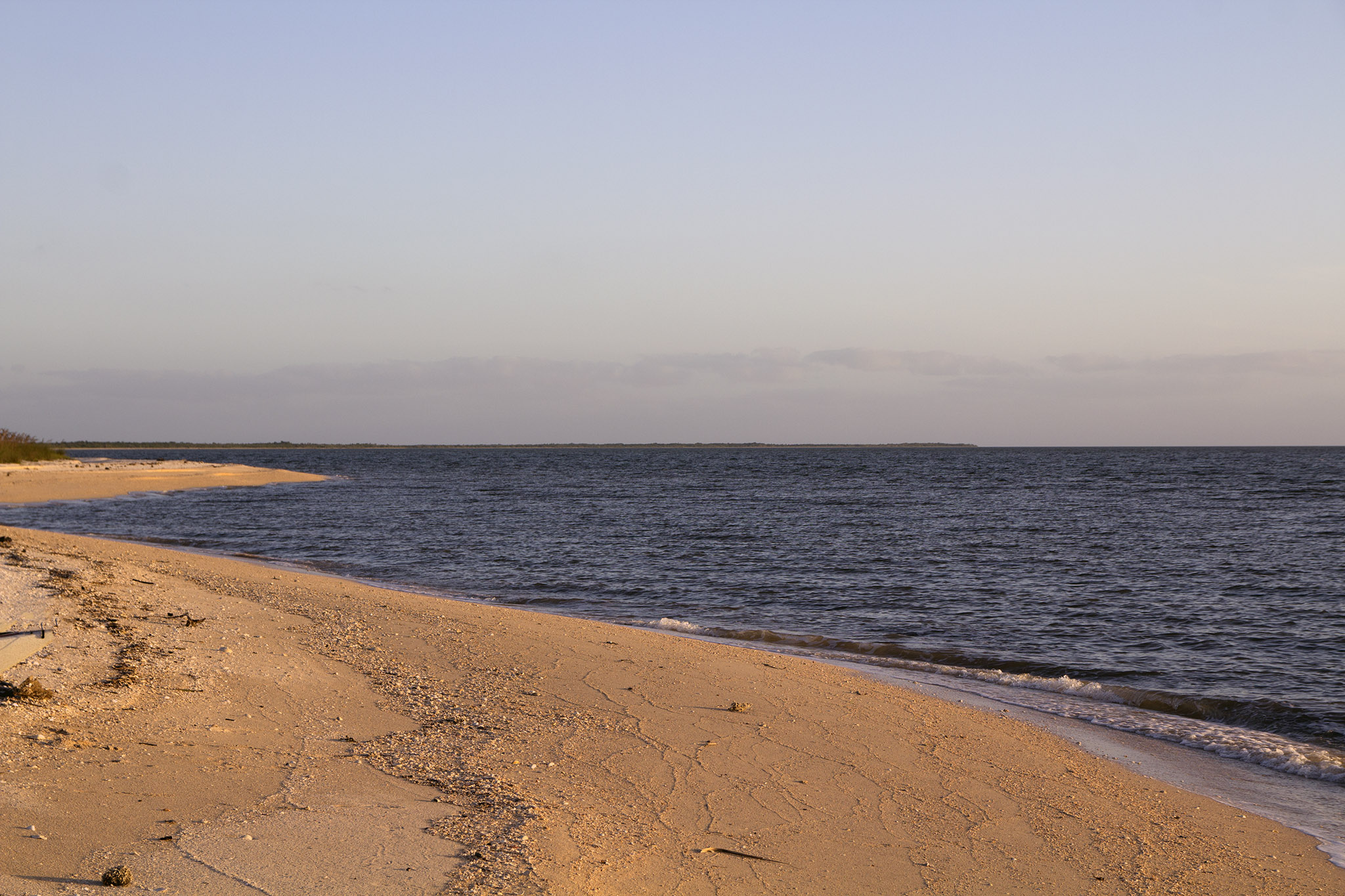
Northwest Cape overlooking Middle Cape in the distance

== Bibliography ==
- Tebeau, Charlton W. (1968). Man in the Everglades. Coral Gables, Florida: University of Miami Press.
