= Little Pike Bay =

Bay in Ontario, Canada

Coordinates: 44°54′08″N 81°21′25″W

Little Pike Bay is a bay in the Northern Bruce Peninsula, off Lake Huron in south-western Ontario, Canada. Little Pike Bay is located 50 km south of Tobermory and 60 km north of Owen Sound. The area now hosts seasonal cottages, year-round homes and seasonal tourism.

== History ==
This area of the Northern Bruce Peninsula was historically used for logging and hunting in the late 19th century. The logging business of the period required large barges to enter the relatively small bay causing ships to frequently run ashore. The most famous incident (and the main source for tourism) involved the loss of the barge Etta and the steamer Eclipse.

== 1883 shipwreck ==
On November 21, 1883, the barge Etta was being towed by the steamer Eclipse from Tobermory to Southampton. The crew logs detail a rough storm with gale force winds. The two ships were separated in the storm during the night. The Etta was cast adrift and ran ashore on Little Pike Bay beach. The sole crewmember then walked 16 miles to Wiarton to file a report with the Port Authorities. The seven crewmembers of the Eclipse all perished when the steamer capsized in Lake Huron near Pine Tree Harbour.

== Current use ==
At the turn of the 20th century, the land was cleared enough to allow for construction of permanent hunting lodges. From there land was eventually secured by private owners and turned into seasonal cottage grounds. Shipwreck enthusiasts, lured by the Etta and Eclipse disaster, have turned the small camping area into a tourist destination.

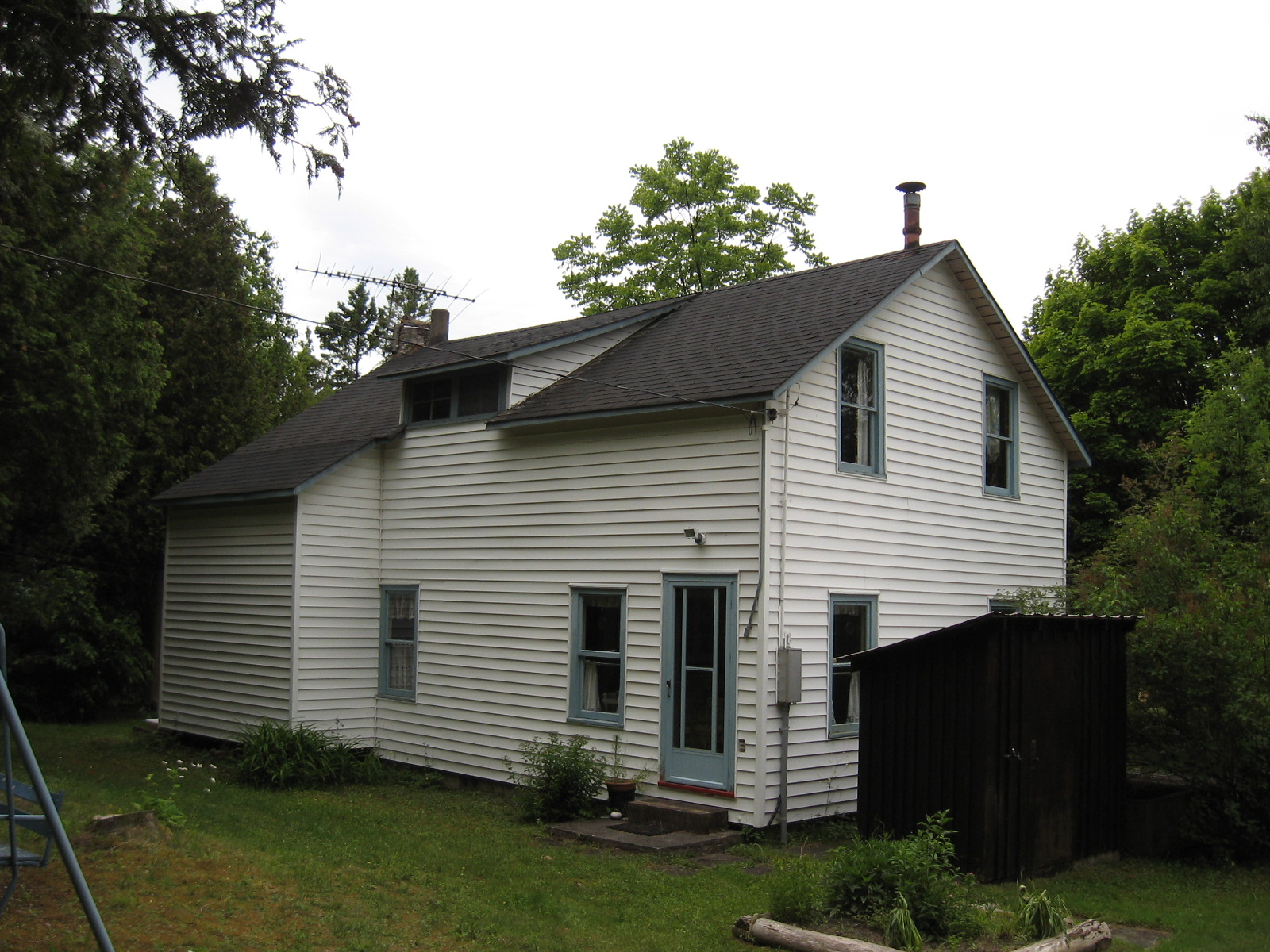
Oldest permanent structure at the bay. Built circa 1890.
