= Pigeon Hill Bay =

Bay in Maine, U.S.

Coordinates: 44°26′N 67°53′W

Pigeon Hill Bay is a bay in Washington County, Maine.

Divided between the towns of Milbridge and Steuben, it is separated from the Gulf of Maine to the east by Bois Bubert Island and from Dyer Bay to the west by Petit Manan Point. The bay extends roughly 6 mi. (10 km) and is 1 mi. (2 km) at its widest.
