= Dyer Bay =

Bay in Maine, USA

Coordinates: 44°26′N 67°55′W

Dyer Bay is a bay in Steuben, Maine.

It is separated from Pigeon Hill Bay to the east by Petit Manan Point, and from Gouldsboro Bay to the west by Dyer Neck. The bay extends roughly 6 mi. (10 km) and is 1 mi. (2 km) at its widest.
