= Burtons Bay =

Coordinates: 37°37′30″N 75°38′29″W

Burtons Bay, formerly named Floyds Bay, is a bay on the coast of Virginia in the United States.

The United States Navy seaplane tender USS Floyds Bay, in commission from 1945 to 1960, was named for the bay when it was known as Floyds Bay.
