= Little Machias Bay =

Coordinates: 44°39′N 67°16′W

Little Machias Bay is a bay in Cutler, Washington County, Maine, United States. It extends roughly 2.5 mi. by 1.5 mi. (4 km by 3 km).
