= Little Kennebec Bay =

Bay in Maine, United States

Coordinates: 44°38′N 67°26′W

Little Kennebec Bay is a bay on the coast of Maine. Located in Washington County, between Roque Bluffs and Machiasport, it extends roughly 5 mi. (8 km) inland and is 1.5 mi. (3 km) at its widest.
