= Ray Hill (American activist) =

American radio host and activist (1940–2018)

- Hill in 2018
- Born: October 13, 1940; Houston, Texas, US
- Died: November 24, 2018 (aged 78); Houston, Texas, US
- Occupations: Gay rights activist; prison reform activist; actor; radio host

Ray Hill (October 13, 1940 – November 24, 2018) was an American activist for LGBT rights and for police, law enforcement and prisoner issues. An ex-convict, he was also the subject of multiple documentary films.

== Personal life ==
=== Early life ===
Ray Hill was born on October 13, 1940, at Baptist Memorial Hospital in downtown Houston when the family was living in Houston Heights. Hill had a brother, who died before Ray was born, and two sisters. Both of Hill's parents were labor organizers, his father with the AFL–CIO and his mother with the Teamsters, which Hill says is what started his fervent interest in civil rights. Hill was a teenage Baptist evangelist from age 13 to 17.

Hill attended Galena Park High School in Houston, where he was quarterback of the football team. Hill came out to his family in 1958 while he was still in high school. His mother told him that she was "relieved" that he was gay because she and his father had thought that he was possibly a Republican. From age 18 Hill was involved in activism, and for a while served as the secretary for the NAACP chapter in Houston.

Hill attended Stephen F. Austin State University, University of Houston, and Tulane University, but did not graduate from any of these universities.

=== Prison sentence ===
Hill was sentenced to 160 years in prison for burglary in 1971: Twenty eight-year sentences to be served consecutively (he had to complete one sentence before he began the next). However, on appeal his sentence was changed so he served all eight sentences concurrently (at the same time); he was released in 1975 for good behavior, after serving only four years, four months and five days. Hill was imprisoned in the Ramsey Unit, where he worked as a maintenance bookkeeper.

=== Later life ===
In 2016, Hill stated he had had seven romantic partners in his life, four who died from HIV, two who were murdered, and only one who was still alive.

On December 8, 2011, Hill was arrested for interfering with a police investigation at Treasures strip club in southwest Houston.

== Illness and death ==
Hill was diabetic and had more than two heart surgeries, and had his left leg and half his right foot amputated because of diabetes complications.

Hill died on November 24, 2018, from heart failure while in hospice care. In his final months, Hill worked to prepare for his death, including giving feedback on his obituary and even inviting "TV stations to come film B-roll to use as background footage when the time came."

== Activism ==
=== LGBT activism ===
Hill co-organized the first gay rights organization in Houston in 1967, with Rita Wanstrom and David Patterson, the Promethean Society.

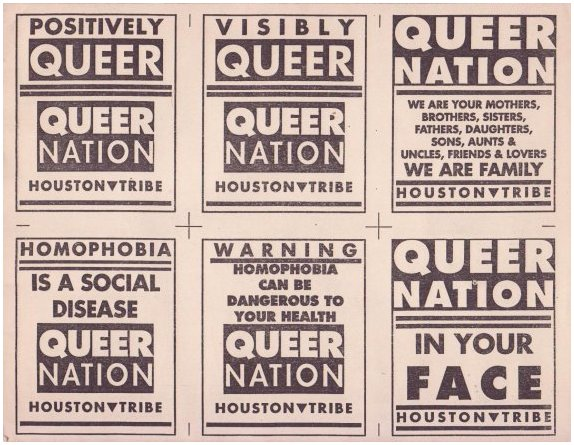
Queer Nation Houston flyers

In 1975 Hill just out of prison began working for a Houston radio station KPFT-FM which he co-founded in 1968, where he hosted a show about gay issues. Sometimes the show would get calls from homophobic listeners who threatened to murder Hill, and Hill would flippantly give the threatening callers directions to the radio station studio.

Hill and others organized Houston's first gay pride parade in June 1976, which attracted around 120 supporters.

Anita Bryant's 1977 visit to Houston was the catalyst to starting a fervent gay rights movement in Houston. Twelve thousand gay and allied Houstonians came to a protest organized by Hill and the Gay and Lesbian Political Caucus at Bryant's concert of June 14 for the Texas Bar Association in downtown Houston.

In 1978 Hill organized what is called Town Hall Meeting I, a meeting of around 4,000 LGBTQ people held in the Astro Arena. This meeting served as the precursor to many Houston area LGBTQ organizations, including the Montrose Center and the Gay and Lesbian Switchboard of Houston.

In 1991 Paul Broussard, a 27-year-old gay Houstonian, was murdered by a group of men on the street. Hill insisted that the murder was a hate crime or "gay bashing" and urged the media to pay attention. He also helped organize Queer Nation, a queer activist group, to protest the murder and the police's apathy. Hill was active in keeping the case in the public eye and called for the strong punishment of the perpetrators.

Hill was also involved with the Supreme Court case Lawrence v. Texas which is known for striking down sodomy laws in the United States. Hill helped the men involved with the case through getting their trial to the Supreme Court.

Hill was also an activist for those living with HIV and AIDS, and served on the board of directors for the FAIR Foundation. In 1979 Hill began helping the first people he knew with HIV/AIDS, although at the time the physicians did not know that they were living with HIV/AIDS, but believed that they had Kaposi's sarcoma. It is now known that Kaposi's sarcoma can be developed when one has HIV, although it was several years before AIDS was named, initially having been called gay-related immune deficiency (GRID), a term Hill and others fought against. Hill is credited as authoring the first safe-sex pamphlet in the United States to help stop the spread of HIV and AIDS, which was circulated by the group Citizens for Human Equality in 1982.

=== Prison and law enforcement activism ===
In 1980 Hill, while serving as general manager of the station, created The Prison Show which he hosted on KPFT-FM. The show combined prison news with people who had family or friends in prison calling in to the show so that they could talk to inmates who did not have access to phones but did have access to a radio. Hill has also married prisoners' loved ones "by proxy" on his show, totaling 12 proxy ceremonies by 2010. Hill retired from hosting the show in 2011, but came back for a few months in 2012 while the show searched for a new host.

In 1999 Hill read a letter from Jon Buice, one of the perpetrators of Paul Broussard's murder, on The Prison Show. Hill felt conflicted about his relationship with the Broussard murder, as he felt that he was the reason that the murder had been classified as a hate crime which in turn cause Buice's strict 45-year prison sentencing. Hill became friends with Buice because of this and began advocating for his release from prison. Hill worked with a Canadian journalist Alison Armstrong to create a documentary about Buice and the Broussard murder which was released in 2015. On November 16, 2015, Buice was granted parole, and on December 30, 2015, he was released, Hill being one of the individuals present to greet him as he left prison.

In 1999 Hill wrote and starred in a one-man show, the eponymous Ray Hill and the Sex Police. Hill reopened the show in January 2012, following his arrest at Treasure strip club in Houston.

Hill also spoke out against the police tactic of stings in which police officers go undercover as gay men and according to Hill try to "entrap" gay men into committing crimes. A particular incident in 2013 where seven men were arrested for indecent exposure and had their names and mugshots published spurred Hill to protest these stings and challenge the then mayor of Houston, Annise Parker, specifically because she is openly lesbian.

== City of Houston v. Hill ==
Hill was the plaintiff of a 1987 Supreme Court case, City of Houston v. Hill. The case was argued March 23, 1987, and decided June 15, 1987. The case was about a Houston ordinance which made it illegal to interrupt a police officer who was performing his or her duty. The Supreme Court held that the ordinance violated citizens' First Amendment rights to freedom of speech. The court in its ruling at one point labeled Hill a "citizen provocateur", a title Hill later put on his business cards. Hill has won four federal cases against the city of Houston for similar police and First Amendment rights including removing ordinances that disallowed citizens from blocking sidewalks and forcing citizens to identify themselves to police officers.

== Media ==
Hill and his long-running The Prison Show on KPFT-FM radio station were the subjects of a 2005 documentary called Citizen Provocateur: Ray Hill's Texas Prison Show, created by Brian Huberman, a Rice University professor of film. The documentary follows Hill and his coworkers that are involved with the making of The Prison Show, and includes stories from Hill's life, especially his time in prison.

Hill was the subject of a short documentary entitled The Trouble with Ray directed by filmmaker Travis Johns and produced by Jarrod Gullett of Proud Pony International. The documentary began as a 23-minute short after the filmmakers met Hill at a party by chance. It premiered with the Texas Filmmaker's Showcase at the Director's Guild Theater in Los Angeles, and after an award-winning festival run ("Best Short Doc" at VideoFest Dallas and Chicago's Reeling Festival; "Top 5 Short Docs" at Raindance London) that included IDFA in Amsterdam the filmmakers' pitch for a feature-length version of the project won the "AmDocs Film Fund" at the American Documentary Film Festival in Palm Springs, and they were awarded a grant of $5,000 toward production costs to start. Additional fundraising efforts included grants, private contributions, fiscal sponsorship through Austin Film Society, as well as a successful $50,000 Kickstarter campaign. The full-length documentary Loud Mouth Queer debuted in Palm Springs with a world premiere at The 9th Annual American Documentary Film Festival in 2020.

Hill was also a featured character in Alison Armstrong's documentary film The Guy with the Knife, which tells the story of Paul Broussard's murder and the later friendship formed between Hill and one of Broussard's murderers Jon Buice. The documentary was controversial, and Hill received some vitriol for befriending and defending Buice. The documentary was released in 2015.

Hill was featured on the popular radio show, This American Life.

== Awards ==
- 1999 First Amendment Award from the Houston Trial Lawyers Foundation.
- 2001 Lifetime Achievement Award from the Unity Committee.
- 2001 Lifetime Achievement Award from the Stonewall Lawyers Association.
- 2005 Lifetime Achievement Award from ACLU of Texas.
- 2006 Trailblazer Award from SCALE (and HIV and AIDS organization).
- 2008 The John P. McGovern Award from University of Texas School of Public Health.
- 2010 Amicus Achievement Grant from the South Texas College of Law.
- 2014 Heritage Award from Houston Pride, Inc.
- 2014 FACE Awards: Gay Male Activist of the Year and Community Hero of the Year.
- 2015 Living Legend Award from the Democratic Party of Harris County.
- 2015 Community Visionary Award from the Montrose Center.
- 2017 Favorite Gay Male Hero (OutSmart Magazine Gayest and Greatest Awards)

== See also ==
- LGBT culture in Houston
