= LGBTQ culture in Houston =

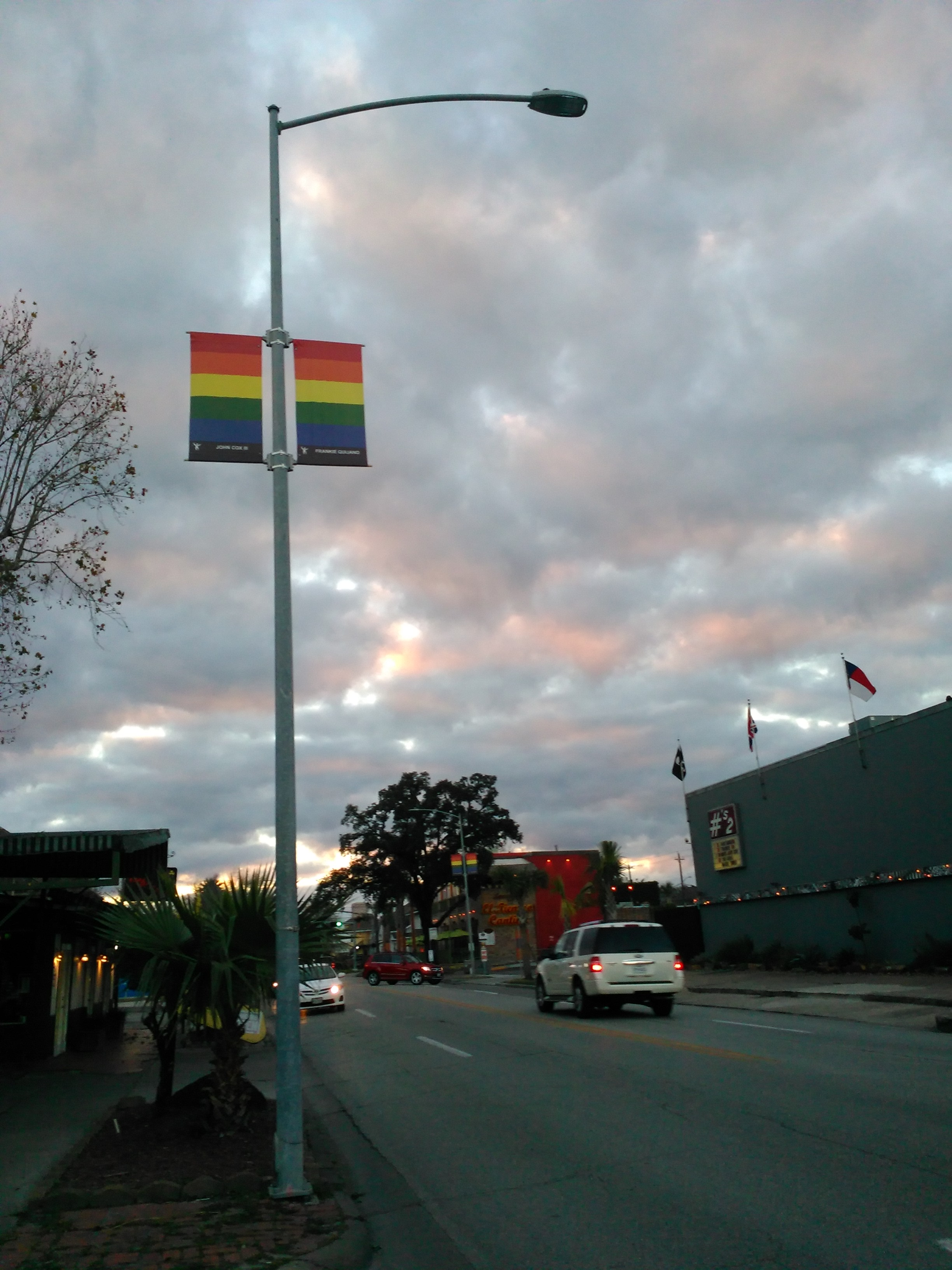
LGBT rainbow banners in Montrose, Houston

Houston has a large and diverse LGBT population, and its gay pride parade is the 4th largest pride parade in the nation. Houston has the largest LGBT population of any city in the state of Texas.

== History ==
According to Ray Hill, a Montrose resident quoted in the Houston Press, before the 1970s, the city's gay bars were spread around Downtown Houston and what is now Midtown Houston. Gays and lesbians needed to have a place to socialize after the closing of the gay bars. They began going to Art Wren, a 24-hour restaurant in Montrose, a community of empty nesters and widows. LGBT community members were attracted to Montrose as a neighborhood after encountering it while patronizing Art Wren, and they began to gentrify the neighborhood and assist the widows with the maintenance of their houses. Within Montrose, new gay bars began to open. By 1985, the flavor and politics of the neighborhood were heavily influenced by the LGBT community. and in 1990, according to Hill, 19% of the residents of Montrose were LGBT. Paul Broussard was murdered in Montrose in 1991.

In 1999 community members created the Gulf Coast Archive and Museum of Gay, Lesbian and Bisexual History (GCAM), the first such museum in Texas.

In the 2000s many LGBT individuals began moving to Westbury and several began referring to it as "Little Montrose". By 2009 some were also moving to Riverside Terrace. By 2011 many LGBT people moved to the Houston Heights and to suburbs in Greater Houston, and according to Hill, possibly less than 8% of Montrose's population was LGBT. Decentralization of Houston's LGBT population with the increasing LGBT acceptance in the city caused business at gay bars in Montrose to decline. Hill stated that "Gay bars used to be places where we had to go to get refuge because we were not welcome anywhere else. Well, guess what? There's nowhere we're not welcome anymore." The suburbs especially attracting gays are Pearland, Sugar Land, and Missouri City.

In February 2015 a 17-year-old gay student at Lutheran High School North reported that the school forced him to leave since he refused to take down YouTube videos discussing his sexuality. The school's executive director, Wayne Kramer, referred to the student handbook, which stated: "Lutheran High North reserves the right, within its sole discretion, to refuse admission of an applicant and/or to discontinue enrollment of a current student participating in, promoting, supporting or condoning: pornography, sexual immorality, homosexual activity or bisexual activity".

In 2023 Houston had one lesbian bar left, Pearl. That year, according to Julie Mabry, who owns the bar, an underwriter for an insurance company told her that because the bar had drag performances, the company would not allow her to buy insurance for the business. In 2025 the State of Texas ordered the destruction of the rainbow crosswalks in Montrose. They were replaced by banners depicting the Progress Pride flag in 2026. After the 2026 midterms resulted in Democratic Party members scheduled to take statewide positions, activists asked for Mayor of Houston John Whitmire to reinstate the colored crosswalks.

The GCAM closed in 2024; a successor group, Heart Of Leather, maintains thousands of items from LGBTQ Houstonians and is seeking a new physical venue as of 2026. Heart Of Leather displayed several such items, including memorabilia from Mary's Lounge, at an exhibit in September, 2026.

== Economy ==
Jordan Blum of the Houston Chronicle stated in 2016 that levels of LGBT acceptance and discrimination vary throughout the Houston energy industry. Around the 1990s BP, Chevron, Royal Dutch Shell, and several other companies offered benefits and protection to LGBT employees equal to that of straight employees. According to Blum many LGBT-identifying persons told him that several companies have cultures non-supportive of LGBT-identifying persons and that some had "described thinly veiled or blatant discrimination." Blum stated that "In many ways, the energy sector mirrors Houston's dual identities - the diverse, innovative, big-business urban image clashing with a conservative culture, deeply rooted in Christian faith."

== Institutions ==
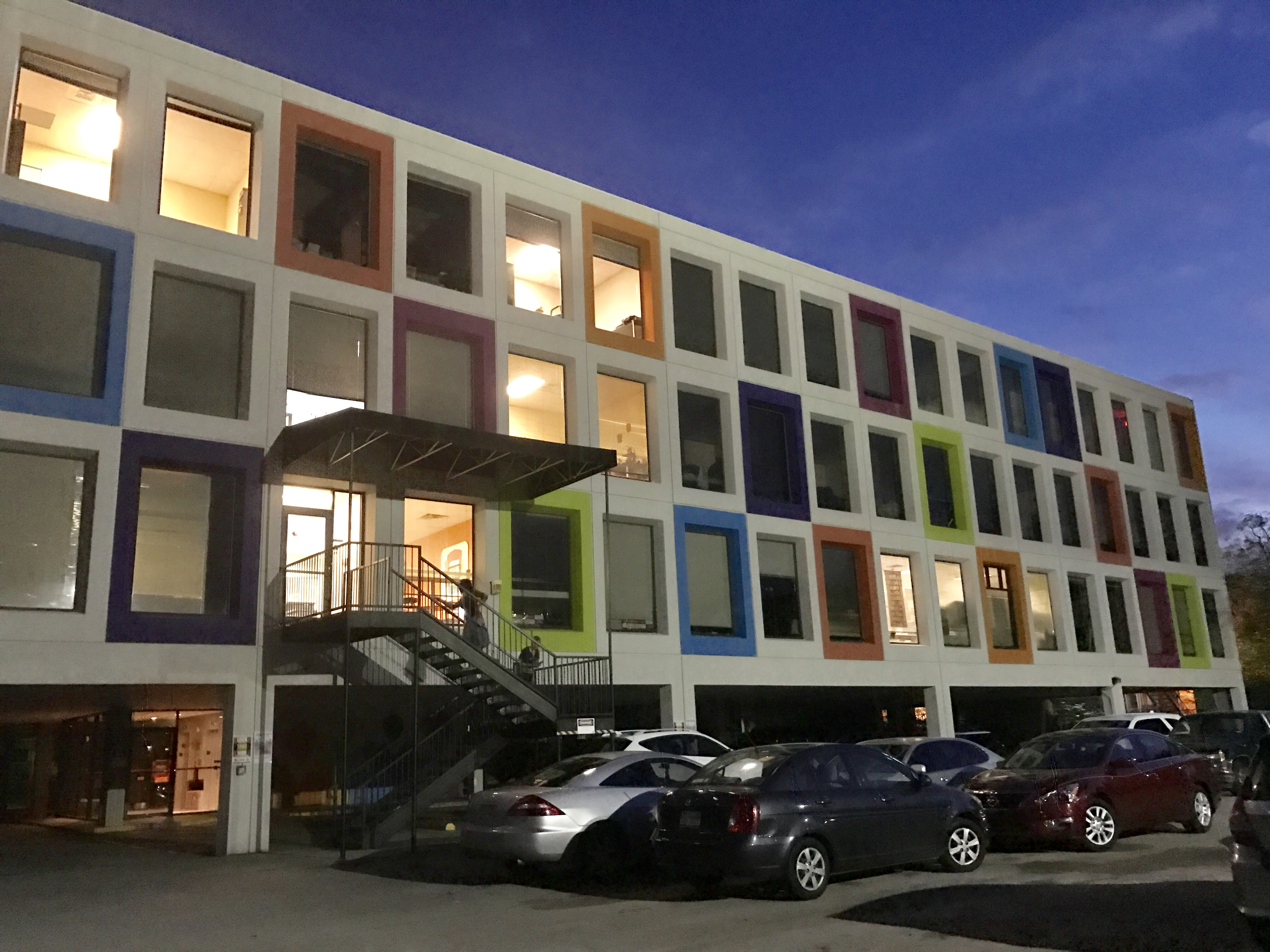
Rainbow colored windows on the Montrose Center building

The Montrose Center is an LGBT community center located in the Montrose district of Houston.

The center in 2019 began the establishment of a senior center in the Third Ward.

== Politics and activism ==
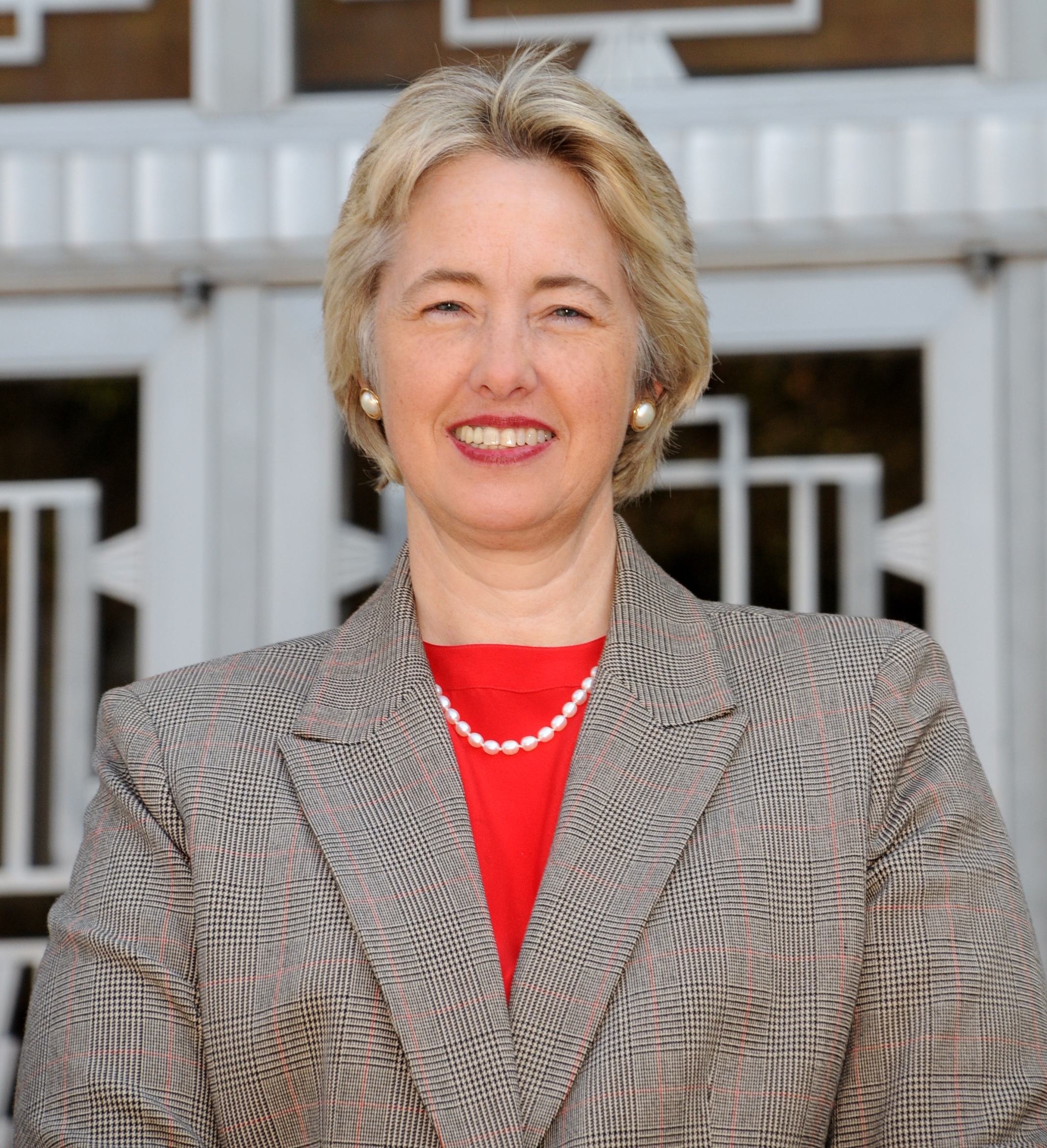
Annise Parker, former Mayor of Houston

Michael Ennis of the Texas Monthly stated in 1980 that within Texas, "gay political inroads" were "most visible" in Houston. In the October 1979 Village Voice Richard Goldstein wrote that due to the perceived threat from the "Christian right" in the area, gay people in Houston "take politics more seriously" than those in New York City.

The Marriage of Billie Ert and Antonio Molina, the first gay marriage in Texas, took place in 1972, although it was later voided by the Texas Attorney General.

In 1978, Steve Shifflet, a former Young Republican, became the head of the Houston Gay Political Caucus (HGPC). He advocated for using bloc-voting so gay people could get their preferred candidates. That year, the LGBT bloc-voted to put Mickey Leland in the Congressional seat formerly held by Barbara Jordan, and Leland personally thanked the HGPC.

In 1979, Montrose became included in a single-member Houston City Council district and therefore increasing LGBT political representation.

In 1980, Montrose was in Texas Legislative District 79. That year, Ennis stated that according to "[l]ocal politicians" the district "will now go the way the gay vote goes."

In the fall 1979 election for Houston City Council, Eleanor Tinsley, a liberal, and Frank Mann, a conservative, competed for an at-large city council district. Tinsley attracted LGBT voters while Mann referred to them as "oddwads and queers" as a way of polarizing those opposing the LGBT community into voting for him. Due to the support of the LGBT community, Tinsley defeated Mann.

In 2002, voters in the City of Houston had passed Proposition 2, which outlawed the city government from giving same-sex partners of municipal employees benefits.

In 2010, Annise Parker, a lesbian woman, was voted Mayor of Houston, making that city the first large American city to vote an openly homosexual person as a mayor. This made Parker the LGBT official in the United States with the largest constituency. Parker had been elected to political offices in the city government six previous times. Miguel Bustillo of The Wall Street Journal stated that this occurred "with little controversy over her sexual preference".

The Houston Equal Rights Ordinance (HERO) gave transgender women the right to use women's restrooms. Christian groups opposed the ordinance. Opponents gathered 50,000 votes on a petition to have it recalled. The voting base rejected HERO in November 2015.

Buddy's, in 2020, was the first gay bar in the state where people did voting. The bar closed in 2024.

== Media ==
OutSmart is a monthly LGBT magazine in Houston. In 2008 the Houston Press ranked it the "Best Local Magazine."

KPFT held radio programs for LGBT topics starting in the 1970s. In 2024 two archivists engaged in preservation of the archives of these programs.

== Culture ==
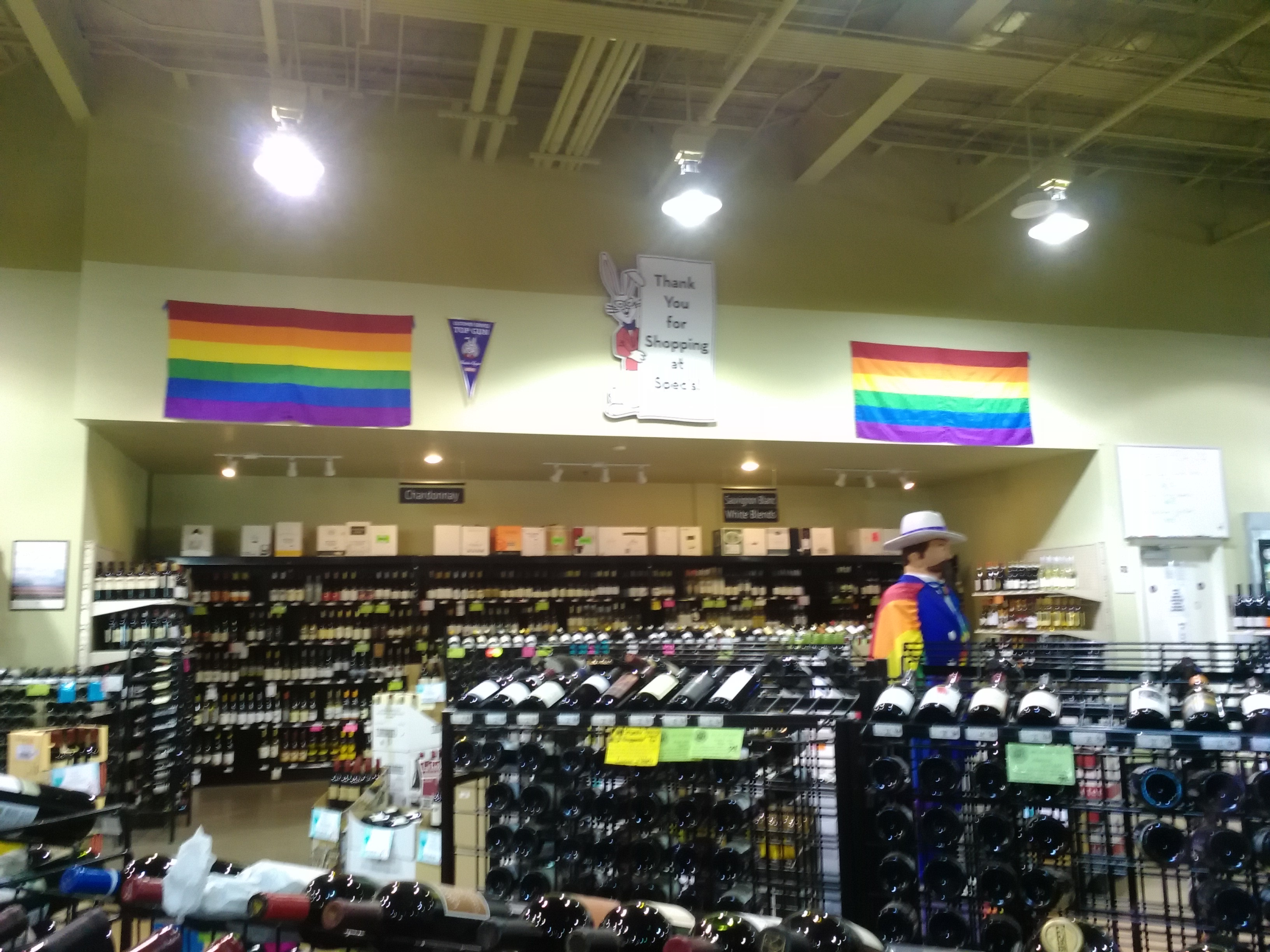
LGBT flags at the Montrose Spec's

In previous eras, gay people in the area attended gay rock and roll clubs. By 1980, gay Houstonians were still going to disco clubs, while among straight people disco was a fad.

Charles Armstrong owns four gay clubs in Houston, with two of them being South Beach and Montrose Mining Company; Mandy Oaklander of the Houston Press wrote in 2011 that Armstrong's clubs were "the most successful clubs in Houston's gay scene".

In 2002 Jeremy Quittner of The Advocate wrote that "it would seem" one could be prevented from being in the "superelite" of Houston for being homosexual; he stated this in reference to Michael J. Kopper, the chief assistant of Enron CFO Andrew Fastow.

The Gay Men's Chorus of Houston is the premier predominately gay male chorus in the Houston metro. The men's chorus was founded in 1979 and has a predominately lesbian counterpart known as the Bayou City Women's Chorus. The women's chorus was established in 2005.

"Out at the Rodeo" week is held annually at the Houston Livestock Show and Rodeo in March. During this week, there are several events acknowledging and celebrating the LGBT community in conjunction with the festival.

The Houston Gay Pride Parade is the largest pride parade in Texas. Pride Houston (parade organizers) has been able to attract approximately 200,000 spectators from Houston and beyond for the annual June event. For the first time since its inception, the parade has moved from Montrose to Downtown Houston for 2015. The reason cited for the move is that downtown has the space and resources to improve the quality and size of the event.

Houston's annual Gay and Lesbian Film Festival is organized by Qfest. Qfest was founded in 1996 and sponsors several events throughout the year.

Revelry is the premiere annual circuit party in Houston. The event has been growing in popularity and notoriety since 2016.

Orgullo Houston is a non-profit organization that seek out, recognize and celebrate the contributions that Latinos and Latinas make to the LGBT community. In 2016, the organization held Houston's first LGBT event with an emphasis on Latinx people and culture. The organization holds annual events.

Houston Splash is a black LGBT pride event that attracts a few thousand attendees. It is the oldest black LGBT pride event in Texas beginning in 1988 (rebranded and trademarked in 1995) and is held every early first week of May. It is the largest event of its kind in the Gulf Coast Region with a five-day span of activities celebrating the black LGBT community.

The epicenter of Houston's gay community and nightlife is the Montrose district.

== Religion ==
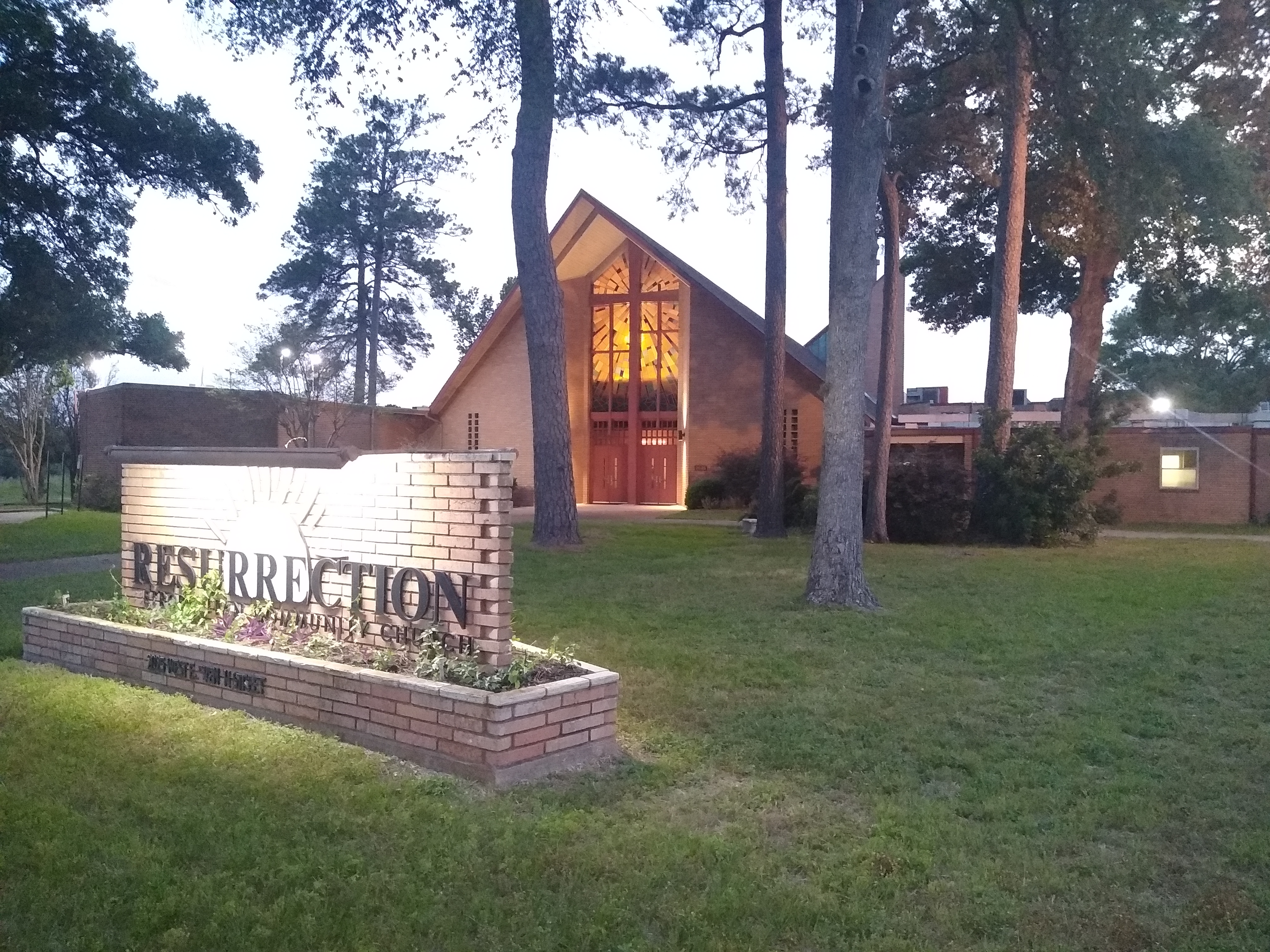
Resurrection Metropolitan Community Church

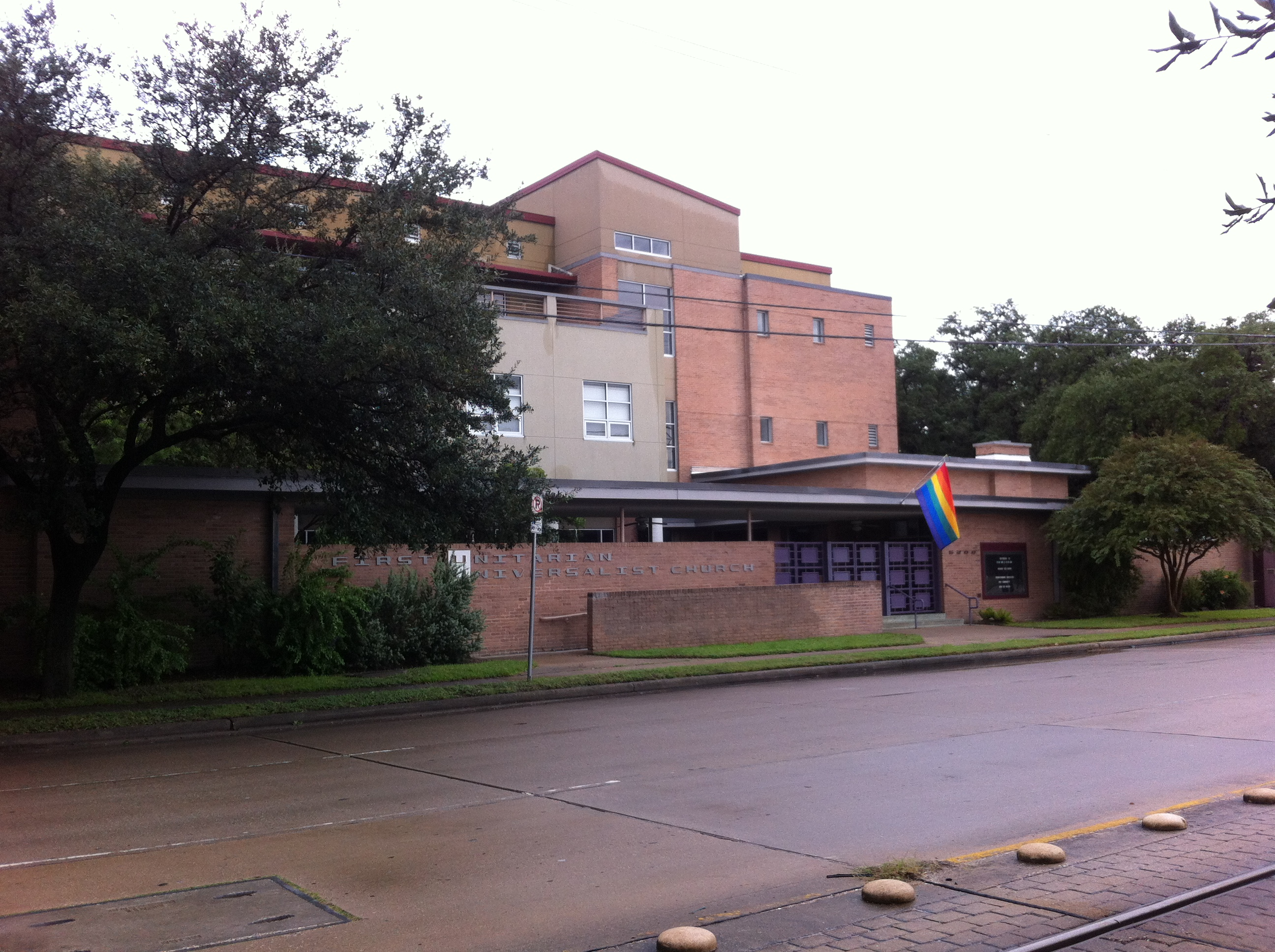
The LGBT flag at the First Unitarian Universalist Church in Houston, 2014

=== Christianity ===
Some Christian churches accept members of the LGBT community. In 2008 Reverend Dwayne Johnson, the pastor of the Resurrection Metropolitan Community Church, a church in Timbergrove Manor, near the Houston Heights, stated that there were about 15-20 openly gay Christian clergy members in Houston.

Resurrection Metropolitan's main service group is the LGBT community. In 1980 the pastor was gay, and almost all of the congregation was LGBT. In December 2010 Reverend Harry Knox, a pro-LGBT activist, became the leader of the Resurrection Metropolitan. In 2011 Resurrection Metropolitan had 850 members.

Over the years a number of Evangelical/Pentecostal GLBT affirming churches have also ministered to the Houston Community. Community Gospel Church began in the early 1980s and served the community until 2012, with about 150 members at its height. In 2012, Gateway of Hope Church was birthed as a Pentecostal/Word of Faith, Spirit Filled, Word Based, Jesus Centered fellowship meeting off of Dacoma Street and Hempstead Highway and is pastored by Pastor Sven Verbeet. It is affiliated with the Covenant Network and serves not only the Houston area, but also active missions works in the Philippines and India. Founded in 2010 Living Mosaic Christian Church is an independent, nondenominational fellowship, pastored by Rev. Jason Wood meets at the Montrose Counseling Center. Living Mosaic's worship style is a liturgical and evangelical blend.

In 1995 Grace Evangelical Lutheran Church began accepting LGBT members and became a "Reconciling in Christ" Lutheran church; it was founded in 1922. In 2008 René Garcia, a member of the Evangelical Lutheran Church in America (ELCA), stated that he estimated that 40% of the members identified themselves as LGBT, with many of them coming from other Christian denominations such as Missouri Synod Lutheranism and Roman Catholicism.

In 2008 pro-LGBT activist Jay Bakker argued that Joel Osteen, pastor of Lakewood Church, should speak out in favor of the LGBT community, and invited him to join his group in a picnic.

There is one pro-LGBTQ church on the west side of the metropolitan area, First Christian Church (FCC) Katy.

=== Judaism ===
The group Keshet Houston is a non-profit organization that connects Jewish LGBT people in the Houston area. They connect Jewish people with LGBT affirming synagogues as well as holding their own social and religious events. Keshet Houston has participated in the Houston Pride Parade since 2014, and in 2015 the first legally married same-sex couple from Texas rode on their float.

Temple Emanu El is an LGBT friendly congregation whose leaders have spoken out against LGBT discrimination, and participated in events that seek to end this discrimination in Texas.

Several synagogues have hired LGBT clergy, including Congregation B'rith Shalom, Congregation Beth Israel, and Congregation B'nai Israel in Galveston.

=== Islam ===
Houston has a large number of Muslim residents, constituting approximately 1.2% of the population. After the 2016 Orlando nightclub shooting, M.J. Khan, the president of the Islamic Society of Greater Houston denounced the shooter, and said that the Muslim community stands in solidarity with LGBT people. The Council on American-Islamic Relations of Houston also hosted a blood drive to benefit those who had been hurt by the shooting.

In 2022 there were plans to open a mosque which caters to Houston's LGBT communities.

== Notable residents ==
- Michael Arceneaux (author of I Can't Date Jesus)
- Paul Broussard (murder victim)
- Harrison Guy
- Annise Parker (Mayor of Houston)
- Monica Roberts

== See also ==
- LGBT rights in Texas
- Homosocialization
