= Ramsey Unit =

Prison farm in Texas

W. F. Ramsey Unit
- Interactive map of W. F. Ramsey Unit
- Location: 1100 FM 655 Rosharon, Texas 77583; 29.2863889°N 095.5463889°W
- Status: Operational
- Security class: G1-G3, G5, Administrative Segregation, Outside Trusty
- Capacity: Unit: 1,570 Trusty Camp: 321
- Opened: July 1908
- Former name: Ramsey I Unit
- Managed by: TDCJ Correctional Institutions Division
- Warden: Caleb Brumley
- Website: tdcj.state.tx.us/unit_directory../r1.html

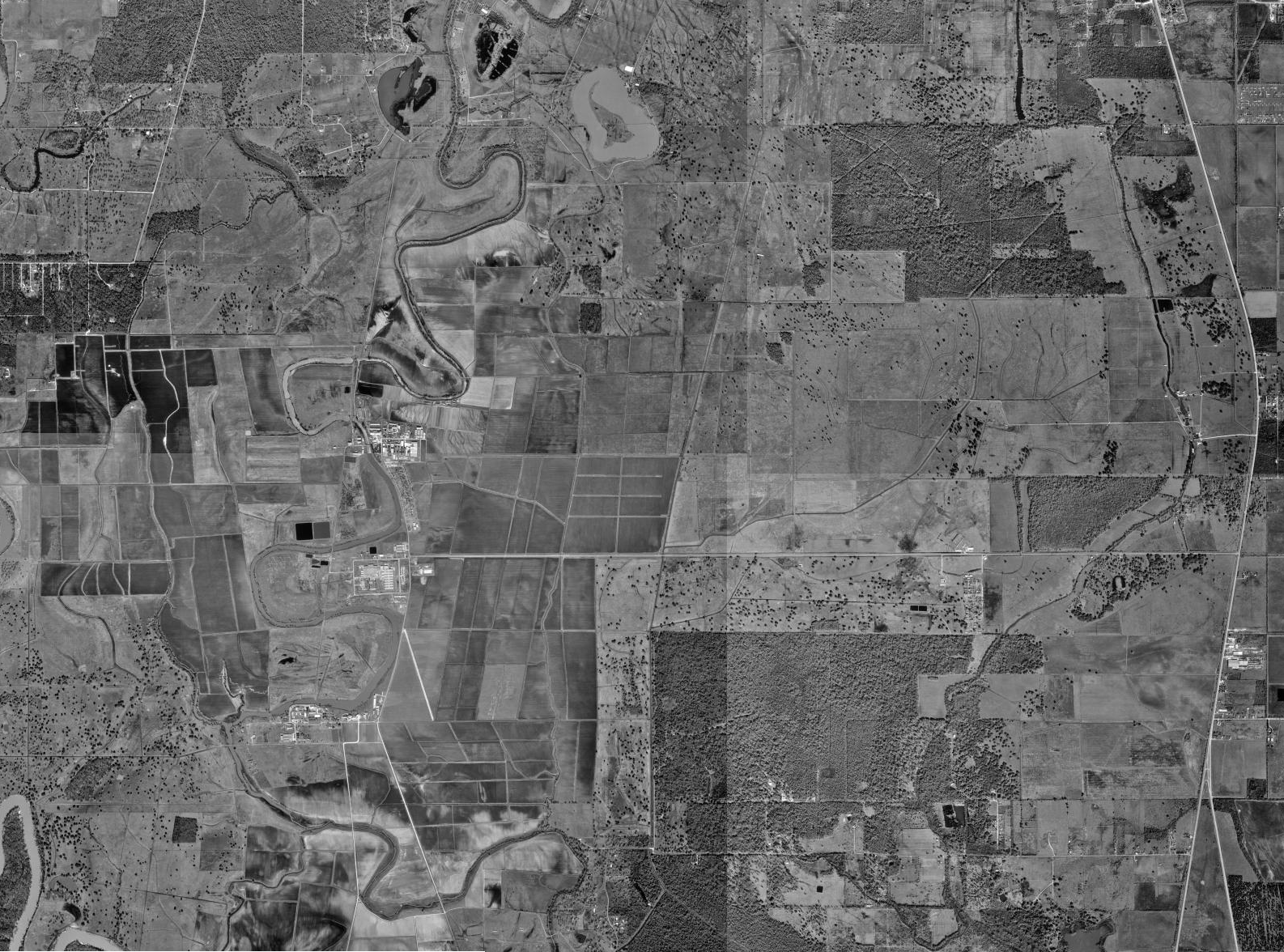
Aerial photograph of the Ramsey Units, January 23, 1995, United States Geological Survey

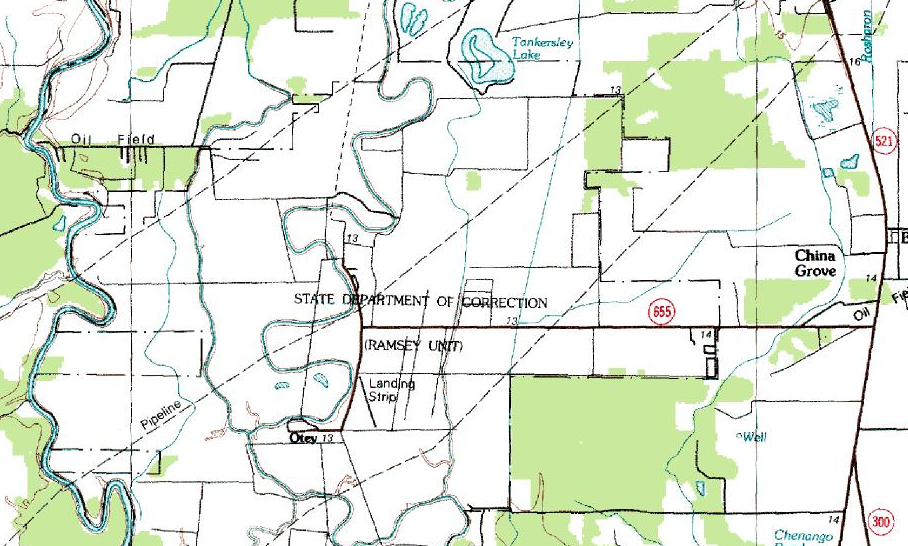
Topographical map of the Ramsey Units, July 1, 1984, United States Geological Survey

The W. F. Ramsey Unit (previously Ramsey I Unit) is a Texas Department of Criminal Justice prison farm located in unincorporated Brazoria County, Texas, with a Rosharon postal address; it is not inside the Rosharon census-designated place. The prison is located on Farm to Market Road 655, 4 miles (6.4 km) west of Farm to Market Road 521, and south of Houston. The 16,369-acre (6,624 ha) unit is co-located with the Stringfellow Unit and the Terrell Unit.

== History ==
The unit opened in July 1908. The Ramsey Prison Farm consisted of five former plantations. In 1935, Ramsey housed African American prisoners. In 1963, before racial desegregation took place, the Ramsey I Unit housed white prisoners.

In 2011, the Central Unit closed. The former truck distribution center at Central moved to Ramsey.

== Operations ==
The University of Houston–Clear Lake offers bachelor's and master's degree programs at Ramsey. Prisoners may pay the State of Texas after their release.

The Texas Legislature designated portions of Angleton ISD that by September 1, 1995 had not been annexed by Alvin Community College as in the Brazosport College zone. As Ramsey Unit is not in the maps of Alvin CC, it is in the Brazosport College zone. There was a section of H.B. No. 2744, filed on March 6, 2007, which would have changed the boundary between Alvin CC and Brazosport CC to put the Ramsey Unit in the Alvin CC service boundary.

== Notable inmates ==
Notable inmates of the Ramsey Unit include:

Current (As of 2015):

Inmate Name	Register Number	Status	Details
Shawn Allen Berry	04693746 / 00894758	Serving a life sentence. Eligible for parole in 2038.	Participated, along with Lawrence Brewer and John King, in the brutal 1998 murder of James Byrd Jr., in which Byrd was chained to a truck, and his body was dragged with the moving vehicle.
David Henry Tuck	06716680 / 01403389	Serving a life sentence. Eligible for parole in 2036.	Known for the 2006 Harris County, Texas hate crime assault in which he, along with Keith Robert Turner attacked fellow high school student David Ritcheson.
Roy Oliver	09347254 / 02216845	Serving a 15 year sentence. Eligible for parole in 2026.	Police officer who committed the 2017 Murder of Jordan Edwards in which Oliver shot him in a moving vehicle that was leaving a party.
Aaron York Dean	10872300 / 02424353	Serving an 11 year sentence. Eligible for parole in 2028.	Convicted of manslaughter over the 2019 Killing of Atatiana Jefferson, in which Dean killed her after showing up to her house with reports of an open front door.
Carlos Coy	04236244 / 01110642	Serving a 45 year sentence. Eligible for parole in 2028.	Rapper known as South Park Mexican who was sentenced in 2002 for molesting a minor.
Steven Hobbs	08928224 / 02389446	Serving a life sentence. Eligible for parole in 2041.	Serial killer who murdered 2 people, and sexually assaulted many others.
Juan David Ortiz	11398548 / 02423750	Serving a life sentence without parole.	Former Border Patrol agent who murdered 4 people in 2018.
Eddie Ray Routh	08977806 / 01980993	Serving a life sentence without parole.	Perpetrator of the 2013 Murders of Chris Kyle and Chad Littlefield
Yella Beezy (Markies Conway)	02643409	Serving Life sentence without parole (awaiting appeal as of 2026)- PDLLC	Charged in the murder for hire of Dallas rapper MO3.

- Feanyichi Ezekwesi Uvukansi - Perpetrator of 2012 shooting outside a southwest Houston nightclub that left three people dead and rapper Trae tha Truth injured.

Former:

- David Ruíz, plaintiff of Ruiz v. Estelle, served time at the historic Ramsey Farm.
- Michael Morton - Exonerated of the crime which he was convicted of. He had requested a transfer to Ramsey so he could complete a master's degree program there.
- David Owen Brooks - perpetrator of the Houston Mass Murders
- Ray Hill (American activist) - LGBT+ and Prison Rights activist, former host of The Prison Show on KPFT.
