= OutSmart =

American LGBT magazine

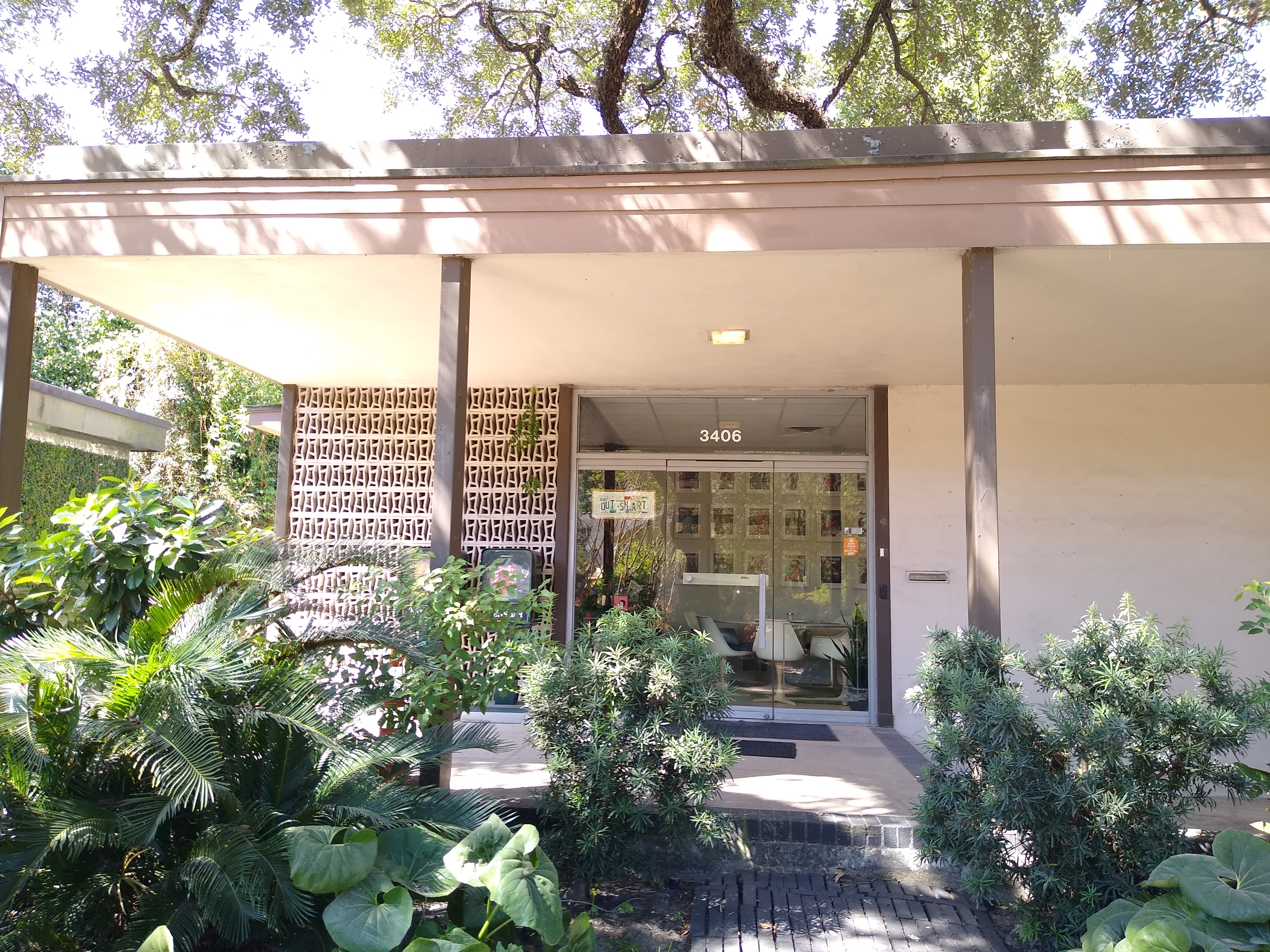
- OutSmart headquarters in Neartown, Houston
- Editor-in-chief: Greg Jeu
- Associate publisher emeritus: Tom Fricke
- Creative Director/Art Director: Alex Rosa
- Assistant Editor/Web Editor: Lourdes Zavaleta
- Entertainment Editor: Blase DiStefano
- Frequency: Monthly
- Publisher: Greg Jeu
- Founder: Greg Jeu
- Founded: 1994
- Company: OutSmart Media Company
- Country: United States
- Based in: Houston, Texas
- Language: English
- Website: outsmartmagazine.com

OutSmart Magazine, or simply OutSmart, is a monthly publication serving Houston's LGBT community since 1994. Founded by Greg Jeu, the magazine's outreach has exceeded 200,000 and is distributed at over 350 locations in Houston and Galveston, as well as in Austin, Corpus Christi, Dallas, El Paso, and San Antonio. Upon its creation, it was the only local magazine to highlight the society, politics, and culture surrounding the LGBT community in Houston, rather than serving as an entertainment guide; most other publications at that time tended to feature sexually-explicit content and advertisements. OutSmart is also certified and verified by the National Gay and Lesbian Chamber of Commerce as an LGBT Business Enterprise and is audited by Verified Audit Circulation.

OutSmart has won numerous accolades, including the Nation's Best Local Gay and Lesbian Magazine by the Vice Versa Gay Press Awards in 1998 and 1999; Best Local Magazine by the Houston Press from 2006 to 2009; and several Lone Star Awards, awarded by the Houston Press Club Association.

In conjunction with the Houston Gay Pride Parade, OutSmart provided the official guide to the event in 2009 and 2010. In October 2010, OutSmart partnered with the Montrose Center to raise awareness about domestic violence within the LGBT community for Domestic Violence Awareness Month.
