= Raymond Hill =

Raymond Hill or Ray Hill may refer to:

- Raymond Hill (musician) (1934–1996), American R&B saxophonist who played on "Rocket 88"
- Raymond Hill (formerly Bacon Hill), the hill on which was located Raymond Hotel in Pasadena, California
- Raymond Hill, founder and lead developer of uBlock Origin browser extension
- Ray Hill (American football) (1975–2015), American football player
- Ray Hill (British activist) (1939–2022), British political figure
- Ray Hill (American activist) (1940–2018), activist from Houston, Texas
