= Murder of Paul Broussard =

1991 murder in Houston, Texas, US

Paul Gilbert Broussard
- Born: January 29, 1964; Roosevelt County, New Mexico, U.S.
- Died: July 4, 1991 (aged 27); Houston, Harris County, Texas
- Cause of death: Homicide by stabbing
- Known for: Victim of homicide

Paul Broussard (1964–1991), a 27-year-old Houston-area banker and Texas A&M alumnus, died after a gay bashing incident outside a Houston nightclub in the early hours of July 4, 1991. Nine teenaged youths, ages 15–17, and one 22-year-old were intoxicated on drugs and alcohol when they left a high school party in the suburb of The Woodlands and headed for Houston's heavily gay Montrose area in an attempt to gain admittance to dance clubs located in the vicinity.

After being refused entry to several establishments, they pulled into a parking lot where they encountered Broussard and two friends, who were also intoxicated. They then attacked Broussard and his friends. Broussard was beaten and stabbed twice with a pocket knife belonging to 17-year-old Jon Buice. He died several hours later as a result of both internal injuries as well as what an expert medical examiner termed "a delay in treatment" (in the early days of the AIDS crisis, police and medical personnel were slow to respond to calls from the Montrose area for fear of AIDS contamination).

When Houston gay rights leader Ray Hill confronted police about solving the murder, he was told that they had no intention of doing so. Gay rights advocates, frustrated about being ignored and persecuted by city officials, marched through the streets and in front of the Mayor Kathy Whitmire's home for several days in what became Houston's largest and long-lasting gay rights demonstration in history. Ultimately, the juveniles – labeled "The Woodlands Ten" – were apprehended and plea bargained into prison without a trial for the murder of Broussard.

== The attack ==
Paul Broussard was walking across a parking lot just after 2:00 a.m., on July 4, 1991, in the heavily gay Montrose neighborhood of Houston, Texas, accompanied by his friends Cary Anderson and Richard Delaunay, when the trio encountered ten juveniles from The Woodlands: Jaime Aguirre, Javier Aguirre, Derrick Attard, Jon Buice, Chance Paul Dillon, Rafael Grable Gonzalez, Gayland Randle, Leandro Ramirez, Brian Spake, and Jeffrey Valentine. All but Dillon attended McCullough High School in The Woodlands.

Broussard and friends were just blocks away from home when the juveniles asked them for directions. The juveniles then reportedly exited their vehicles and attacked the men with fists, steel-toed boots, bear claws and a small pocket knife wielded by Buice. While Anderson and Delaunay escaped down a busy street (likely Montrose Blvd, the shortest distance to a busy street from Pacific and Grant), Broussard was surrounded by the attackers. Broussard suffered abrasions, puncture wounds, a broken rib, bruised testicles, and two stab wounds. As he lay on the ground, almost unconscious, two of his attackers rifled through his pockets and took a comb as a souvenir. The ten teens then drove off up I-45 towards The Woodlands.

When EMS staff arrived at the scene early on the morning of July 4, they found a wounded, but still conversant Broussard. As they prepared to transport him to Ben Taub Medical Center, a well known city trauma hospital, Broussard requested to be taken to St. Joseph Medical Center as his hospital of choice. After the brutal beating, hours reportedly ticked by before an ambulance arrived to transport Broussard to the hospital, which was less than three miles away. EMS staff initially determined that the severity of his wounds warranted low priority transport. Speculation referenced they thought they were avoiding transmission of HIV. As a consequence, what should have been an eight-minute trip took another forty minutes, and it was another hour before a doctor could be located who was willing to address Broussard's wounds. Broussard later died of internal injuries. His mother, Nancy Rodriguez, flew into Houston from Atlanta, and met with Houston police as well as with Anderson and Delaunay.

== Protests ==
Houston gay rights advocate Ray Hill went to the Houston police to find out the progress in the case. Once he learned that police had no intention of pursuing the murder, he met with television and newspaper outlets while helping to organize the largest gay rights protests in the city's history. Queer Nation Houston helped organize the large public protests, some of which took place in front of Mayor Kathy Whitmire's house, with Rodriguez participating. The resulting media attention led to one of the assailants' girlfriends calling the police.

== Arrests and sentencing ==
Attard went to New York after the attack, and was arrested there. Buice is reported to have turned himself in after being encouraged to do so by his father. All ten were soon arrested and signed confessions without attorneys present. Hill lobbied the prosecutor and district attorney for "meaningful sentences" for the attackers, dubbed the "Woodlands Ten." All ten of Broussard's assailants were eventually plea-bargained without the case going to trial.

Attard received probation for agreeing to testify against the other nine. Four other juveniles received probation, and Rodriguez – aided by the Houston Crime Victim's Office – worked with the D.A. to set the terms. The court also ordered them to pay for Anderson's hospital bill and Broussard's funeral. Attard and Randle violated the terms of their probations and were sent to prison. Buice, who inflicted the stab wounds, received a 45-year sentence. Dillon received a 20-year sentence for attempted murder and aggravated attempted murder. The three remaining assailants each received sentences of 15 years and one day for their admitted participation in the beatings. Their sentences were criticized by Rodriguez and Queer Nation as being too light.

== Prison, parole and release ==
Dillon was the first of the attackers to be released in March 2000, after serving just six years. He owed his freedom to a mandatory release law that was repealed in 1996. Attard, Gonzalez, Randle, Spake, and Valentine also received probation and were released. Buice, who received the longest sentence and is the last of the Woodlands Ten, was denied parole in October 2003, October 2005, and October 2007. He was granted parole in July 2011, however, which was revoked for reasons that were not disclosed to him and his family. Buice's parole was denied again on October 21, 2014. Buice was ultimately granted parole in November 2015 and released to the custody of his father on December 30 under strict and intensive supervision. Rodriguez currently lives near Macon, Georgia and has attended more than 20 parole hearings in her efforts to keep her son's assailants in prison.

== The Guy With The Knife ==
In 2006, while visiting Houston to report on a story about the aftermath of Hurricane Katrina, Canadian filmmaker Alison Armstrong heard about an "unusual friendship" between Hill and Buice. She learned that after meeting with Buice and others convicted of the murder, Hill became convinced that the Woodlands Ten were not homophobic or had been gay bashing on the night of Broussard's murder. Hill reported that he began to regret fabricating the false motive after meeting and corresponding with Buice and other members of the Woodlands Ten, and began encouraging Buice to pursue his education and worked toward helping Buice win release on parole. "I lied to get media attention to get Houston police to solve a gay murder. It was wrong, but it worked," he told Armstrong. "Now I'm doing what I have to do on behalf of Jon Buice."

Armstrong became intrigued with not only the unusual friendship between the two men, but also the role the media had played in all aspects of the case. Ultimately, she came to believe that the larger issue of a criminal justice system that would plea bargain nine minors into the adult prison system without the case ever going to trial, should also be an element covered by the film. However, much more came to light as the project unfolded. Armstrong's film The Guy With The Knife, uncovered a pattern of delay in responding to the gay community in Montrose by Houston first responders. Houston gay rights activist Maria Gonzalez recounted unfortunate advice that was repeated in Montrose during those years: "If you get hurt in Montrose, get in your car and drive some place else – and then call 9-1-1." In another scene, expert medical examiner Dr. Alan Taylor amends Broussard's cause of death to include "a delay in treatment." Other revelations include questionable practices by the Texas penal system and an unusually closed parole process that may violate the civil rights of the accused by withholding key information.

The documentary received numerous accolades from several LGBT film festivals. In early November 2015, the film was publicly screened at the LBJ School of Public Affairs in partnership with the University of Texas Law School, the Harvey Milk Society, The Center for Health and Social Policy, and The William Wayne Justice Center for Public Interest Law. It was followed by a panel discussion including Armstrong; Gonzalez; Texas Southern University journalism professor Michael Berryhill; and LBJ School criminal justice policy Professor Michele Deitch.

== Jon Buice ==
In April 1999, Buice wrote an open letter to the gay community apologizing and seeking to make amends for his role in Broussard's murder, which was addressed to the radio station KPFT and printed in the Houston Voice. Buice said he was moved to write the letter after hearing about the murder of Matthew Shepard. In a subsequent interview with a researcher, Buice said that he was not homophobic and had close friends and relatives who were gay. Buice also said that the attack had less to do with Broussard's sexual orientation than with thrill-seeking, male-bonding, peer pressure, and the influence of drugs and alcohol. Some, including Buice, had also used marijuana and LSD.

According to prison officials, Buice has a spotless prison record. While incarcerated, he earned associate degrees in business and accounting and a bachelor's degree in psychology.

Buice was denied his parole requests in 2007 and 2009. He was scheduled to be released on parole around October 2011, but after protests from Broussard's mother as well as other gay activists, the Parole Board reversed its decision and denied Buice parole. Buice's parole was reviewed in August 2012. He was denied again on October 21, 2014, but was ultimately granted and released on December 30, 2015, into the custody of his father, Jim Buice, under strict supervision. Buice's attempts at parole were supported by Hill, who is also an ex-convict and host of The Prison Show on KPFT. Others also speaking on behalf of parole for Buice included Gonzalez, Berryhill, and the late Houston Chronicle crime reporter Susan Bardwell. On January 20, 2020, Jon Buice was arrested in the Woodlands for driving while intoxicated. When police were called to the scene, they found a silver car in a ditch with a missing tire and Buice in the drivers seat.

== See also ==
- Violence against LGBT people
- LGBT rights in Texas
- LGBT community of Houston
