= City of Houston v. Hill =

- Supreme Court of the United States

Argued March 23, 1987 Decided June 15, 1987
- Full case name: City of Houston, Texas v. Ray Hill
- Citations: 482 U.S. 451 (more) 107 S. Ct. 2502, 96 L. Ed. 2d 398
- Argument: Oral argument

Case history
- Prior: Judgment for appellee reversed, 764 F.2d 1156 (CA5 1985), panel decision affirmed on rehearing en banc, 789 F.2d 1103 (1986), probable jurisdiction noted, 479 U.S. 811 (1986)

Holding
- A municipal ordinance that makes it unlawful to orally interrupt a police officer in the performance of his duty is substantially overbroad, and therefore invalid on its face under the First Amendment.

Court membership
- Chief Justice William Rehnquist Associate Justices William J. Brennan Jr. · Byron White; Thurgood Marshall · Harry Blackmun; Lewis F. Powell Jr. · John P. Stevens; Sandra Day O'Connor · Antonin Scalia

Case opinions
- Majority: Brennan, joined by White, Marshall, Blackmun, Stevens
- Concurrence: Blackmun
- Concurrence: Scalia (in judgment)
- Concur/dissent: Powell, joined by O'Connor; Rehnquist (Parts I and II); Scalia (Parts II and III)
- Dissent: Rehnquist

City of Houston v. Hill, 482 U.S. 451 (1987), was a United States Supreme Court case decided in 1987. The case concerned a municipal ordinance then in effect in Houston, Texas, which criminalized interrupting a police officer in the performance of his duties. The Court held that this ordinance was overbroad and facially invalid under the First Amendment to the United States Constitution. The court also considered whether abstention and waiting for the state courts to make a ruling on the ordinance was appropriate, and it held that absention was not appropriate for a facial challenge or where the entire statute was unconstitutional.

== Background ==
Upon shouting at police in an attempt to divert their attention from his friend during a confrontation, Hill was arrested for "willfully... interrupt[ing] a city policeman... by verbal challenge during an investigation" in violation of a municipal ordinance making it unlawful for any person "to assault, strike or in any manner oppose, molest, abuse or interrupt any policeman in the execution of his duty." After his acquittal in Municipal Court, Hill brought suit in federal District Court challenging the ordinance's constitutionality and seeking, among other things, damages and attorney's fees. The District Court held that the ordinance was not unconstitutionally vague or overbroad on its face, but the Fifth Circuit Court of Appeals reversed, finding that the ordinance was substantially overbroad, since its literal wording punished and might deter a significant range of protected speech.
