= The Harris School (Texas) =

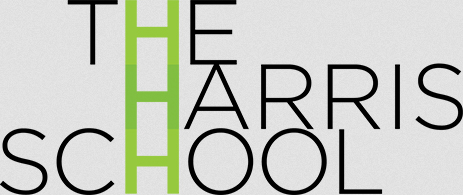

Location
- 6210 Rookin Street; Houston, Texas; United States; 29.712554°N 95.497930°W

Information
- Type: Private, non-profit
- Opened: 1987
- Executive Director: Susan Spencer
- Faculty: 12
- Grades: Pre-K through 6
- Enrollment: Maximum 45
- Tuition: $30,750 for 2016/17
- Website: theharrisschool.com

The Harris School is a non-profit private pre-kindergarten through sixth grade school in Houston, Texas. The school caters towards children with mental, emotional, or behavioral challenges.

== History ==
The Harris School was established in 1987 as a therapeutic preschool, founded by a small group of child therapists and psychoanalysts. The school opened a facility in the Montrose area in 1997. In 2007, The Harris School became accredited through the Southern Association of Colleges and Schools. The school moved to its current location in Southwest Houston in 2013.

== Program ==
The school serves about 30 students with emotional, behavioral, or mental issues. It focuses on early-intervention programs. In 2007, the school had 12 teachers.
