= 1977 Houston Anita Bryant protests =

LGBTQ protest in Houston, Texas

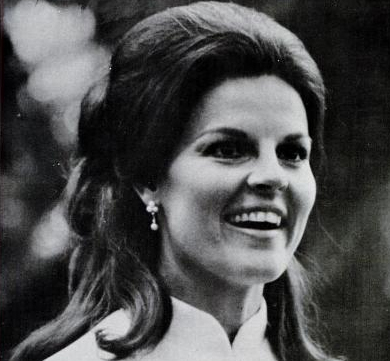
Anita Bryant

In 1977, the Texas State Bar Association invited country singer Anita Bryant to perform at a meeting in Houston, Texas. In response to Bryant's outspoken anti-gay views and her Save Our Children campaign, thousands of members of the Houston LGBT community and their supporters marched through the city to the venue in protest on June 16, 1977. The protests have been called "Houston's Stonewall" and set into motion the major push for LGBT rights in Houston.

== Background ==
Houston's LGBT community has existed since probably the beginning of the city, but did not take off in full swing until the 1960s. Montrose became the city's gayborhood, evolving into a center of gay culture. By 1968, 26 gay bars were located in Montrose.

Like for much of the United States, the 1969 Stonewall riots did not forward LGBT rights in Houston as much as they did in New York City, in part because Houston at the time was mostly considered a Bible Belt city. In 1970, a chapter of the Gay Liberation Front formed at the University of Houston but disbanded in 1973; another group called Integrity formed the same year. Political groups were also formed; the Gay Political Coalition formed in 1973 and advocated for anti-gay legislation to be repealed and protections to be installed. This was followed in 1975 by the Gay Political Caucus (GPC), which had much of the same goals.

One other event spurred movement within the LGBT Houston community. Harris County Comptroller of the Treasury Gary van Ooteghem attended a county commissioner's court meeting to support gay and lesbian rights in response to Leonard Matlovich's struggle in the United States Army. In the meeting, van Ooteghem publicly came out as gay, although his employer Harris County Treasurer Harsell Gray told van Ooteghem beforehand that he was not allowed to participate in politics. Van Ooteghem was dismissed from his position, an event that was widely publicized and led to van Ooteghem being elected the GPC's first president. Additionally, police raids on gay bars were common at this time. In 1976, police shot and killed Gary Wayne Stock, a bartender at the gay bar Inside/Outside, stating Stock had run a red light and was shot in self-defense. In the planning for the Anita Bryant demonstration every leader in the community participated. Designers created logos and fliers, Fred Paez and Ray Hill negotiated with the Houston Police Department for a non-confrontational and orderly event. Hill was assigned to co-ordinate the marshals and liaison with the police during the march and demonstration.

== Protests ==
The Hyatt Hotel in downtown Houston was chosen for the Texas State Bar Association's meeting on June 16, 1977. The TSBA invited country singer Anita Bryant to perform and speak at the meeting. Bryant was also an outspoken opponent of gay rights and had led a campaign called Save Our Children in Dade County, Florida to repeal an anti-discrimination ordinance that protected gay people. The TSBA distributed 28,500 pamphlets advertising Bryant's appearance. Many members of the LGBT community denounced the invitation, and it was quickly rescinded. However, shortly after a second invitation was sent to Bryant, inviting her only to sing; the TSBA cited a mistake that resulted in the second invitation being delivered. With the LGBT community not politically sound enough to prevent her from attending, Bryant was scheduled to appear at the meeting.

On the day of the meeting on June 16, 1977, Reverend Joe West held an anti-gay meeting at Houston City Hall. at 8:00 pm, about 3,000 protesters, consisting of members of the LGBT community and their allies, gathered in the Depository Bar parking lot in Montrose at the corners of Bagby and McGowen Streets. Members of the crowd wore black armbands with pink triangles. They then peacefully marched past the Hyatt Hotel to the Houston Public Library (HPL). There, then-publisher of The Advocate David B. Goodstein, actress Liz Torres, and founder of the Metropolitan Community Church Reverend Troy Perry addressed the crowd. By the time the crowd reached the HPL, numbers had grown to between 8,000 and 10,000 protesters. 10 attorneys in attendance walked out of the TSBA meeting and joined the crowd, themselves wearing armbands. The protest then turned into a candlelight vigil. Police in riot gear were stationed at the protest site. Inside the Hyatt Hotel, Bryant's performance received a standing ovation.

== Aftermath and legacy ==
Former GPC president Larry Bagneris called the demonstration "the first major political act that we, as gay people, took on in Houston." A minister at Houston's Gay Pride Parade in 1978 said, "It took Anita Bryant to bring this many of our brothers and sisters out of their closets." Gay activist Ray Hill stated, "Houston's gay and lesbian community actually became a community. Before Anita, gay community meant where the bars were; after Anita, gay community meant people."

More LGBT members subsequently became active in politics, and elected officials began searching for their input. In 1978, an event called Town Meeting I was held, during which Houston gays and lesbians met to discuss political and social issues they faced. By 1980, the community had gained an unprecedented amount of recognition, and gay ally Kathy Whitmire won the race for City Controller on a GPC endorsement.

The march itself eventually became the Houston Gay Pride Parade. It was also covered in Bruce Remington's 1983 thesis, "Twelve Fighting Years: Homosexuals in Houston, 1969-1981," which is one of the few existing pieces of literature about the early Houston LGBT community.

== See also ==
- LGBT rights in Texas
