= Verified Audit Circulation =

American media audit company

- Company type: Private company
- Industry: Publishing
- Founded: Los Angeles (1951)
- Founder: Geraldine Knight
- Defunct: Closed December 2022
- Fate: Chapter 7 bankruptcy
- Headquarters: San Rafael, California
- Area served: United States
- Key people: Tim Prouty (CEO)
- Products: Circulation audit reports delivery verification reports research
- Website: Verifiedaudit.com

Verified Audit Circulation was a United States company founded by Geraldine Knight in 1951 that conducted circulation audits of both free and paid print publications and of traffic figures for web sites. The company also provided custom research and verification of field delivery of products such as yellow pages directories, branded delivery bags, and door hangers.

As an independent audit firm, Verified Audit Circulation worked with publication circulation figures provided by their publisher clients, to verify or adjust these circulation numbers, based on examining a their printing and financial records. Field research was also conducted to confirm circulation figures. Circulation audit findings were compiled and released in audit reports, which advertisers used to make decisions about advertising placements.

As the advertising industry began its move to the internet, despite the lack accountability in that medium, the world of print publishing and its many associated industries began a rapid decline that brought us to where we are today.

On December 21, 2022, Verified Audit Circulation filed for Chapter 7 bankruptcy, and liquidated its assets.

== History ==
During the mid-twentieth century, traditional paid-circulation newspapers and magazines were joined by a new publication category: free-circulation newspapers and magazines, known as trade or controlled-circulation publications. As free newspapers and magazines increased in number, in 1951, Geraldine Knight founded Verified Audit Circulation as the first company dedicated to auditing these publications.

Subsequently, Verified expanded its services to include audits of paid publications, free rack-distributed publications, and products delivered to the door. The addition of web site audits provided site publishers with independent confirmation of site visitor activity and with assurance of web site ad delivery.

By 2008, the company was auditing more than 1,000 free and 250 paid publications, along with more than 100 weekly alternative newspapers. Its audit clients included The Washington Post, The Chicago Tribune, and Questex Media.

In 2009, Verified developed and launched an expanded form of integrated audit report to track a larger range of circulation and audience parameters for clients. The new report type addresses the growing diversification of media, beyond print and into electronic formats. The cross-platform audit report supplements print-circulation figures with data on digital editions, events, web sites, webinars, e-newsletters, and supplements.

During 2011, Verified expanded its circulation guidelines to allow publishers to include publications distributed at trade shows and events among their qualified circulation figures. Prior to the update, trade show and event distribution of publications counted as unqualified circulation.

== Membership ==
Verified clients are known as members of the organization, and they have full access to the circulation-reporting and member resources on the Verified Audit Circulation web site. Media buyers, advertisers, and advertising agencies are eligible for free associate membership, which provides online access to audit reports, publisher statements, circulation data downloads, and a Verified e-newsletter.

Verified Audit Circulation is headquartered in Larkspur, California.
