= Montrose, Houston =

Coordinates: 29°44′41″N 95°23′29″W

Montrose
- Neighborhood of Houston
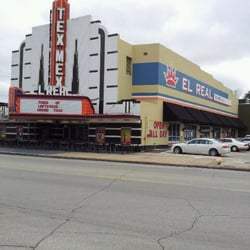
- Former Tower Theatre (later Acme Oyster House)
- Interactive map of Montrose
- Country: United States
- State: Texas
- County: Harris
- City: Houston
- Time zone: UTC−6 (Central)
  - Summer (DST): UTC−5
- ZIP Codes: 77006, 77019
- Area codes: 713/281/832/346

Montrose is a neighborhood located in west-central Houston, Texas, United States. Montrose is a 7.5-square-mile (19 km^{2}) area roughly bounded by Interstate 69/U.S. Highway 59 to the south, Allen Parkway to the north, South Shepherd Drive to the west, and Taft to Fairview to Bagby to Highway 59 to Main to the east.

Established in 1911, the neighborhood is a demographically diverse area with renovated mansions, bungalows with wide porches, and cottages located along tree-lined boulevards. Montrose is one of the major cultural areas in Houston notable for its hipster culture, art scene, food scene, and nightlife. From the 1970s to the present day, it has been the center of LGBTQ culture in the region. Montrose has been called the "Heart of Houston" and the "strangest neighborhood east of the Pecos".

The area forms the core of the city-designated Neartown - Montrose Super Neighborhood, and is adjacent to River Oaks, the Washington corridor, historic Fourth Ward, and the Museum District. It forms part of the socioeconomic phenomenon known as the Houston Arrow.

== History ==
Montrose, named after the town of Montrose, Angus, Scotland, was originally envisioned as a planned community and streetcar suburb dating back to the early 20th century before the development of River Oaks. Developer J. W. Link and his Houston Land Corporation envisioned a "great residential addition" according to the neighborhood's original sales brochure. Link's planning details for the area included four wide boulevards with the best curbing and extensive landscaping. Link built his own home in Montrose, known as the Link-Lee Mansion, which is now part of the University of St. Thomas campus. A streetcar, the Montrose Line, ran through the neighborhood. Link wrote: "Houston has to grow. Montrose is going to lead the procession." It did, and the procession eventually continued far beyond the neighborhood. Montrose was first platted in 1911. What is now the historical eastern core of Montrose is located in the southwest corner of the former Fourth Ward.

In 1926, the Plaza Apartment Hotel, Houston's first apartment hotel, opened on Montrose Boulevard. The hotel was home to many of Houston's leaders, including Edgar Odell Lovett, the first president of Rice University. Modeled after the Ritz-Carlton in New York, the hotel cost over one million dollars to construct.

Prior to 1936 deed restrictions meant that commercial uses were not available to sections of Montrose. When the deed restrictions lapsed commercial development increased.

Montrose in 1913, occupying the far southwest corner of Houston's then-limits.

During the 1960s and 1970s, Montrose became a center for the burgeoning counterculture movement, with street musicians, alternative community centers and hippie communes, head shops and artisans' studios proliferating. The corner of Montrose and Westheimer was the site of regular demonstrations against the Vietnam War. Street vendors sold Space City! and other underground newspapers throughout the area.

Thorne Dreyer and Al Reinert wrote in Texas Monthly in 1973 that the area "wound a tortuous course from Silk Stocking and Low Rent and back again." Gregory Curtis wrote in the same magazine in 1983 that Montrose was "the Montrose was at its peak as a community" but that it had declined since then.

KPFT – the fourth station in the progressive Pacifica Radio network of listener-sponsored stations – began broadcasting in 1970, and was joined on Lovett Blvd. by KLOL and KILT (Radio Montrose), pioneers in the underground FM format, creating a Montrose countercultural "radio row." KPFT's transmitter was twice bombed by a local Ku Klux Klan group, making it the only radio station in the history of the United States to be blown off the air.

The bohemian flavor of the Montrose would spawn both the Westheimer Colony Art Festival in 1971 and the subsequent street fair in 1973, which would become known as the Westheimer Street Festival. Also starting around the 1970s the area became known as the center for the gay and lesbian community of Houston. The area sported an estimated 30-40 gay bars at the time, including the Bayou Landing, thought to be the largest gay dance hall between the coasts, and several gay activist groups, including the Gay Liberation Front.

By the mid-1980s teenage runaways found a haven in Montrose, often engaging in prostitution. Local organizations were founded to provide outreach and support to these youths.

Folk music clubs like Anderson Fair and Sand Mountain catered to the folk scene in the neighborhood and other venues featured psychedelic rock and blues. Later, punk and new wave clubs like The Paradise Rock Island, the Omni, and Numbers opened in the late 1970s and early 1980s. Montrose has been "a haven for Prohibition honkey-tonks, antique stores, wealthy socialites, motorcycle gangs, gays, harmless eccentrics and a broad array of exiles, writers, artists and musicians." It has been called "a uniquely Houston kind of Bohemia, a mad mix made possible by the city's no-holds-barred, laissez faire form of growth."

In 1991 Paul Broussard was murdered in the Montrose nightclub area. University of Houston professor Maria Gonzalez stated that "With this murder[...]people said, 'Enough is enough.'[...] A whole new relationship developed between the gay community and the police department."

Since the 1990s, Montrose has become increasingly gentrified with a trend towards remodeled and new homes, higher rents, upmarket boutiques and restaurants. In 1997 Katherine Feser of the Houston Chronicle stated that "Montrose [is] not for starving artists anymore".

On June 6, 2006, a teenage MS-13 gang member named Gabriel Granillo was stabbed to death at Ervan Chew Park in the Montrose area. The 2011 novel The Knife and the Butterfly is based on this stabbing.

In 2025, the State of Texas ordered the destruction of the rainbow crosswalks in Montrose. The following year, at Mayor John Whitmire's behest, 10 Pride banners were installed along Westheimer Road.

== Culture ==
Montrose hosts a number of communities including artists, musicians, and the local LGBT community, and has thrift, vintage, and second-hand shopping stores, gay bars, and restaurants. On Montrose Boulevard and Westheimer Road, there are few original homes remaining—a majority have been converted to businesses and/or restaurants since 1936. Examples of Houston's historic residential architecture including century-old bungalows and mansions can be found in Montrose. As of 2026, the nightclub Numbers, which was established in 1978 and was "one of the most important venues operating in the '80s", remained a landmark of the neighborhood. In 2016, Numbers was named one of the 50 Best Small Music Venues in America.

=== LGBT culture and history ===
Before the 1970s, the city's gay bars were spread around Downtown Houston and what is now Midtown Houston. Gays and lesbians needed to have a place to socialize after the nightly closing of the gay bars. They began going to Art Wren, a 24-hour restaurant in Montrose. Around the time Montrose mainly included empty nesters and widows. Gay men became attracted to Montrose as a neighborhood after encountering it while patronizing Art Wren, and they began to gentrify the neighborhood and assist the widows with the maintenance of their houses. Within Montrose new gay bars began to appear. The Montrose Center and Legacy Community Health (founded as the Montrose Clinic) were both founded to serve the gay community in 1978.

By 1985, the flavor and politics of the neighborhood were heavily influenced by the LGBT community. Emblematic of this, The Houston Gay Pride Parade from its inauguration in 1978 to 2014 was held on Westheimer Road. At the time at least 19% of the residents of Montrose were gay and lesbian. In the late 1980s, AIDS affected many Montrose residents. Some area residents stopped patronizing restaurants in Montrose, believing that they would acquire AIDS from gay waiters. Some area funeral homes did not want to accept the bodies of men who died from AIDS. As AIDS ravaged the neighborhood the gay community flocked to the nightclubs for "a reprieve from sickness and death."

LGBT activists organized on KPFT radio in Montrose to wield political power, including rallying support for a failed discrimination ordinance in 1985. The murder of Paul Broussard occurred in Montrose in 1991, leading to community protests. The Houston chapter of Queer Nation held additional protests in Montrose in 1992 over reallocation of local AIDS-related funding. The intersection of Montrose Boulevard and Westheimer Road became a site of vigils, including one following the death of Princess Diana, and one following the murder of Matthew Shepard. A notable mural adorned Mary's Lounge on Westheimer from 1997 until the gay bar's closure in 2009. Hundreds of AIDS victims had their ashes scattered in a garden behind the lounge.

By 2011 many LGBT people moved to the Houston Heights and to suburbs in Greater Houston. Decentralization of Houston's gay population and the increasing acceptance of homosexuality in the city, and in society in general, caused business at gay bars in Montrose to decline. However, Montrose is still considered the epicenter of LGBT culture in Houston; bars line Pacific Street and the Montrose Center and Legacy Community Health continue to operate in large facilities in the neighborhood.

=== Museums ===
The Menil Collection, on Sul Ross Street between Alabama Street and Richmond Avenue, is a free museum founded by Houston philanthropists John and Dominique de Menil to house their art collection. The Menil was designed by architect Renzo Piano.

The Museum of Fine Arts, Houston is located in the Houston Museum District, in the surrounding area.

=== Chapels ===
The Rothko Chapel, also created by John and Dominique de Menil, is a non-denominational chapel located one block from the Menil on the campus of the University of St. Thomas. Fourteen black and color-hued paintings by Mark Rothko are on the interior walls. The shape and design of the chapel were largely influenced by the artist. Barnett Newman's sculpture, Broken Obelisk, dedicated to the late Martin Luther King Jr., stands in front of the chapel in a reflecting pool designed by architect Philip Johnson.

The Chapel of St. Basil, designed by Philip Johnson, is on the campus of nearby University of St. Thomas. It is faced with white stucco and black granite, and is operated by the Congregation of St. Basil.

== Cityscape ==
Dreyer and Reinert wrote in 1973 that "[g]enerally speaking" the community would be 7.5 acres (3.0 ha) of area within the Southwest Freeway (nowadays Interstate 69), West Gray, Shepherd Drive, and Smith Street; they stated there was no agreed-upon boundary of "Montrose" and that "residents are always arguing, with equal vehemence, whether they should or should not be considered part of "that place.""

== Infrastructure and government ==
=== Local government ===
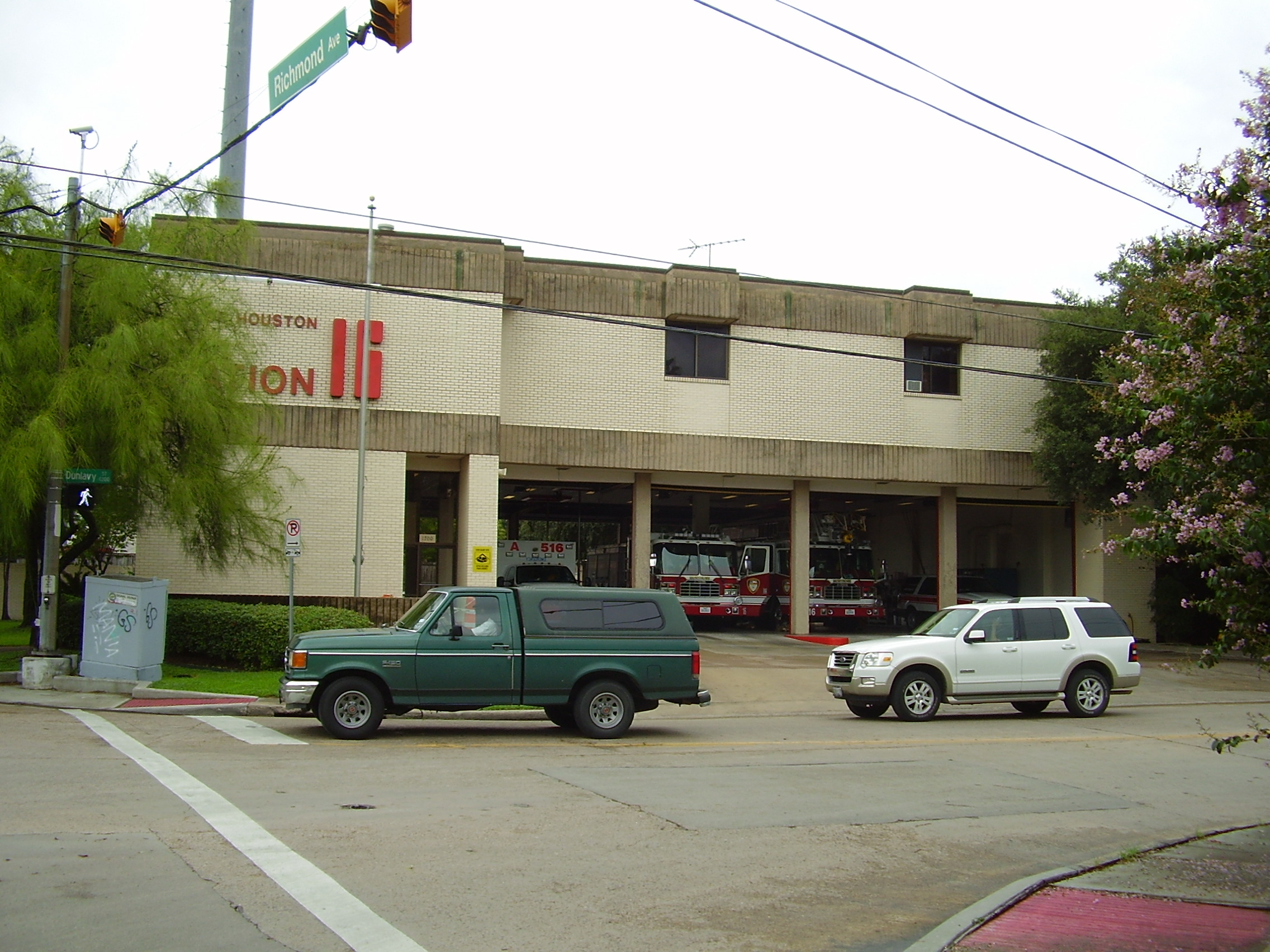
Fire Station 16 Montrose

The community is within the Houston Police Department's Central Patrol Division, headquartered at 61 Riesner. The Neartown Storefront Station was formerly located at 802 Westheimer Road. In 2019, there was an announcement that the storefront building, and therefore the storefront itself, would close as a result of a land swap between the City of Houston and a developer as part of a deal to develop a new library. The City of Houston purchased the building used for the storefront with federal community development funds.

Houston Fire Department Fire Station 16 serves the area. The fire station is in Fire District 6. The station opened at the intersection of Westheimer Road and Yupon in 1928. The station moved to the intersection of Richmond and Dunlavy in 1979.

Montrose is within Houston City Council District C. Because of the inclusion of Montrose, the Houston Heights, and the Rice University area, District C is nicknamed "hipstrict" referring to its progressive and urban ethic. Previously Montrose was wholly within City Council District D. In the early 1990s, Montrose was moved from District C to district D to avoid putting too many minorities in a single city council district. While Montrose was in District D, it was not able to have its own residents elected to city council. Instead the district was forced to try to influence electoral contests involving candidates from other neighborhoods. As 2011 city council redistricting approached, some members of Houston's gay community and some Houston area bloggers proposed returning Montrose to District C. Around 2011 an earlier plan would have combined the Heights and Montrose under a district called District J.

=== County, state, and federal representation ===
Harris County Precinct One, headed by Commissioner Rodney Ellis, serves Neartown. The county operates the Neartown Office at 1413 Westheimer Road.

Montrose is located in Districts 134 and 147 of the Texas House of Representatives. Ann Johnson represents the portion of the neighborhood west of Montrose Boulevard, and Garnet Coleman represents the portion of the neighborhood east of Montrose Boulevard. Montrose is located in District 13 of the Texas Senate represented by Senator Borris L. Miles.

After the 2012 redistricting, the community is now within Texas's 2nd congressional district. As of 2020, the representative is Dan Crenshaw.

Harris Health System designated the Northwest Health Center for ZIP code 77098 and the Casa de Amigos Health Center in Northside for ZIP codes 77006 and 77019. The nearest public hospital is Ben Taub General Hospital in the Texas Medical Center.

=== City of Houston Designated Historic Districts ===
As of June 2010, The Montrose was home to six of the nineteen designated Historic Districts in the city of Houston. These are Audubon Place, Avondale East, Avondale West, Courtland Place, Westmoreland, and First Montrose Commons.

=== Past elections ===
Montrose held the core of Mayor of Houston Kathy Whitmire's political support in the late 1970s and early 1980s. Montrose was the only area where a plurality of residents (40%) voted for her in the 1991 Mayor of Houston election. Montrose provided political support for former city councilperson and mayor Annise Parker. the first openly LGBT mayor of a major city in the United States.

== Economy ==
Montrose is served by major regional and national supermarket chains.

== Consulates ==
The Consulate-General of Norway was located in Montrose. The Consulate-General of the People's Republic of China in Houston was located in Montrose before closing in 2019.

== Parks and recreation ==
The Houston Greek Festival is held near the Annunciation Greek Orthodox Cathedral. The festival is usually in the first week of October and has been held for over four decades.

The Montrose Remembrance Garden, a memorial to victims of violent crimes, was established in 2011 at the intersection of California and Grant streets. Ervan Chew Park is a neighborhood park that allows dogs off-leash in a designated area.

== Education ==
=== Colleges and universities ===
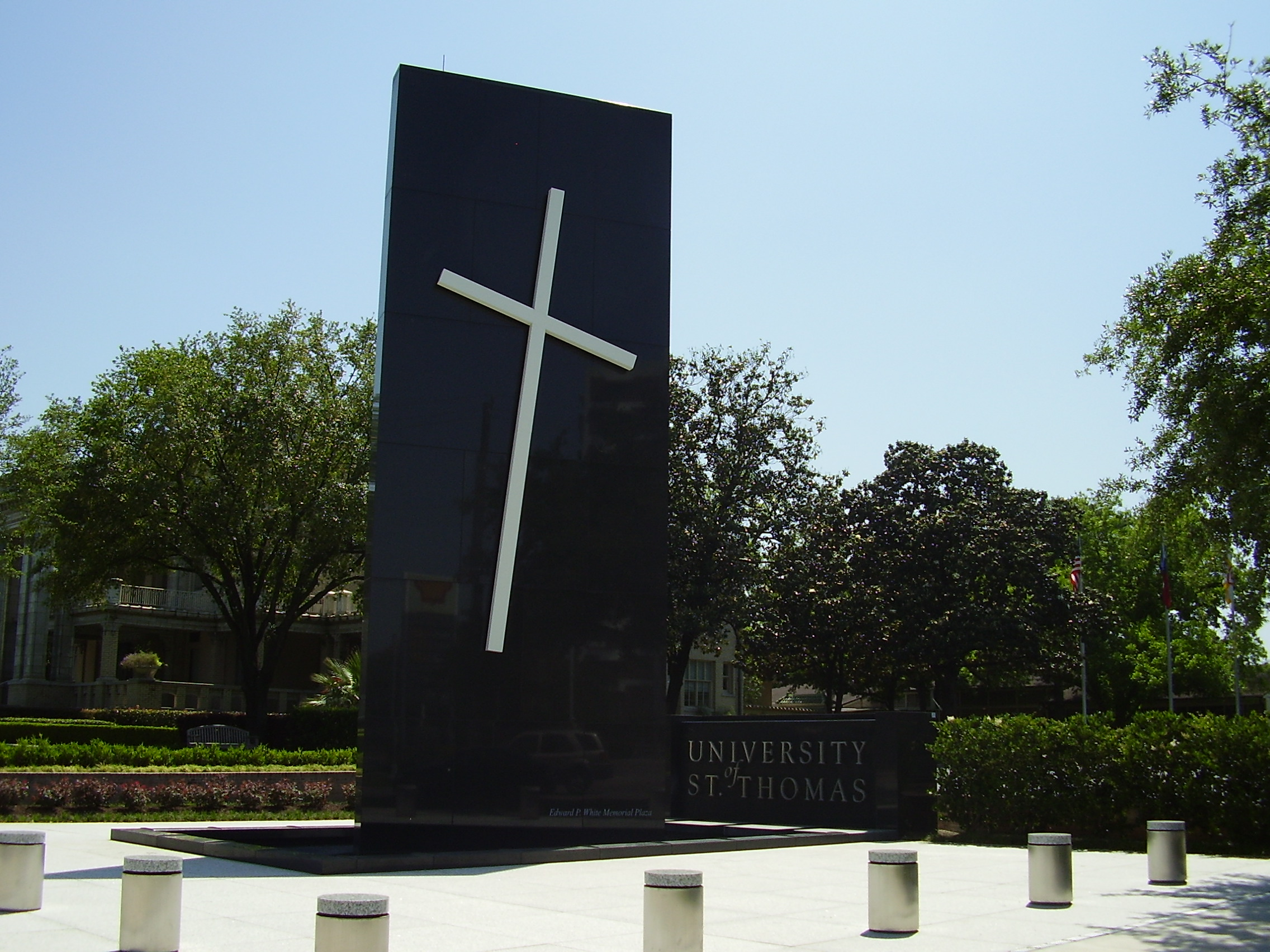
The University of St. Thomas

Montrose is home to the University of St. Thomas.

The service area of Houston Community College includes all of the Houston Independent School District, and Montrose is in HISD.

=== Primary and secondary education ===
==== Public schools ====
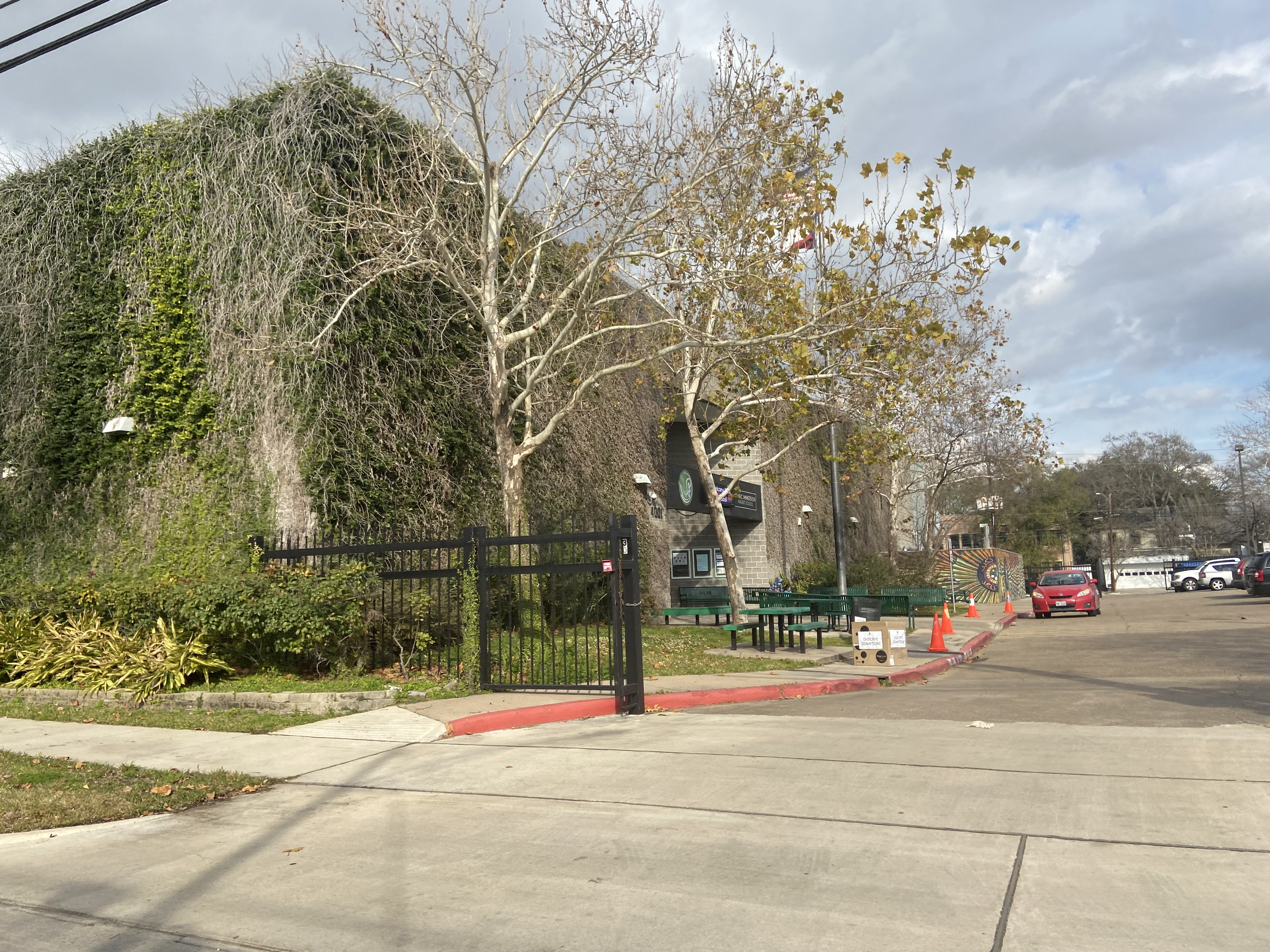
Arabic Immersion Magnet School, the former High School for the Performing and Visual Arts

Pupils in Montrose are zoned to Houston Independent School District schools. Montrose is in Trustee District VIII, represented by Diana Dávila as of 2008.

Baker Montessori School (formerly Wilson Montessori School), MacGregor Elementary School, Poe Elementary School, and Wharton Dual Language Academy serve separate sections of Montrose.

Pupils in Montrose are divided between two separate middle school attendance boundaries. Lanier Middle School and Gregory-Lincoln Education Center serve separate sections of Neartown for middle school. All Montrose pupils are zoned to Lamar High School. The High School for the Performing and Visual Arts, a magnet high school, was in Montrose until January 2019 when it moved downtown and in fall 2019, the Arabic Immersion Magnet School moved HSPVA's former site. Beginning in 2018 Baylor College of Medicine Academy at Ryan also serves as a boundary option for students zoned to Blackshear, Lockhart, and MacGregor elementary schools.

In 1973 Dreyer and Reinert wrote that in the 1930s the area public schools "were widely acclaimed to be the finest in Houston" and that by 1973, despite the demographic changes, the upper middle-class parents continued to support the public schools and that they had not experienced significant white flight to private schools; the journalists stated the schools were "among the best in town" in regards to inner city considerations.

Montrose Elementary School opened in 1906. It was later torn down and replaced in 1982 by the High School for the Performing and Visual Arts . Wilson Elementary opened in 1925, Lanier opened in 1926, and Wharton opened in 1929. Both Wharton and Wilson elementaries have fireplaces and chimneys given to the schools by Ima Hogg. As of 2010 the fireplace at Wharton was still displayed in public and used as a storytelling area.

In the 1970s Lincoln Junior-Senior High School, established in 1966, was the zoned secondary school for a portion of Montrose. Thorne and Reinert wrote that HISD officials at the time called it "the most successfully integrated school in the city."

==== Private schools ====
The Annunciation Orthodox School is located in Montrose. The Kinkaid School was located in the Neartown area until 1957 when the school moved to Piney Point Village. The Harris School was located in Montrose.

=== Public libraries ===
The current Freed-Montrose branch of the Houston Public Library

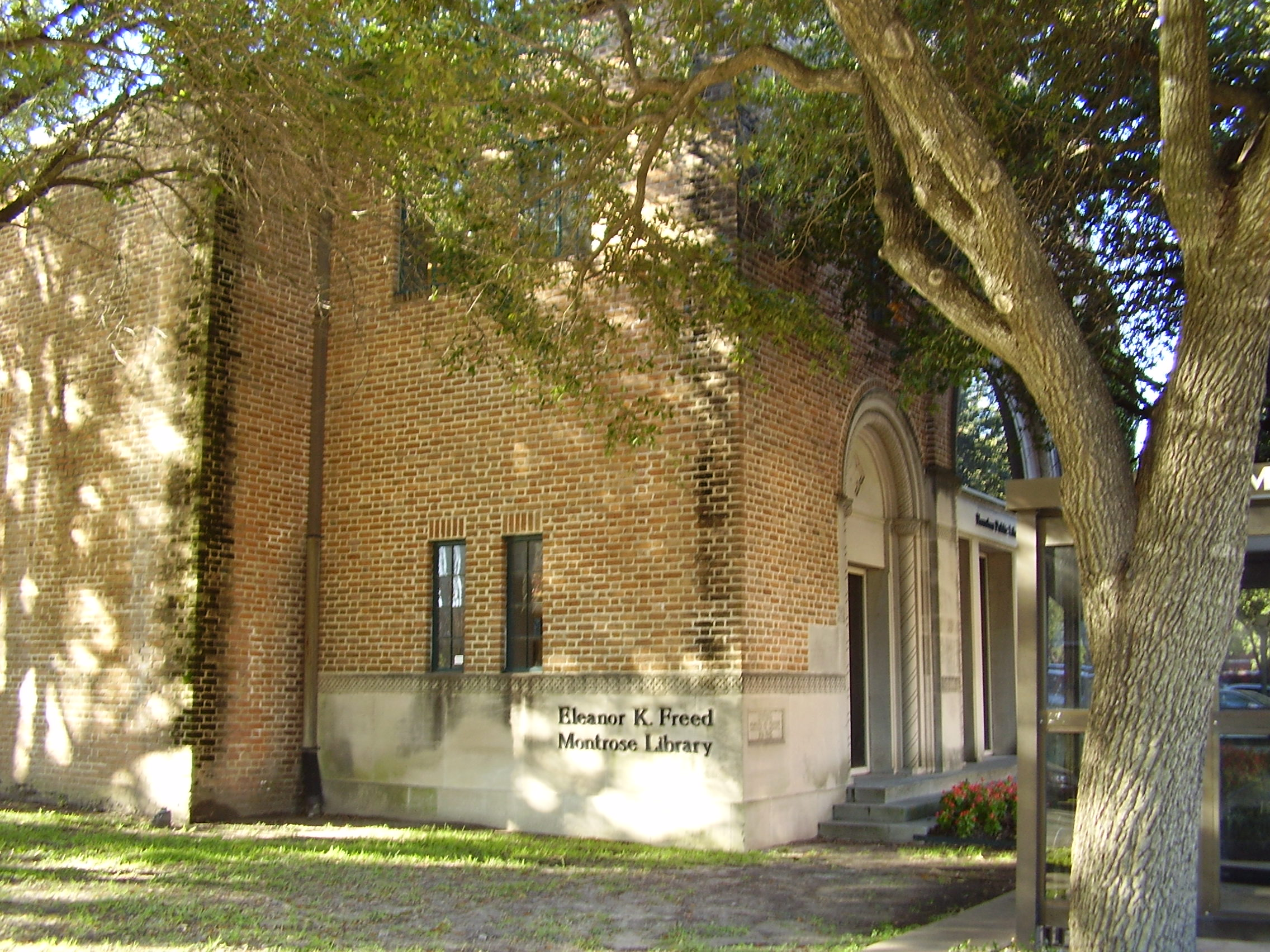
The former Eleanor K. Freed Montrose Library

Montrose is served by the Eleanor K. Freed-Montrose Library branch of Houston Public Library, located at 1001 California Street, the new facility for which opened in December 2024.

The Freed-Montrose branch was previously housed at the former Central Church of Christ, located at 4100 Montrose Boulevard. The building was marked by the former church's bell tower (campanile) and a small colonnade connecting the main church-library building to former church meeting rooms and offices. Facing Montrose Boulevard, the original stained glass window of the church could be seen featuring a dove with an olive branch in its beak. A modern office building complex in the surrounding area, known as The Campanile, references the former library and church's structure.

Renovation planning had begun by 2013. However, they were shelved upon consideration of the cost of upgrading the building's infrastructure. By 2019, the City of Houston opted to construct a new library facility along Westheimer Road. The facility was included in the multi-use Montrose Collective project. In March 2024, the library system closed Freed-Montrose, citing concerns about safety. After community objections, Mayor John Whitmire intervened to temporarily reopen the branch until its replacement was complete. The permanent Freed-Montrose in the new location opened on December 14, 2024.

== Notable natives and residents ==
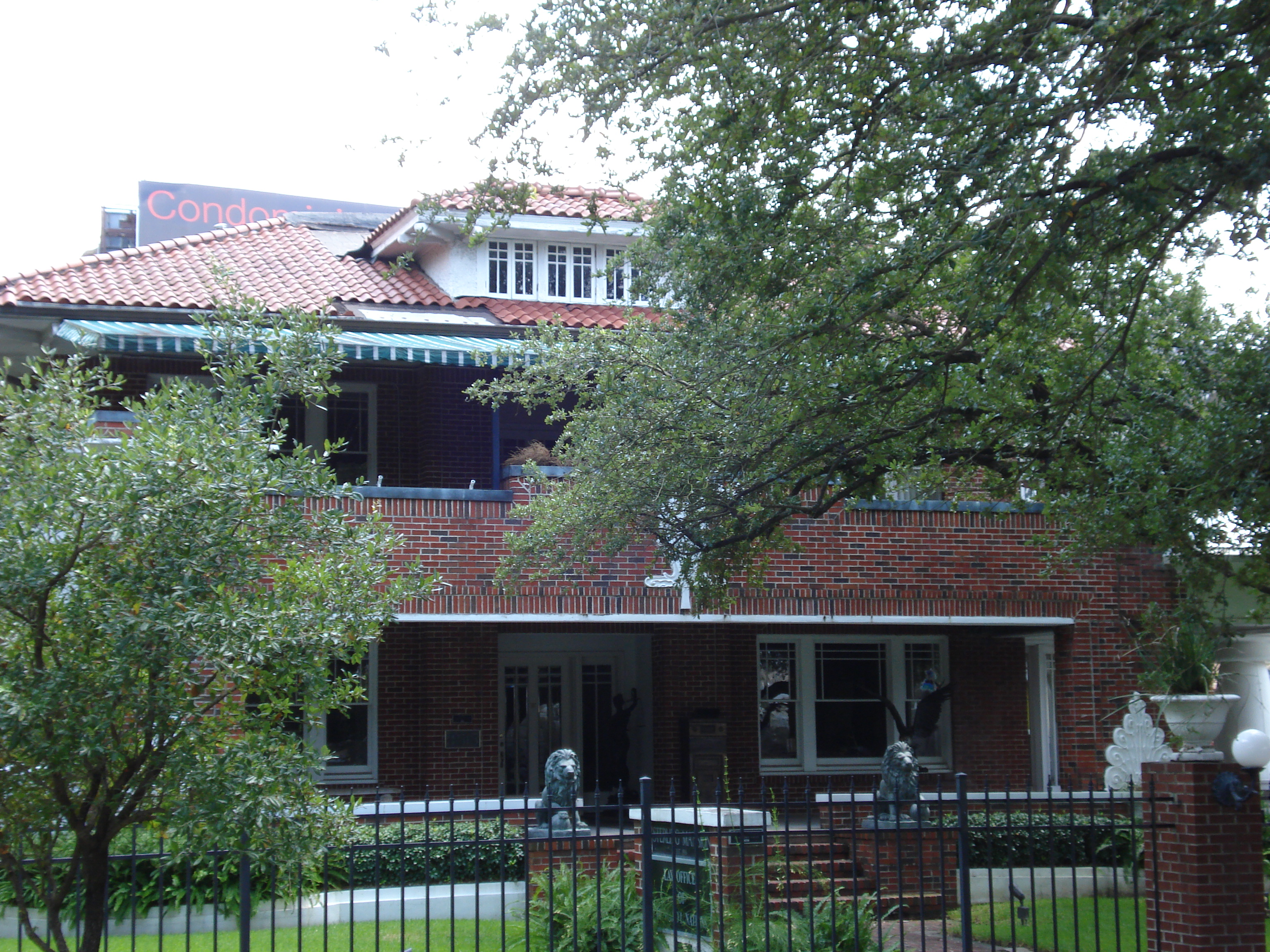
Ross Sterling's mansion in Montrose was built in 1916

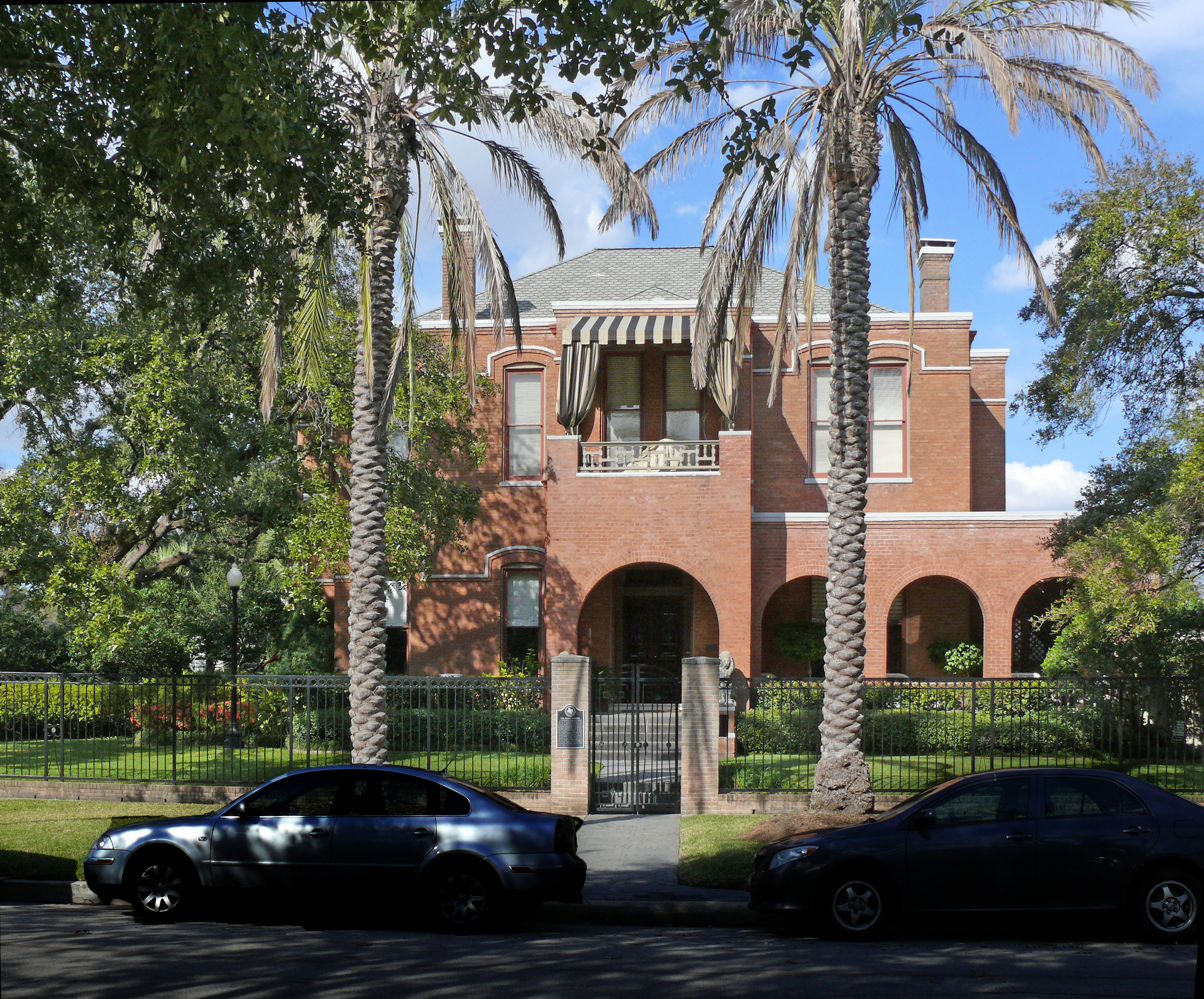
The Waldo Mansion in Montrose

- Carlos Correa
- Clark Gable studied acting in the neighborhood
- Howard Hughes's former home on Yoakum Street is now part of the University of St. Thomas.
- Lyndon Johnson lived on Hawthorne Street while teaching high school in the 1930s
- Sue Lovell, a member of the Houston City Council
- Annise Parker, former Mayor of Houston, former at-large Houston City Council member.
- William Sydney Porter (O. Henry) lived in Montrose while a reporter for the Houston Post
- Daniel Quinn, author of Ishmael, lived in Montrose with his wife until his death in February, 2018
- Don Sanders was known as the "mayor of Montrose".
- The mansion of Ross S. Sterling, originally located in Downtown Houston, was moved into the neighborhood. The Waldo Mansion is also in the neighborhood.

== See also ==
- History of Houston
- LGBTQ culture in Houston
