= The Prison Show =

News program and radio show for inmates

- Genre: Phone-in (radio), current affairs
- Running time: 120 minutes (Fridays)
- Country of origin: United States
- Language: English
- Home station: KPFT
- Hosted by: Ray Hill (founder)
- Recording studio: Texas
- Original release: 1980
- Website: theprisonshow.net

The Prison Show is a news program and radio call-in show created by Ray Hill to serve prison inmates and formerly incarcerated persons. It reaches approximately one-sixth of inmates in Texas, and in 2012 reached 14 of the 111 prisons in the state.

== History ==
The Prison Show was started on KPFT by Ray Hill in 1980, while Hill was General Manager of the Pacifica-run station. He hosted the show for its first 20 years. Hill began The Prison Show after realizing that it was not possible for inmates to make phone calls from prison. One of the founder's main goals, as a formerly incarcerated person himself, was to increase support systems for inmates. The show is completely volunteer-run. Ray Hill, a driving force behind the installation of phones for inmate use in Texas Department of Criminal Justice (TDCJ), retired from the program in 2013 and since that time it has been hosted by Hank Lamb who retired from the show April 29, 2023 and Dani Allen who is currently hosting alongside Producer David Collingsworth. Hill remained a trusted advisor and mentor for the show's leadership until his death on November 24, 2018.

The show continues to share pertinent news, success stories, interviews, important cases and issues, and to provide a platform for families and friends of inmates in the Texas Department of Criminal Justice to call in and have their "shout-outs" broadcast over the 90.1 FM KPFT, Facebook Live, many podcast platforms, YouTube and the incarcerated population can watch using their tablets on the Edovo App. for free in prisons across 45 states. The idea is to maintain as much family and community contact as possible, to assist inmates upon their return to society and make their time incarcerated more humane. In addition, the TDCJ Inmate "grape vine" can carry messages to units beyond its broadcast range and the program has callers from around the world weekly, as well as letters from across the nation.

Producer David Collingsworth and host Dani Allen, along with a team of dedicated volunteers, carry out the work started by Ray Hill and work to bring better healthcare, treatment and conditions for inmates and an end to the death penalty in Texas. Each week they have a steady rotation of guests who work towards those ends. Hill approved and supported their work right up until his death.

== Programming ==
The Prison Show features conversation about the TDCJ and other prison system issues, the justice system, death penalty, poor medical care, abusive summer heat conditions and other conditions for inmates, as well as court, junk science and evidence abuses and bail issues. Guests have included advocacy groups, attorneys, persons who work in the criminal justice system, substance abuse counselors, success stories of former inmates and more. Music segments include live performances by formerly incarcerated persons. The show also includes a call-in hour that allows family members to speak on air to incarcerated loved ones. This serves the station's main goal: connecting incarcerated persons with friends and family outside prison. Many proxy weddings are also performed on the show. Formerly incarcerated persons speak of the deep impact of being able to listen to the show while in prison. The show also works towards changing popular perception of prisons and incarceration.

The show traditionally started with Ray Hill saying, "Holler down the pipe, chase and rattle them bars, 'cause we're gonna do a Prison Show."

After Hill stepped down from 30 years of hosting the show, the hosting role was taken over by a few others, including Anthony Graves and Kathy Griffin, who departed shortly, and the role of Producer was assumed by David Collingsworth, at the request of Ray Hill. David Collingsworth and KPFT GM Duane Bradley appointed Hank Lamb host of the show.

== Advocacy ==
Advocacy work by The Prison Show was instrumental in changing Texas's policy on installing prison payphones. Texas was the last state to provide a way for inmates to make phone calls; it allowed this to happen in 2007. After 4 years of negotiation with TDCJ and Securus, The Prison Show was approved to upload content on the Edovo App so the incarcerated can view or listen for free without having to purchase radios. Edovo is currently available in 45 states for an approximate 900,000 incarcerated population. The show has also provided an opportunity to draw awareness to issues around medical care within prisons, or lack of basic necessities like air conditioning.

== See also ==
- Incarceration in the United States
