= Montrose Center =

LGBT health organization in Houston, Texas

the Montrose Center
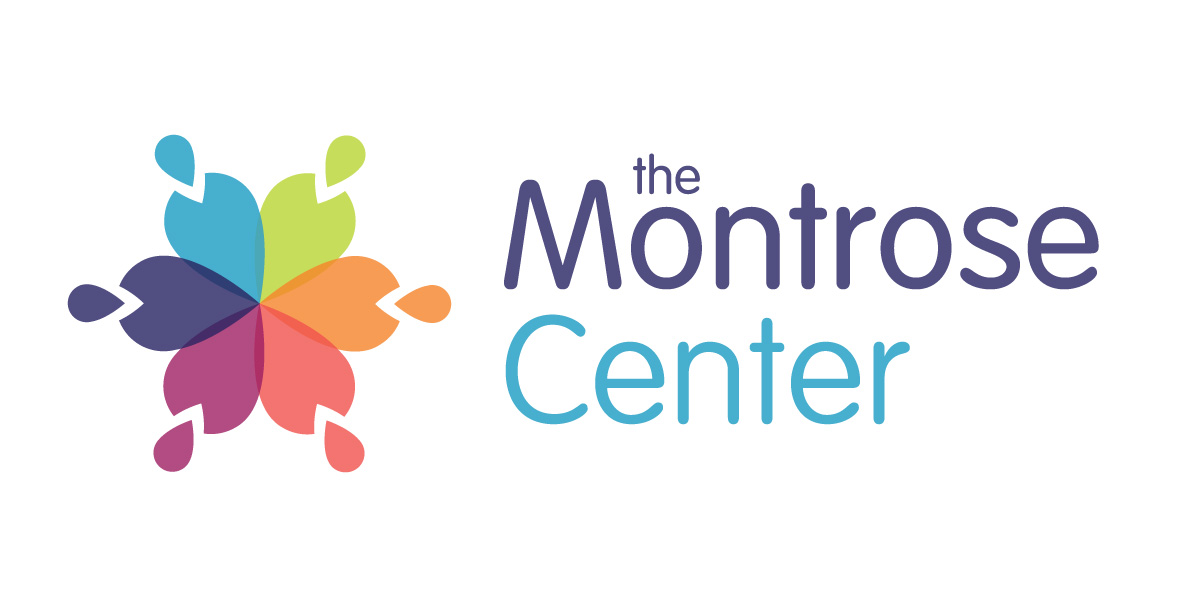

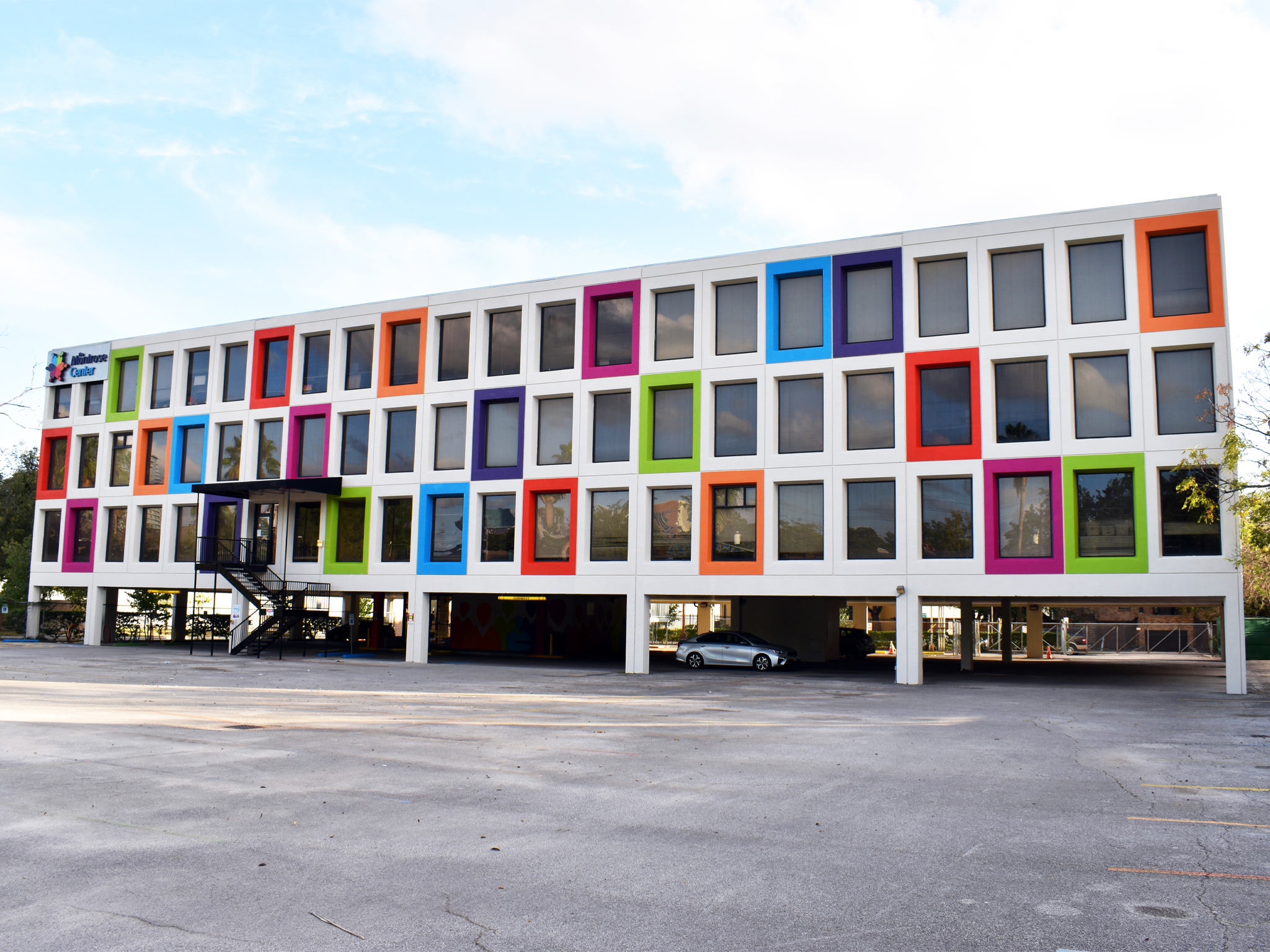
- Rainbow colored windows on the building's exterior, 2020.
- Former name: Montrose Counseling Center
- Established: 1978
- Location: 401 Branard Street; Houston, Texas, U.S.
- Coordinates: 29.736522°N 95.384539°W
- Type: LGBTQ community center
- Executive directors: Ann J. Robison, PhD
- Website: www.montrosecenter.org

The Montrose Center is an LGBTQ community center located in Houston, Texas, in the United States. The organization provides an array of programs and services for the LGBTQ community, including mental and behavioral health, anti-violence services, support groups, specialized services for youth, seniors, and those living with HIV, community meeting space, and it now operates the nation's largest LGBTQ-affirming, affordable, senior living center in the nation, the Law Harrington Senior Living Center. It is a member of the National Coalition of Anti-Violence Programs. It is in Neartown (Montrose).

== History ==
The Montrose Center opened in 1978 as Montrose Counseling Center (MCC), after the widely successful Town Hall Meeting I at the Astrodome. It began by offering primarily behavioral counseling and therapy for LGBTQ people.

The center faced many financial burdens in its formative years, particularly because of the high cost of providing health insurance for its employees living with HIV/AIDS. Then, in 1983, the Montrose Activity Center, another LGBTQ-oriented community center, gave the center $15,000 to keep operating. The center still struggled financially until 1990, when the Ryan White CARE Act was passed, and the center received funding through the act, allowing it to expand its services. It was the first behavioral health center to receive funding under the Ryan White CARE Act.

In the 1990s the center became one of the first places in Houston to offer temporary housing to gay men and transgender people. In 2013, the center changed their name from the Montrose Counseling Center to the Montrose Center, because they felt that they offered many more services than just counseling, and did not want people to feel as though they could only come to the center for mental health problems. Around the same time, the windows of the Montrose Center were painted in rainbow colors to represent that it served the LGBTQ community. The center also unveiled new logos for some of its signature programs.

In 2016, the Montrose Center was a target for protest by the Westboro Baptist Church. The group stated that they were protesting the Montrose Center because "[it] is an oozing, purulent sore of sodomite contagion: pushing proud sin and the proliferation of incurable disease". The Montrose Center urged people not to counter-protest the group, but to instead ignore them. Executive Director Ann J. Robison, PhD, also said she almost considered the group's visit "a badge of honor", and nearly felt proud that the group realized that the Montrose Center existed and was working for the LGBTQ community.

== Services ==
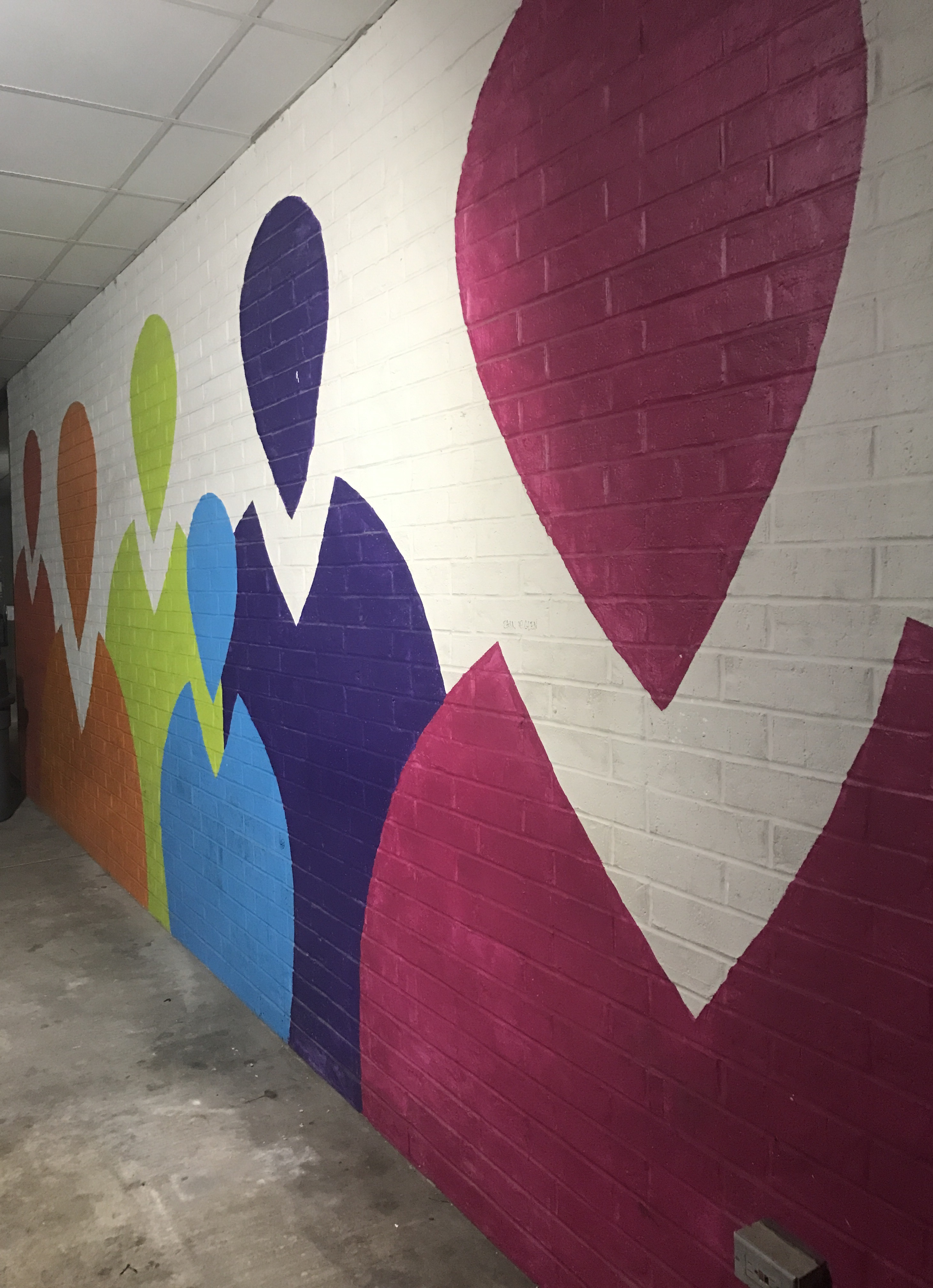
Wall art located on the ground floor of the center

The Montrose Center provides counseling services, group therapy, individual therapy, couples therapy, HIV/AIDS support, support groups, substance abuse services, hate crime support, support for those who experience domestic violence in same-sex relationships, and general wellness programming. It has services available in both English and Spanish.

=== Anti-violence ===
==== Domestic violence ====
In 2011, the Montrose Center was part of a report issued by the National Coalition of Anti-Violence Programs that addressed intimate partner violence for LGBT individuals. In the report, it stated that it had served 27 victims of intimate partner violence in the previous year, 52% of which were men, 44% women, and 4% transgender individuals. The Montrose Center believes it is better able to cater to men and transgender victims of domestic violence than other anti-domestic violence shelters, such as the Houston Area Women's center, as these people need separate space.

==== Hate crimes ====
The Montrose Center's anti-violence program began in 1991 as a reaction to the murder of Paul Broussard. The Montrose Center helps victims of all types of hate crimes, not just LGBTQ-related hate crimes. It provides counseling, case management, and court accompaniment to assist victims of hate crimes. In 2015, the Montrose Center reported helping 42 victims of hate crimes.

=== Health ===
==== Mental health ====
The Montrose Center began with providing mental health services to LGBTQ individuals as its mission. Over time, the center has added substance abuse treatment to its services. It provides outpatient care for substance abuse and addiction, in addition to substance abuse support groups or "12 Step Programs" as well as Recovery Dharma meetings.

=== Youth programs ===
One of the Montrose Center's cornerstone programs is its youth program, Hatch Youth. Hatch began in 1987 as a separate organization, but became a Montrose Center program in 2003. Hatch Youth supports LGBTQIA+ youth through social drop-in hours with educational programming, cultural events like a prom, and specifically deals with LGBT! youth homelessness. Hatch also works with LGBT! youth who have been victims of bullying, and works to prevent suicide or self-harm.

Out for Education is a foundation that provides scholarships for LGBTQ youth to pursue higher education. Founded in 1999, it is operated and funded solely by volunteers and donations. Hatch and Out for Education have given over one million dollars in scholarships to LGBTQ youth in Houston, giving many LGBTQ youths the opportunity to pursue higher education.

A study done that researched Hatch Youth found that those who attended Hatch programs felt they had increased social support and experienced a decrease in depressive symptoms, especially if they had been attending the program for more than six months.

=== Senior programs ===
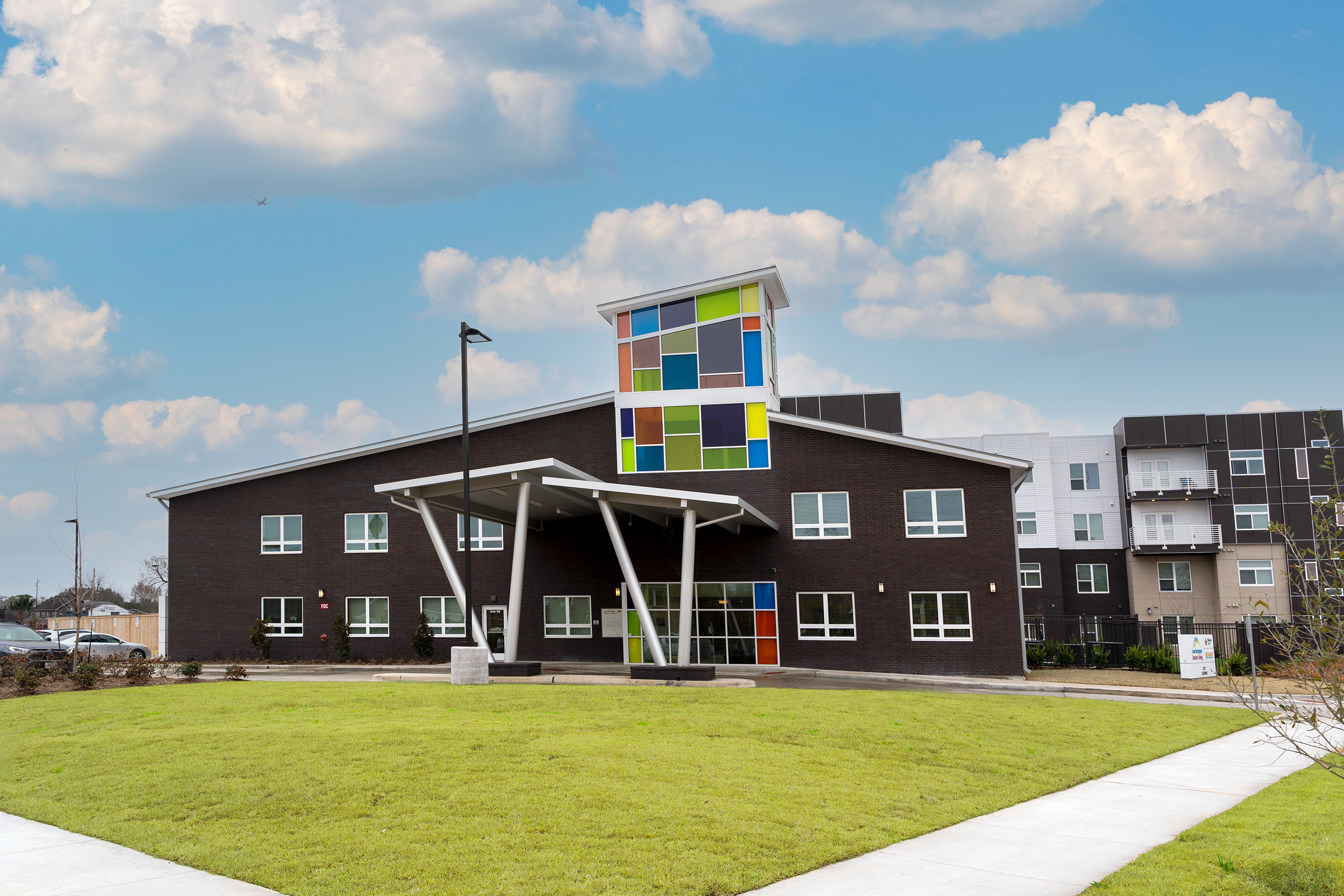
Exterior of the Law Harrington Senior Living Center

The Montrose Center has special programming for senior citizens, as older LGBTQ individuals often face various unique problems with accessing healthcare, assisted living, and general issues with retirement. The specific sub-organization for seniors is SPRY, or "Seniors Preparing for Rainbow Years," that hosts many activities targeted towards seniors. The Montrose Center even focuses on training people who interact with LGBTQ seniors outside of the SPRY program to recognize warning signs of senior depression and suicide. One event for senior citizens is "Diner Days" every Monday, Wednesday, and Friday, where seniors can socialize and have lunch.

==== Law Harrington Senior Living Center ====
In 2019, the Montrose Center began construction on an LGBTQ-affirming, affordable, senior living center in Third Ward. Named after activists Charles Law, PhD and Eugene M. Harrington, LLM, the Montrose Center completed construction on the Law Harrington Senior Living Center in January 2021. It is the nation's largest, LGBTQ-affirming, affordable, senior living center. The $26.5 million facility features 112 one- and two-bedroom independent living apartments and is open to low-income individuals and couples who are 62 years or older that meet income requirements.

=== Recreational ===
The Montrose Center offers services that are more directed towards community building and general recreation, rather than health or anti-violence.

One such service is through the now closed Equal Grounds café, which was a small coffee shop at the entrance of the building. The renovation to add the café cost the center $25,000. The café closed due to issues with staffing and maintenance. The café was initially planned to be named the Gayborhood Café, as Montrose is often referred to as a gayborhood.

The Montrose Center also offers free LGBTQ-friendly yoga classes. The classes are taught by volunteers, and serve as an inclusive space for people to release stress. In addition to yoga, the Montrose Center teaches free meditation and other well-being related courses.
