= KPFT =

Pacifica radio station in Houston

- Houston, Texas; United States
- Broadcast area: Greater Houston
- Frequency: 90.1 MHz (HD Radio)
- Branding: KPFT 90.1

Programming
- Languages: English; Spanish (select programming)
- Format: Free-form; Progressive
- Subchannels: HD2: Alternate programming
- Affiliations: Pacifica Radio Network

Ownership
- Owner: Pacifica Foundation

History
- First air date: March 1, 1970
- Call sign meaning: Pacifica Foundation Texas

Technical information
- Licensing authority: FCC
- Facility ID: 51244
- Class: C1
- ERP: 100,000 watts
- HAAT: 205 m (673 ft)
- Transmitter coordinates: 29°53′15″N 95°31′22″W
- Translators: 89.5 K208DG (Galveston); 90.3 K212FV (Goodrich); 91.9 K220KC (Huntsville)

Links
- Public license information: Public file; LMS
- Webcast: Listen live; Listen live (HD2)
- Website: kpft.org; KPFT archive

KPFT (90.1 FM) is a listener-sponsored community radio station in Houston, Texas, which began broadcasting March 1, 1970, as the fourth station in the Pacifica radio family. The station airs a variety of music, news, talk, and call-in programs, most ranging from center-left to far-left. Prominent persons who have been regulars on KPFT include science educator David F. Duncan and humorist John Henry Faulk.

== History ==
KPFT was established by journalists Larry Lee of the Associated Press and Don Gardner of the Houston Post after the two became disillusioned with the lack of reporting on racial issues by existing Houston media. Sam Hudson, the first Program Director at KPFT, described difficulty in convincing the Pacifica Foundation to establish a station in Houston, saying that the standard response by Pacifica to requests for new stations anywhere in the country amounted to "put [a radio station] on the air and give it to [the Pacifica Foundation]", and that the founders of KPFT followed that advice. The station commenced broadcasting on March 1, 1970, on the 90.1 FM frequency with the song "Here Comes the Sun" from the Abbey Road album by The Beatles.

From the beginning, the station emphasized the quality of its news programming; the station monitored the "A" news wire of the Associated Press, which was more in-depth and primarily used by newspapers, as well as a French news wire due to the wire's reporting on the Vietnam War, which was described by Hudson as "excellent".

The station chose to adopt a full-service radio format; KPFT's first evening news program, Life on Earth, lasted 90 minutes or less and focused on non-space matters, as other stations would broadcast space-focused programming. Afterwards, the station would begin broadcasting music, which was unusual for commercial broadcasters at the time. KPFT used the variety of its programming as a selling point; music programs included jazz, rock and roll, and opera, and talk shows were aired covering a variety of subjects, emphasizing freedom of speech. The station has always been non-commercial, initially asking listeners to contribute $12 per year to fund the station's operations.

Beginning in the mid-1970s, KPFT began airing multiple shows for the local LGBT audience, including Wilde 'n' Stein (1975-early 1990s) and After Hours (1987-early 2000s). In a 1979 episode of Wilde 'n' Stein, the hosts interviewed activists Larry Bagneris and Charles Law, and Tony Lazada, a former manager of the Stonewall Inn during the Stonewall riots. Throughout the 1980s, the station also aired a number of other programs featuring minority groups and languages, including news programs in Persian, music programs in Hungarian, and talk shows in Vietnamese. The station ultimately broadcast programs in more than a dozen languages.

In July 2021, Pacifica and KPFT management chose to sell the station's Montrose-area premises at 419 Lovett Blvd., citing "prohibitive" repair costs to the building. The station had been operating remotely since the beginning of the COVID-19 pandemic, and would continue to do so while the building was being sold. In May 2022, Pacifica and KPFT management announced the purchase of new premises at 4504 Caroline St. in Houston's Third Ward.

=== Violence against the station ===
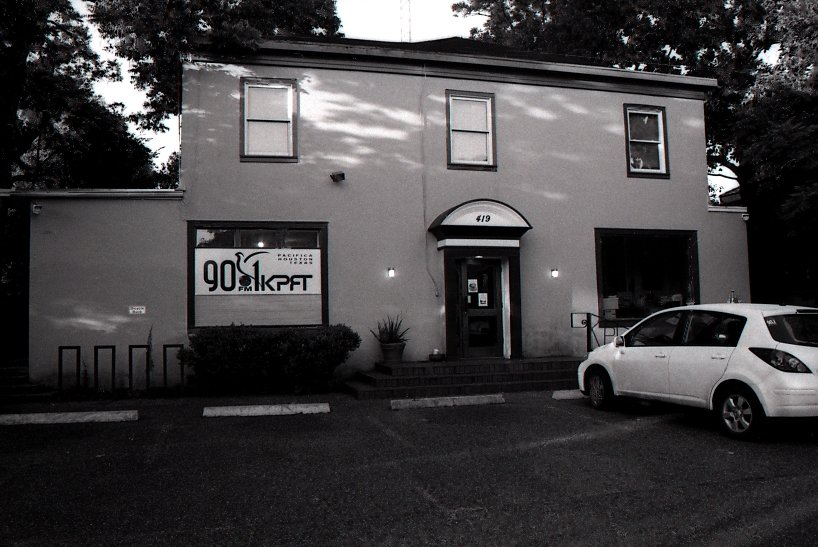
The station in Montrose (2008).

The station's transmitter was bombed and destroyed by the Ku Klux Klan on May 12, 1970, two months after going on the air. The new station was off the air for three weeks until it was repaired. Five months later, October 6, 1970, while the station was broadcasting Arlo Guthrie's "Alice's Restaurant," the transmitter was bombed yet again and the damage was significantly more extensive. The second bombing took KPFT off the air for three months. No other U.S. radio station or transmitter has been bombed.

On January 21, 1971, KPFT management invited Guthrie to visit the Houston studios, where he performed "Alice's Restaurant" live as the station commenced transmitting yet again.

After months of inactivity by the Federal Bureau of Investigation and local police, Pacifica took the initiative to mount a media campaign designed to draw attention to the unsolved case and seek support for pressuring authorities to act. Federal agents ultimately arrested a member of the Ku Klux Klan, Jimmy Dale Hutto, and charged him with the KPFT bombings, as well as with plotting to blow up radio stations KPFA and KPFK. Hutto was convicted and imprisoned in 1971.

Raj Mankad wrote at OffCite that the KPFT bombings in 1971 were part of a larger campaign of "threats and acts of violence against progressive and radical institutions in Houston," including underground newspaper Space City!

In the early morning hours of August 13, 2007, a bullet was fired into the studio, breaking a window and narrowly missing a woman's head, but no one was injured. The shooting followed a week-long fundraising drive. After the shooting, one of the windows was covered with the KPFT banner and the front entrance was locked.

On July 16, 2008, a man demanded access to KPFT's studios. After being rebuffed, he punched out a window pane on the back door with a knife. The man was apprehended without resistance, and was promptly arrested.

An assailant severed power lines to the station's transmitter on June 28, 2010, leaving the station's program available only to online listeners. Damages were estimated at $10,000. Power was restored the following day, and regular broadcasting resumed.

== Programming ==
The station currently broadcasts over 25 news and talk programs and over 20 music programs, both locally produced and syndicated.

Locally produced news and talk programming includes criminal justice-focused talk show The Prison Show, LGBT-focused talk show Queer Voices, news and local affairs shows Open Journal and The People's News, and political call-in talk shows Politics Done Right with Egberto Willies and Thinkwing Radio with Mike Honig. Locally produced music programming includes various roots programming; blues programming; specialty programming including jazz and electronic music; Zydeco and Cajun programming; rock programming; various international programming including Celtic, Bollywood, K-pop, and Latin music; hip-hop programming; and punk and metal programming.

Syndicated programming includes daily national news show Democracy Now!, weekday national news commentary show The Thom Hartmann Program, The R & R Show, Border Radio w/ Susan Darrow, and weekday national political talk show The Attitude with Arnie Arnesen.

KPFT was one of three U.S. radio stations to introduce Al Jazeera English with Pacifica stations in Berkeley and New York December 7, 2010. Past programming on KPFT includes Americana show Wide Open Spaces, a Monday-Friday Americana show hosted by Roark Smith, from June 2010 to May 2021; Soular Grooves, the weekly music show of recording artist DJ Sun, from January 1995 to May 2015; and Growing Up in America, the weekly talk show produced by the non-profit organization Children at Risk, from 2012 to December 2018.

== Broadcast Information ==
A diagram of the cities within the terrestrial broadcast range of KPFT.

KPFT's main programming is broadcast on the station's HD-1 channel at 64 kbps. Alternate programming is broadcast on HD-2, which radio listeners can only access via HD Radio. The station streams both channels live on its website, with past broadcasts of shows on both channels available on the KPFT archive.

HD-2 was formerly home to the student-run Rice University radio station KTRU, but fell silent after KTRU signed a deal in September 2015 to broadcast on the 96.1 frequency via a new low-power FM station located in southwest Houston. The then-blank HD-2 channel was soon replaced with the programming of the HD-3 channel, which was shut down.

== Notable people associated with the station ==
- Ray Hill - host of Wilde 'n' Stein, later a station general manager beginning in 1980
- Huey Purvis Meaux - staffer and host
