= Bayou Vista, Texas =

- City
- Interactive map of Bayou Vista, Texas
- Coordinates: 29°19′34″N 94°56′22″W
- Country: United States
- State: Texas
- County: Galveston

Area
  - Total: 0.45 sq mi (1.16 km^{2})
  - Land: 0.32 sq mi (0.82 km^{2})
  - Water: 0.13 sq mi (0.34 km^{2})
- Elevation: 3.3 ft (1 m)

Population (2020)
  - Total: 1,763
  - Density: 5,600/sq mi (2,200/km^{2})
- Time zone: UTC-6 (Central (CST))
  - Summer (DST): UTC-5 (CDT)
- FIPS code: 48-06060
- GNIS feature ID: 1381076
- Website: bayouvista.us

Bayou Vista is a city in Galveston County, Texas, United States. The population was 1,763 at the 2020 census. It received severe damage from Hurricane Ike on September 13, 2008.

== Geography ==
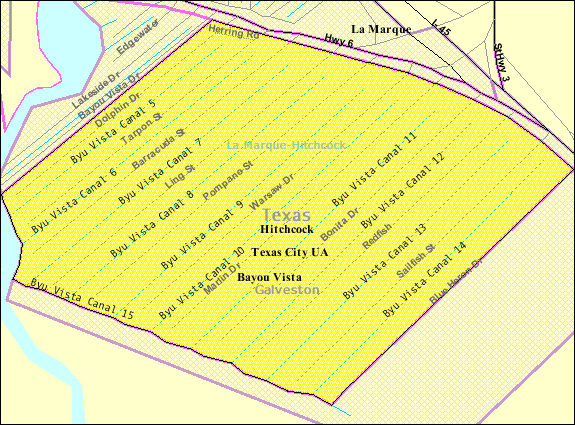
Map of Bayou Vista

Bayou Vista is located at 29°19′34″N 94°56′22″W (29.325979, –94.939502).

According to the United States Census Bureau, the city has a total area of 0.46 square miles (1.2 km^{2}), of which 0.31 square miles (0.8 km^{2}) is land and 0.12 square miles (0.3 km^{2}), or 29.15%, is water.

== Demographics ==
Historical population
Census	Pop.	Note	%±
1990	1,320		—
2000	1,644		24.5%
2010	1,537		−6.5%
2020	1,763		14.7%
U.S. Decennial Census

=== 2020 census ===
As of the 2020 census, Bayou Vista had a population of 1,763, 887 households, and 631 families residing in the city.

The median age was 56.0 years; 8.2% of residents were under the age of 18 and 27.7% were 65 years of age or older.

For every 100 females there were 103.6 males, and for every 100 females age 18 and over there were 104.6 males age 18 and over.

100.0% of residents lived in urban areas, while 0% lived in rural areas.

Among the 887 households, 13.0% had children under the age of 18 living in them. Of all households, 53.6% were married-couple households, 21.3% were households with a male householder and no spouse or partner present, and 18.4% were households with a female householder and no spouse or partner present. About 29.5% of all households were made up of individuals and 12.5% had someone living alone who was 65 years of age or older.

There were 1,091 housing units, of which 18.7% were vacant. Among occupied housing units, 86.9% were owner-occupied and 13.1% were renter-occupied. The homeowner vacancy rate was 2.7% and the rental vacancy rate was 3.3%.

Racial composition as of the 2020 census
Race	Percent
White	87.7%
Black or African American	0.7%
American Indian and Alaska Native	0.4%
Asian	1.7%
Native Hawaiian and Other Pacific Islander	0%
Some other race	2.6%
Two or more races	6.9%
Hispanic or Latino (of any race)	8.3%

=== 2000 census ===
As of the census of 2000, there were 1,644 people, 784 households, and 508 families residing in the city. The population density was 3,323.5 inhabitants per square mile (1,283.2/km^{2}). There were 926 housing units at an average density of 1,872.0 per square mile (722.8/km^{2}). The racial makeup of the city was 94.83% White, 0.55% African American, 0.43% Native American, 0.79% Asian, 0.06% Pacific Islander, 2.37% from other races, and 0.97% from two or more races. Hispanic or Latino of any race were 4.87% of the population.

There were 784 households, out of which 12.1% had children under the age of 18 living with them, 56.9% were married couples living together, 4.2% had a female householder with no husband present, and 35.1% were non-families. 27.0% of all households were made up of individuals, and 7.4% had someone living alone who was 65 years of age or older. The average household size was 2.10 and the average family size was 2.48.

In the city, the population was spread out, with 10.2% under the age of 18, 6.8% from 18 to 24, 26.9% from 25 to 44, 41.4% from 45 to 64, and 14.7% who were 65 years of age or older. The median age was 48 years. For every 100 females, there were 110.2 males. For every 100 females age 18 and over, there were 110.1 males.

The median income for a household in the city was $62,321, and the median income for a family was $70,114. Males had a median income of $52,045 versus $31,467 for females. The per capita income for the city was $30,495. About 0.6% of families and 3.1% of the population were below the poverty line, including none of those under age 18 and 3.9% of those age 65 or over.

== Government and infrastructure ==
As per a governmental agreement, Bayou Vista receives animal services from the Galveston County Animal Resource Center, an animal shelter operated by the Galveston County Health District in Texas City.

Galveston Area Ambulance Authority (GAAA), also operated by the health district, provides EMS services to this municipality.

== Education ==
Bayou Vista is served by the Texas City Independent School District (formerly by the La Marque Independent School District). La Marque High School is the designated high school as the LMISD school zones were retained after the 2016 merger with Texas City ISD. Bayou Vista is zoned to La Marque elementary and middle schools: La Marque Primary School, Hayley Elementary, and La Marque Middle School.

The former La Marque District (and the Texas City district) are zoned to the College of the Mainland.
