= Bill Gregory =

American football player (born 1949)

No. 77
- Position: Defensive tackle / Defensive end

Personal information
- Born: December 14, 1949 (age 76); Galveston, Texas, U.S.
- Listed height: 6 ft 5 in (1.96 m)
- Listed weight: 255 lb (116 kg)

Career information
- High school: Lincoln (La Marque, Texas)
- College: Wisconsin
- NFL draft: 1971: 3rd round, 77th overall pick

Career history
- Dallas Cowboys (1971–1977); Seattle Seahawks (1978–1980)

Awards and highlights
- 2× Super Bowl champion (VI, XII); Third-team All-American (1970); First-team All-Big Ten (1970)

Career NFL statistics
- Games played: 142
- Games started: 63
- Interceptions: 2
- Fumble recoveries: 6
- Stats at Pro Football Reference

William Penn Gregory, Jr. (born December 14, 1949) is an American former professional football player who was a defensive lineman in the National Football League (NFL) for the Dallas Cowboys and Seattle Seahawks. He played college football for the Wisconsin Badgers.

== Early life ==
Gregory attended Lincoln High School where he practiced football, basketball and track. He enrolled at the University of Wisconsin, where he was named the starter at defensive tackle as a sophomore and finished second on the team in tackles with 75 (48 solo).

In 1969, he was named a team captain. He led the team in tackles with 102 (58 solo), receiving honorable mention All-Big Ten and second-team Big Ten All-Academic honors.

In 1970, he was moved to defensive end, posting 53 solo tackles and 55 assists, receiving All-Big Ten and third-team All-American honors.

In 2007, he was inducted into the University of Wisconsin Athletic Hall of Fame.

== Professional career ==
=== Dallas Cowboys ===
Gregory was selected by the Dallas Cowboys in the third round (77th overall pick) of the 1971 NFL draft. He served mainly as a backup defensive tackle and defensive end, to some of the Cowboys greatest defensive players: Bob Lilly, Jethro Pugh, George Andrie, Larry Cole, Randy White, Harvey Martin and Ed "Too Tall" Jones.

He was a part-time starter at right defensive tackle in 1975 (6 starts) and 1976 (6 starts) behind Cole following Lilly's retirement.

In 1977, he suffered a knee injury in the preseason game against the Houston Oilers, which slowed him in the early part of the season, but he ended up starting the final 2 games for an injured Pugh and playing as a substitute in Super Bowl XII.

On August 28, 1978, he was traded along with a third round draft choice to the Seattle Seahawks, in exchange for a third (#76-Doug Cosbie) and a sixth round (#155-Tim Lavender) draft choice. The Seahawks traded the third round draft choice they received to the San Francisco 49ers, which they used to select future hall of famer Joe Montana.

=== Seattle Seahawks ===
In 1978, the Seattle Seahawks named him the starter at right defensive end and went on to register a then franchise record 9 sacks and also 65 tackles. The next year, he finished with 6.5 sacks and 64 tackles. On August 17, 1981, he was waived after playing for the Seahawks in 46 games (43 starts). Gregory's replacement at right end, Jacob Green, would go on to become the Seahawks' all-time leader in sacks.

== Personal life ==
After leaving football, Gregory worked for IBM until his retirement.
