= Louis Dupree =

Louis Dupree may refer to:

- Louis Dupree (professor) (1925–1989), anthropologist and expert on Afghanistan
- L. G. Dupre (Louis George Dupree, 1932–2001), American football player

== See also ==
- Louis Dupré (disambiguation)
