= Kent Branstetter =

American football player (born 1949)

No. 71
- Position: Tackle

Personal information
- Born: February 3, 1949 (age 77); Galveston, Texas, U.S.
- Listed height: 6 ft 3 in (1.91 m)
- Listed weight: 260 lb (118 kg)

Career information
- High school: La Marque (La Marque, Texas)
- College: Tyler (1968); Houston (1969–1971)
- NFL draft: 1972: 9th round, 216th overall pick

Career history
- New Orleans Saints (1972)*; Houston Oilers (1972)*; Green Bay Packers (1973–1974)
- * Offseason or practice squad member only

Career NFL statistics
- Games played: 9
- Stats at Pro Football Reference

Kent Branstetter (born February 3, 1949) is an American former professional football player who was a tackle in the National Football League (NFL). He played college football for the Tyler Apaches and Houston Cougars and later was a member of the New Orleans Saints, Houston Oilers and Green Bay Packers.

== Early life ==
Branstetter was born on February 3, 1949, in Galveston, Texas. He attended La Marque High School and is one of 11 of their alumni to play in the NFL. He played on the ninth grade football team as a freshman before being named starting fullback as a sophomore.

Branstetter also played linebacker, earning second-team All-District honors on defense as a junior while being first-team All-District on offense that year. In his senior season, he was described as "probably the finest defensive lineman in the conference," although he was limited due to injury and only named honorable mention All-District–South Zone at the position that year, additionally earning a second-team All-District selection at fullback.

== College career ==
Branstetter signed to play college football for the Houston Cougars but spent his first year at Tyler Junior College, starting for their football team at tackle. He joined the Cougars in 1969 as a sophomore and saw very limited action while playing as a linebacker, only playing for 12 minutes. He moved to defensive end in 1970 and ended up starting eight games at the position, helping them compile a record of 8–3.

Prior to the 1971 season, Branstetter was moved from his position at defensive end to defensive tackle. He started the whole season as their right defensive tackle and helped them compile a record of 9–3, being their second-leading tackler with 95 by the time they played Colorado in the season finale. Considered "the strongest Cougar of them all," according to the Tampa Times, Branstetter played in the Bluebonnet Bowl and was invited to the North vs. South Lions American Bowl, starting for the south team.

== Professional career ==
Branstetter was selected in the ninth round (216th overall) of the 1972 NFL draft by the New Orleans Saints. He signed his rookie contract in April, two months after having been drafted. At the start of his professional career, his height was 6 ft 3 in, and his weight was 255 lb. He left the team's training camp in July. In mid-August, he was signed as a free agent by the Houston Oilers. Branstetter was released at roster cuts later that month.

Branstetter received interest from the New York Jets, New England Patriots and Green Bay Packers after his release by the Oilers, and signed with the Packers in April 1973. He switched positions to playing on the offensive line with Green Bay. Playing offensive tackle, he was released at the final roster cuts but was subsequently re-signed to the taxi squad. He was waived from the taxi squad on September 13 but returned about two weeks later and was activated in October. He made his NFL debut against the Kansas City Chiefs on October 14 and ended up appearing in a total of nine games as a reserve. Branstetter was released at the final roster cuts in 1974, ending his career.
