= Harrison Guy =

American dancer and choreographer

Harrison Guy (born La Marque, Texas) is a dancer, choreographer, and activist who founded the Urban Souls Dance Company. In 2019, Guy became the first Black male grand marshal of the Pride Houston parade.

== Biography ==
At age eight, Guy began learning tap dance before going on to study various dance styles. He graduated from La Marque High School, where he was the first homecoming king, and attended Prairie View A&M University. Guy left during his junior year to study in New York with the Alvin Ailey American Dance Theater. After returning to Houston in 2001, he offered free classes for dance students at a theatre and dance performance space known as The Barn.

In 2004, Guy founded Urban Souls Dance Company with fellow dance teacher Walter Hull. Urban Souls examines "real life stories that connect to true human emotions."

Guy met his husband Adrian Homer in 2007 during a fraternity community service activity. They married in 2017 at the University of Houston.

== Activism ==
Guy began his activism career in 2015 with the Donald R. Watkins Memorial Foundation, an HIV prevention agency. He was the LGBTQ community coordinator for the Houston NAACP, and both national vice president and southern regional director of Delta Phi Upsilon fraternity. Guy was on the LGBT Advisory Board for the Democratic National Committee and the diversity committee for Pride Houston, which organizes the annual Pride parade.

Guy founded Gatekeepers in 2018 to support Black activism and social activity. The organization worked to establish a historical marker in Montrose, Houston that would highlight the neighborhood's LGBTQ history.

In 2019, Guy founded The Black LGBTQ Houston History & Heritage Project—Charles Law Community Archive at the African American Library at the Gregory School, also known as the Charles Law Community Archive. The archive, launched on February 21, 2019, was named after Dr. Walter Charles Law, a former archivist at Texas Southern University. Dr. Law also founded The Houston Committee, a professional organization for Black gay men which was active during the 1970s and 1980s.

== Accolades ==
Guy was appointed as co-chair of Houston Mayor Sylvester Turner's LGBTQ Advisory Board in 2017 in the wake of the Pulse nightclub shooting. He was appointed as Houston Pride's Male Grand Marshal in 2019. He was the first Black male to be appointed as grand marshal. In 2020, he was selected as the Rice University Center for Engaged Research and Collaborate Learning (CERCL) Artist in Residence at the university's Moody Center for the Arts.
