= L. J. Castile =

American gridiron football player (born 1987)

L.J. Castile
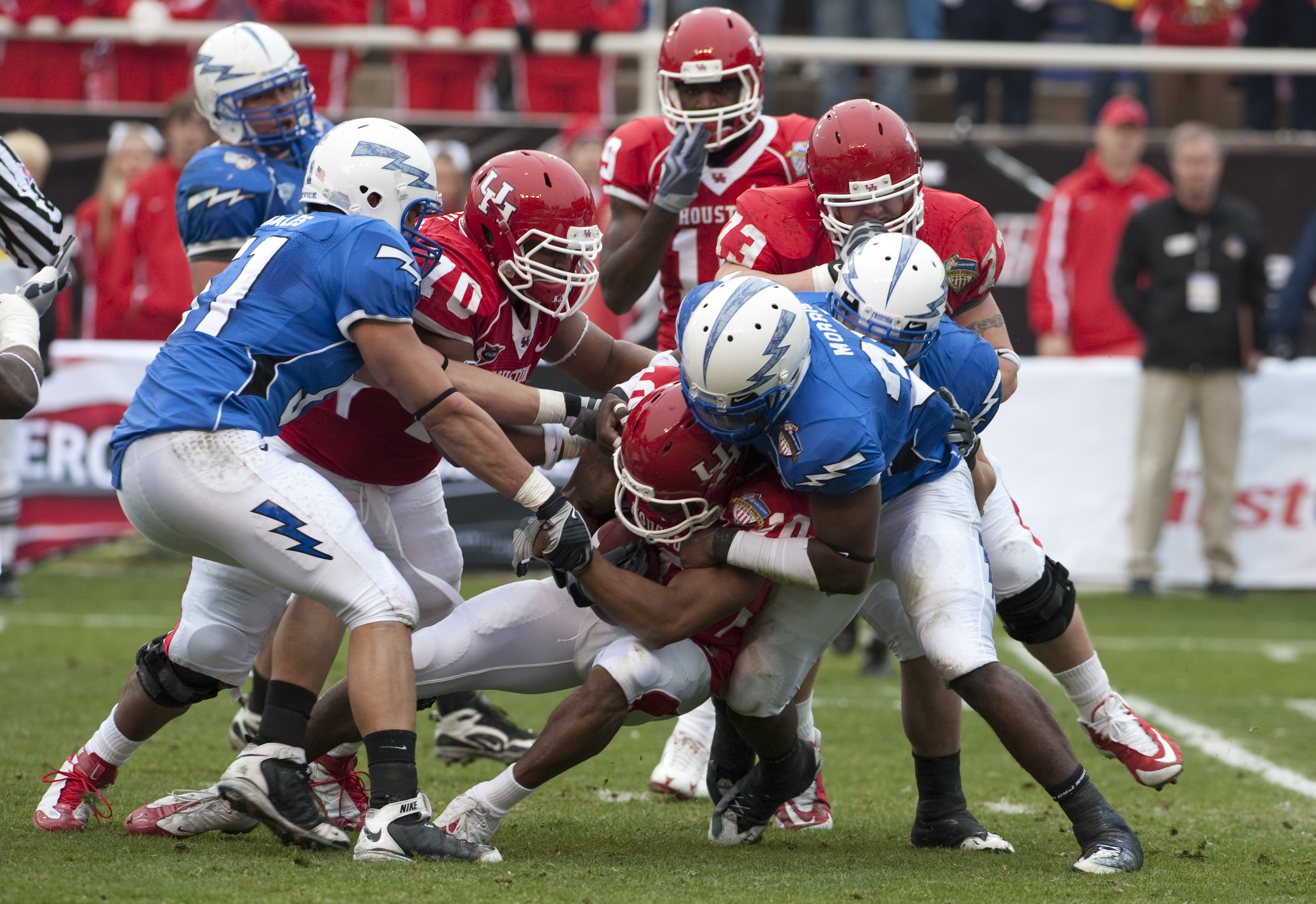
- Castile is tackled during a game against Air Force.

Idaho Horsemen
- Position: Wide receiver
- Roster status: Active
- CFL status: American

Personal information
- Born: September 7, 1987 (age 39); La Marque, Texas, U.S.
- Listed height: 6 ft 3 in (1.91 m)
- Listed weight: 220 lb (100 kg)

Career information
- High school: La Marque (La Marque, Texas)
- College: Houston (2007–2009); Delta State (2010)
- NFL draft: 2011: undrafted

Career history
- New Orleans VooDoo (2011); Cleveland Browns (2011)*; Saskatchewan Roughriders (2011); New Orleans VooDoo (2012); Utah Blaze (2013); New Orleans VooDoo (2013–2014); Chicago Slaughter (2014)*; Los Angeles KISS (2014–2015); Edmonton Eskimos (2014)*; Ottawa Redblacks (2014–2015)*; Jacksonville Sharks (2016)*; Bloomington Edge (2017); Washington Valor (2017); Georgia Doom (2018); Orlando Predators (2019); New York Streets (2019); Oregon High Desert Storm (2021–2022); Idaho Horsemen (2023–present)
- * Offseason or practice squad member only

Career AFL statistics
- Receptions: 236
- Yards: 2,983
- Touchdowns: 72
- Stats at ArenaFan.com
- Stats at Pro Football Reference
- Stats at CFL.ca (archive)

Le'Nard Damon Castile, Jr (born September 7, 1987) is an American professional football wide receiver for the Idaho Horsemen of the National Arena League. He was assigned to the New Orleans VooDoo after going undrafted in the 2011 NFL draft. He played college football for the Houston Cougars and the Delta State Statesmen.

== Early life ==
Castile attended La Marque High School in La Marque, Texas. Playing quarterback as a senior on the school's football team, PrepStar named him to an All-Region team. He was listed as a three-star recruit by Scout.com and Rivals.com. He was listed as a top 100 recruit in the state of Texas by the Houston Chronicle and the Fort Worth Star-Telegram, and the Galveston Daily News named him first-team all-country. His team finished with a 13–1 record, winning a regional championship. In his senior year, Castile recorded 1,155 passing yards and 17 touchdowns; he also rushed for 718 yards and 11 touchdowns. Castile also played basketball for his high school team.

== College career ==
=== Houston ===
Castile continued his athletic career with the Houston Cougars as a wide receiver. His first year, he redshirted, then he lettered three seasons (2007–2009). He made his collegiate debut against the Oregon Ducks in 2007. For his career with the Cougars, had 60 receptions for 854 yards and 16 touchdowns, while accounting for three blocked kicks.

=== Delta State ===
In 2010, Castile transferred to play for the Delta State Statesmen. That season, Delta State reached the NCAA Division II national championship game, losing to the Minnesota–Duluth Bulldogs. Castile's 67 receptions, 900 receiving yards, and 13 touchdowns led all Delta State receivers for the season. He was selected to play in the Cactus Bowl, recording three receptions for 122 yards and a touchdown.

== Professional career ==
=== New Orleans VooDoo ===
Castile signed with the New Orleans VooDoo on June 21, 2011.

=== Cleveland Browns ===
He signed with the Cleveland Browns for training camp.

=== Utah Blaze ===
Castile signed with the Utah Blaze for the 2013 season.

=== Return to New Orleans VooDoo ===
On May 15, 2013, The Blaze traded Castile to the VooDoo, along with Bryce Tennison, for future considerations.

=== Chicago Slaughter ===
On December 5, 2013, Castile signed with the Chicago Slaughter of the Continental Indoor Football League (CIFL). When the Slaughter folded, he re-joined the VooDoo.

=== Los Angeles KISS ===
On June 19, 2014, Castile was traded to the Los Angeles KISS for future considerations. On July 16, 2015, Castile was activated by the KISS.

=== Ottawa Redblacks ===
Castile was signed to the Ottawa Redblacks practice roster on September 29, 2014. On June 5, 2015, Castile was released.

=== Jacksonville Sharks ===
On March 10, 2016, Castile was assigned to the Jacksonville Sharks. On March 25, 2016, Castile was placed on recallable reassignment.

=== Bloomington Edge ===
On October 31, 2016, Castile was assigned to the Bloomington Edge. He was released on April 5, 2017.

=== Washington Valor ===
On June 1, 2017, Castile was assigned to the Washington Valor. On July 7, 2017, Castile was placed on reassignment. On July 12, 2017, Castile was placed on league suspension.

=== Georgia Doom ===
Castile signed with the Georgia Doom for the 2018 season.
