= Texas City High School =

Public school in Texas, United States

Location
- 1431 9th Avenue North, Texas City, TX 77590; Texas City, Galveston, Texas 77590; United States
- Coordinates: 29.3935546°N 94.91500539999998°W

Information
- School type: Public
- Established: 1952
- Locale: Suburb
- School district: Texas City School District
- Superintendent: Dr. Melissa Duart
- Principal: Lincoln Hypolite
- Teaching staff: 115.73 (FTE)
- Gender: Coed
- Enrollment: 1,721 (2023-2024)
- Student to teacher ratio: 14.87
- Color: Orange Black
- Fight song: "All hail to TC High School"
- Athletics conference: University Interscholastic League
- Team name: Stingarees & Lady Stingarees
- Communities served: Texas City
- Feeder schools: Blocker Middle School
- Website: tchs.tcisd.org

Texas City High School (TCHS) is a public high school in Texas City, Texas, in the Greater Houston area. It is one of two high schools in the Texas City Independent School District (TCISD), the other being La Marque High School.

The main school building for Texas City High opened in 1952. Another building for Texas City High opened in 1957, and the previous one became Blocker Junior High School.

As of September 2021, Texas City High School had 1,791 students.

== Academics ==
Texas City High School is ranked #11,174 in the National Rankings and ranked #1,036 within Texas, according to U.S. News & World Report. 58% of students are proficient in Reading, while 69% of students are proficient in Mathematics. TCHS' student graduation rate is 88%.

== Athletics ==
Texas City High School competes as a member of the University Interscholastic League who creates rules for and administers almost all athletic, musical, and academic contests for public primary and secondary schools in the U.S. state of Texas. Teams are called the "Stingarees" or "Stings" for short. Colors are Orange and Black.

The school sponsors interscholastic teams for young men and women in Tennis, Track & Field, Cross Country, Swimming & Diving/Water Polo, Soccer, Powerlifting, and Basketball. Young women may compete in Volleyball and Softball, while young men may compete in Football, Wrestling, Golf, and Baseball.

== Demographics ==
The racial makeup of TCHS was 42% Hispanic, 32% Caucasian, 23% African American, 2% Mixed-Race, 1% Native American, 0.4 Asian American, and 0.3% Native Hawaiian/Pacific Islander.

== Feeder patterns ==
Guajardo, Heights, Roosevelt-Wilson, and Kohfeldt elementaries, Levy-Fry Intermediate School, and Blocker Middle School feed into Texas City High.

== Notable alumni ==
- Almighty Jay (formerly known as YBN Almighty Jay) professional rapper
- Chris Ballard, General Manager, Indianapolis Colts
- Nichole Cordova, professional singer
- Vernon Crawford, former NFL player
- Matt Deggs, Head Baseball Coach, University of Louisiana at Lafayette, Ragin' Cajuns
- Dion Dowell, former professional basketball player
- Charlie Dupre, former NFL player
- L. G. Dupre, former NFL player
- D'Onta Foreman, NFL player
- John Lee Hancock, film director and producer
- Max Hopper, former CIO Bank of America
- Edie Patterson, actor and comedian
- Chuck Quilter, former NFL player
- Reggie Rusk, former NFL player
- Diron Talbert, former NFL player
- Don Talbert, former NFL player
