= Tiki Island, Texas =

Tiki Island
- Village
- Village of Tiki Island
- Location of Tiki Island, Texas
- Coordinates: 29°17′56″N 94°54′52″W
- Country: United States
- State: Texas
- County: Galveston

Government
  - Mayor: Goldie Telcheck

Area
  - Total: 1.59 sq mi (4.12 km^{2})
  - Land: 0.47 sq mi (1.23 km^{2})
  - Water: 1.12 sq mi (2.89 km^{2})
- Elevation: 0 ft (0 m)

Population (2020)
  - Total: 1,106
  - Density: 2,323.5/sq mi (897.12/km^{2})
- Time zone: UTC−06:00 (Central (CST))
  - Summer (DST): UTC−05:00 (CDT)
- ZIP Code: 77554
- Area code: 409
- FIPS code: 48-72989
- GNIS feature ID: 1388537
- Website: villageoftikiisland.gov

Tiki Island is a village in Galveston County, Texas, United States. The population was 1,106 at the 2020 census.

== History and government ==
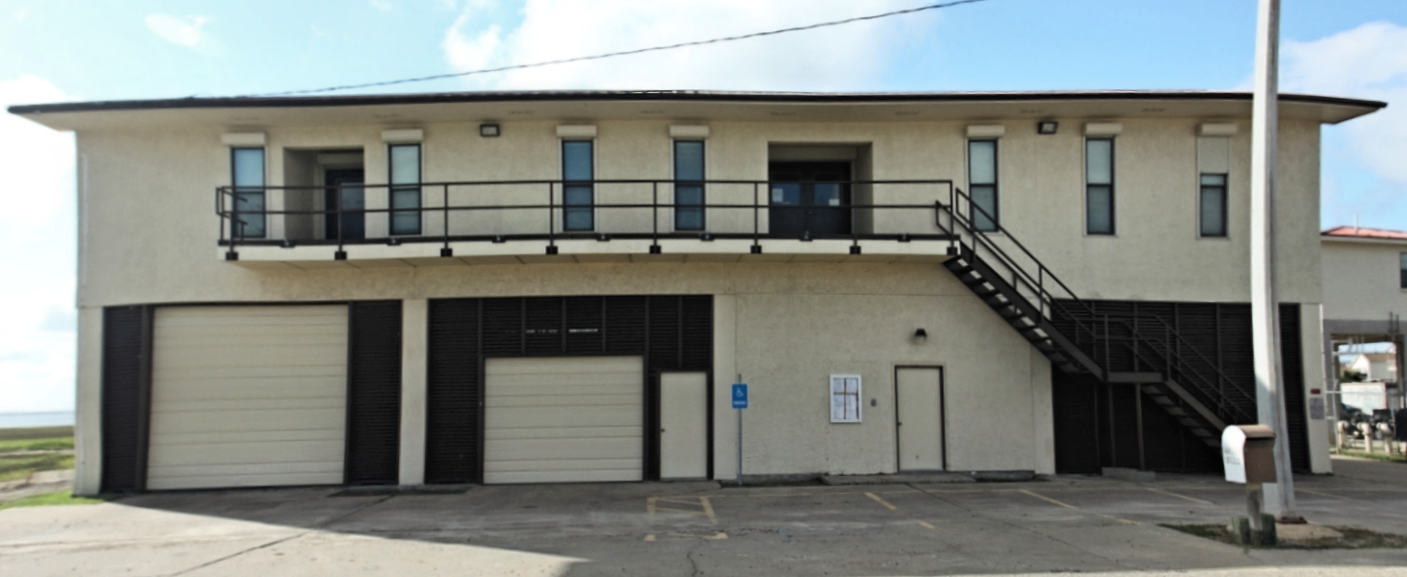
Tiki Island City Hall

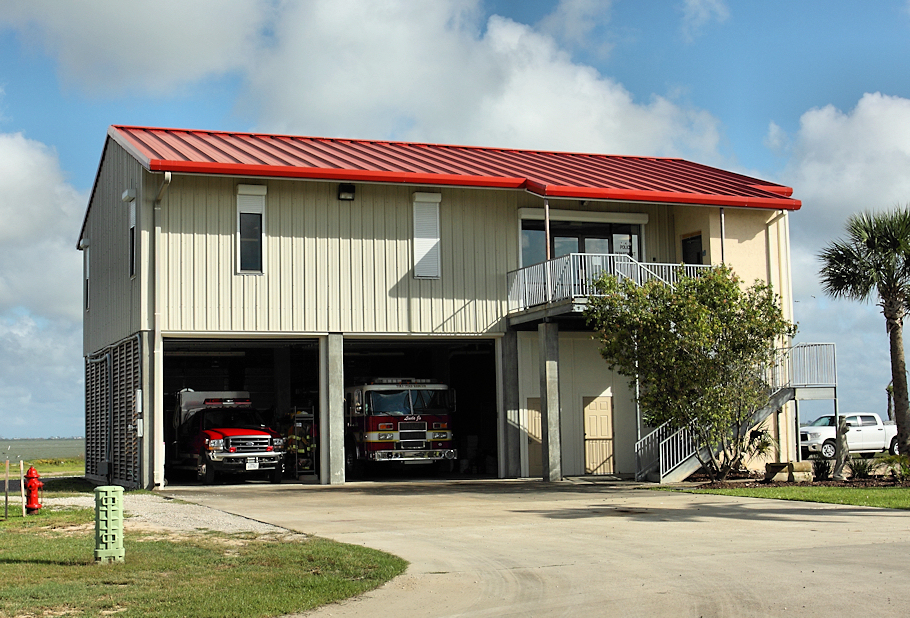
Tiki Island police station & fire department

Tiki Island is largely man-made and was built in the 1960s, when developers dug canals and used the fill to elevate the land to between four and ten feet above sea level. At first, Tiki was primarily a small fishing camp, though it evolved into a place for weekend homes, then into a village that was incorporated on August 30, 1982. Its upscale homes sit mainly on the waterfront.

Tiki Island has a full-time police department and volunteer fire department. Lacking its own post office, mail delivery is the responsibility of the nearby Galveston post office.

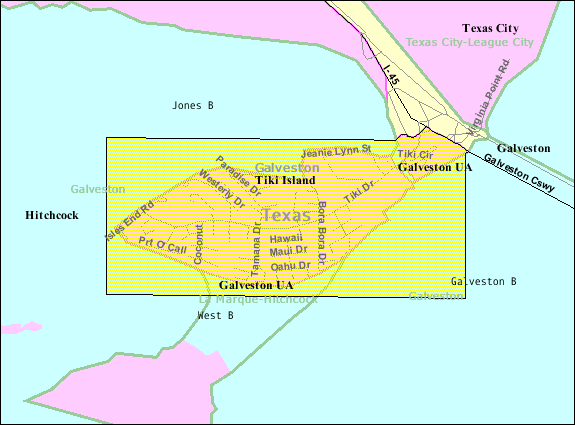
Map of Tiki Island

== Geography ==
According to the United States Census Bureau, the village has a total area of 1.6 square miles (4.1 km^{2}), of which 0.46 square miles (1.2 km^{2}) is land and 1.1 square miles (2.9 km^{2}), or 70.1%, is water.

The street names have a Polynesian theme: Bamboo, Castaway, Bora Bora, Coconut, Copra, Diamond Head, Easterly, Hawaii, Kona, Lanai, Leilani, Lotus, Majuro, Mango, Maui, Moorea, Oahu, Outrigger, Palmetto, Papeete, Paradise, Port O'Call, Tahiti, and Wahini.

== Demographics ==
Historical population
Census	Pop.	Note	%±
1990	537		—
2000	1,016		89.2%
2010	968		−4.7%
2020	1,106		14.3%
U.S. Decennial Census

=== 2020 census ===
Tiki Island racial composition (NH = Non-Hispanic) (Note: Note: the US Census treats Hispanic/Latino as an ethnic category. This table excludes Latinos from the racial categories and assigns them to a separate category. Hispanics/Latinos can be of any race.)
Race	Number	Percentage
White (NH)	965	87.25%
Black or African American (NH)	4	0.36%
Native American or Alaska Native (NH)	6	0.54%
Asian (NH)	30	2.71%
Some Other Race (NH)	1	0.09%
Mixed/Multi-Racial (NH)	29	2.62%
Hispanic or Latino	71	6.42%
Total	1,106	

As of the 2020 United States census, there were 1,106 people, 626 households, and 350 families residing in the village.

=== 2000 census ===
As of the census of 2000, there were 1,016 people, 482 households, and 349 families residing in the village. The population density was 1,567.7 inhabitants per square mile (605.3/km^{2}). There were 746 housing units at an average density of 1,151.1 per square mile (444.4/km^{2}). The racial makeup of the village was 96.26% White, 0.30% African American, 0.39% Native American, 0.98% Asian, 0.10% Pacific Islander, 0.98% from other races, and 0.98% from two or more races. Hispanic or Latino of any race were 3.64% of the population.

There were 482 households, out of which 13.7% had children under the age of 18 living with them, 68.9% were married couples living together, 1.7% had a female householder with no husband present, and 27.4% were non-families. 20.3% of all households were made up of individuals, and 3.7% had someone living alone who was 65 years of age or older. The average household size was 2.11 and the average family size was 2.40.

In the village, the population was spread out, with 10.8% under the age of 18, 3.0% from 18 to 24, 24.3% from 25 to 44, 49.5% from 45 to 64, and 12.4% who were 65 years of age or older. The median age was 50 years. For every 100 females, there were 109.5 males. For every 100 females age 18 and over, there were 107.8 males.

The median income for a household in the village was $88,891, and the median income for a family was $93,129. Males had a median income of $69,792 versus $35,333 for females. The per capita income for the village was $54,611. About 0.8% of families and 2.0% of the population were below the poverty line, including 4.7% of those under age 18 and none of those age 65 or over.

== Government and infrastructure ==
As per a governmental agreement, Tiki Island receives animal services from the Galveston County Animal Resource Center, an animal shelter operated by the Galveston County Health District in Texas City.

Galveston Area Ambulance Authority (GAAA), also operated by the health district, provides EMS services to this municipality.

== Education ==
The eastern half of Tiki Island is zoned to the Texas City Independent School District (TCISD). The western half is zoned to the Hitchcock Independent School District (HISD).

On December 2, 2015, Texas Education Agency (TEA) Commissioner Michael Williams announced that TCISD would absorb La Marque Independent School District (LMISD), effective July 1, 2016. LMISD previously served the eastern half of Tiki Island. La Marque High School is the area's designated high school as the former LMISD area retained its school zones. Tiki Island is zoned to La Marque elementary and middle schools: La Marque Primary School, Hayley Elementary, and La Marque Middle School.

The former La Marque District (and the Texas City district) as well as the Hitchcock district (and therefore all of Tiki Island) are served by the College of the Mainland.
