= Michael Sam =

American football coach and former player (born 1990)

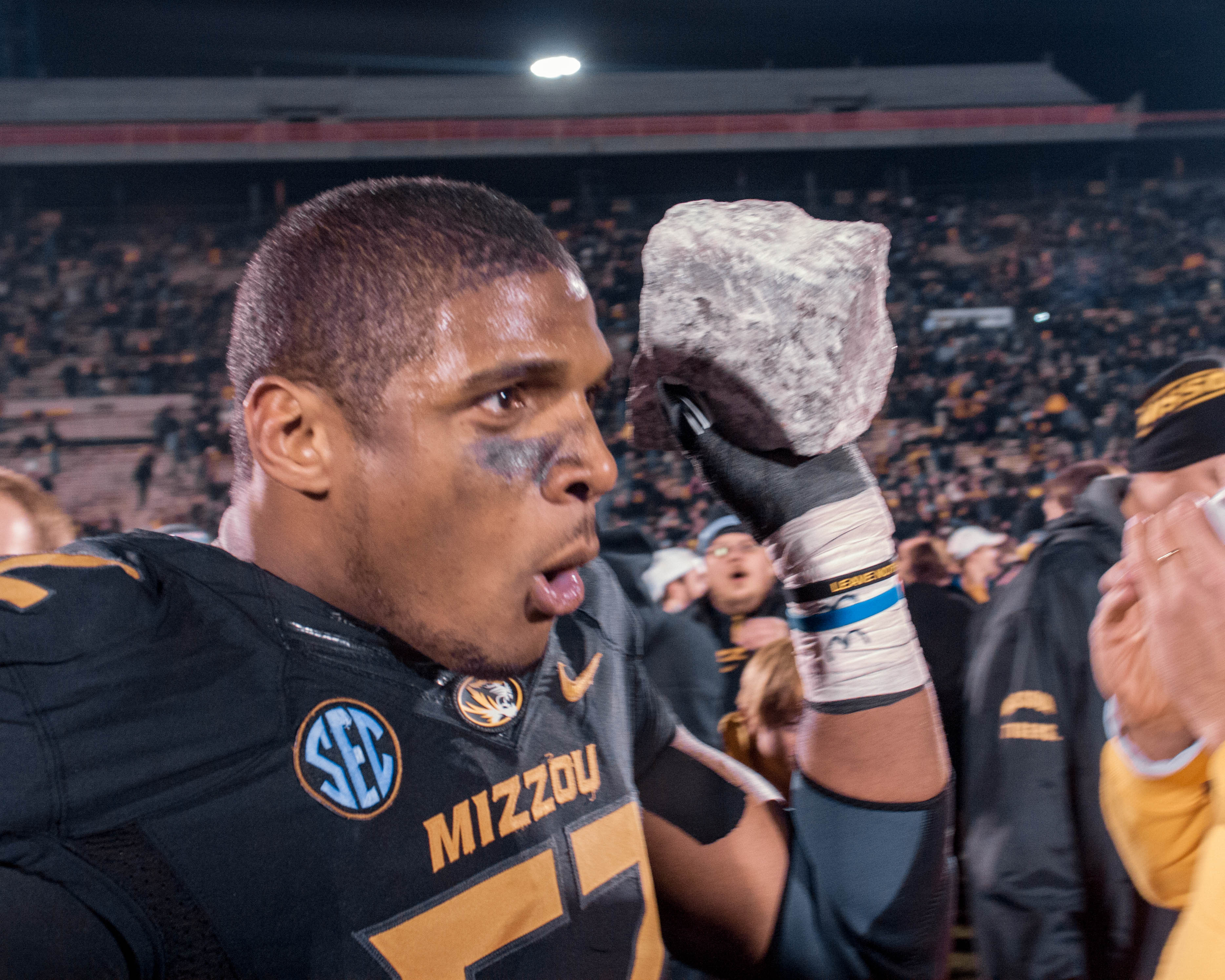
- Sam holding a souvenir rock from the rock 'M' at Memorial Stadium after a win against Texas A&M

Berlin Thunder
- Title: Linebacker coach

Personal information
- Born: January 7, 1990 (age 36); Galveston, Texas, U.S.
- Listed height: 6 ft 2 in (1.88 m)
- Listed weight: 261 lb (118 kg)

Career information
- High school: Hitchcock (Hitchcock, Texas)
- College: Missouri (2009–2013)
- NFL draft: 2014: 7th round, 249th overall pick

Career history

Playing
- St. Louis Rams (2014)*; Dallas Cowboys (2014)*; Montreal Alouettes (2015); Barcelona Dragons (2022)
- * Offseason or practice squad member only

Coaching
- Barcelona Dragons (2022–2024) Assistant defensive line coach; Panthers Wrocław (2024) Defensive line coach; Servals de Clermont-Ferrand (2025) Defensive coordinator; Berlin Thunder (2026–present) Linebacker coach

Awards and highlights
- Second-team All-ELF (2022); Unanimous All-American (2013); SEC Defensive Player of the Year (2013); First-team All-SEC (2013); Arthur Ashe Courage Award (2014)
- Stats at Pro Football Reference
- Stats at CFL.ca (archive)

Michael Alan Sam Jr. (born January 7, 1990) is an American former professional football defensive lineman who is a coach for the Berlin Thunder in the American Football League Europe. Sam played college football for the Missouri Tigers and was selected by the St. Louis Rams of the National Football League (NFL) in the seventh round of the 2014 NFL draft. He played one game for the Montreal Alouettes in the Canadian Football League (CFL).

Sam was a unanimous All-American and the Southeastern Conference (SEC) Defensive Player of the Year as a senior at Missouri. After completing his college football career, Sam publicly came out as gay. He became the first publicly gay player to be drafted in the NFL. The Rams released him during the final preseason roster cuts. He also spent time on the Dallas Cowboys' practice squad before being waived. He signed with Montreal before the 2015 season, and became the first publicly gay player to play in a CFL regular-season game.

== Early life ==
Sam attended Hitchcock High School in Hitchcock, Texas. He began traveling with the school's varsity football team while in the eighth grade as a water boy. He later became a member of the team, playing defensive end and offensive tackle.

He earned first-team All-District honors as a defensive lineman in all four years of high school, and as an offensive lineman in his junior and senior years. As a senior, Sam drew attention for his strong performance against Michael Brockers in a game against Chávez High School; Brockers, an All-American, had accepted a scholarship to Louisiana State University.

Out of high school, Sam was considered a two-star college football recruit by Rivals.com. He received scholarship offers from Arizona State University, Colorado State University, and the University of Houston, but he wanted to attend Texas A&M University, and waited for a scholarship offer from it.

== College career ==
Sam accepted a scholarship offer from the University of Missouri (Mizzou), after he was recruited by Craig Kuligowski, the team's defensive line coach. Kuligowski recruited other players near Hitchcock, which made him familiar with Sam. Sam attended the school from 2009 to 2013. He played for the Tigers, competing in the Big 12 Conference. He redshirted in his first year at Missouri, and recorded 3.5 quarterback sacks, 24 tackles, including seven tackles for loss, two forced fumbles, one interception and one blocked kick as a redshirt freshman. In his sophomore year, Sam intercepted a tipped pass in a game against the Texas Tech Red Raiders, which secured a victory to make Mizzou bowl eligible. In 2012, Mizzou transferred to the Southeastern Conference (SEC). Sam registered 3 1/2 sacks while starting in nine of the team's games.

As a senior in 2013, Sam recorded 11.5 quarterback sacks and 19 tackles for a loss. He led the SEC in both categories, and tied Missouri's single-season record for sacks. He was named the SEC Defensive Player of the Week in two consecutive weeks, after recording three sacks apiece in games against the Arkansas State Red Wolves and the Vanderbilt Commodores. After the season, Sam was named the SEC Co-Defensive Player of the Year, with C. J. Mosley of the University of Alabama, and a first-team All-SEC selection.

Sam was named a first-team All-American by the Walter Camp Football Foundation, Associated Press, Sporting News, the American Football Coaches Association, and the Football Writers Association of America. He was also named a semifinalist for the Chuck Bednarik Award, the Hendricks Award, and the Lombardi Award. Missouri played in the 2014 Cotton Bowl Classic, in which Sam forced a fumble which was returned for a touchdown, securing Missouri's victory over the Oklahoma State Cowboys.

During his college career, Sam accumulated 123 tackles, including 36 for loss, 21 sacks, six forced fumbles and two intercepted passes. He graduated from Missouri in December 2013. He participated in the 2014 Senior Bowl in January 2014; considered too small to play as a defensive end in the National Football League (NFL), he played as an outside linebacker. Sam struggled at the new position.

== Professional career ==
=== Pre-draft ===
Early projections had Sam as a third- or fourth-round pick in the 2014 NFL draft. His performance in the NFL Scouting Combine in February 2014 was seen as disappointing, which lowered expectations about whether he would be taken in the draft. He was considered to be too small to play defensive end and too slow to play outside linebacker. He showed improvement at a public workout a month later, but his pre-draft rankings ranged from 12th to 25th among defensive ends. At the 2013 draft, 33 defensive ends were selected overall, with 23 taken in the final four rounds.

Pre-draft measurables
Height	Weight	Arm length	Hand span	40-yard dash	10-yard split	20-yard split	20-yard shuttle	Three-cone drill	Vertical jump	Broad jump	Bench press
6 ft 2 in (1.88 m)	261 lb (118 kg)	33 3/8 in (0.85 m)	9 3/8 in (0.24 m)	4.91 s	1.74 s	2.85 s	4.70 s	7.80 s	25.5 in (0.65 m)	9 ft 6 in (2.90 m)	19 reps
All values from NFL Combine/Pro Day

=== St. Louis Rams ===
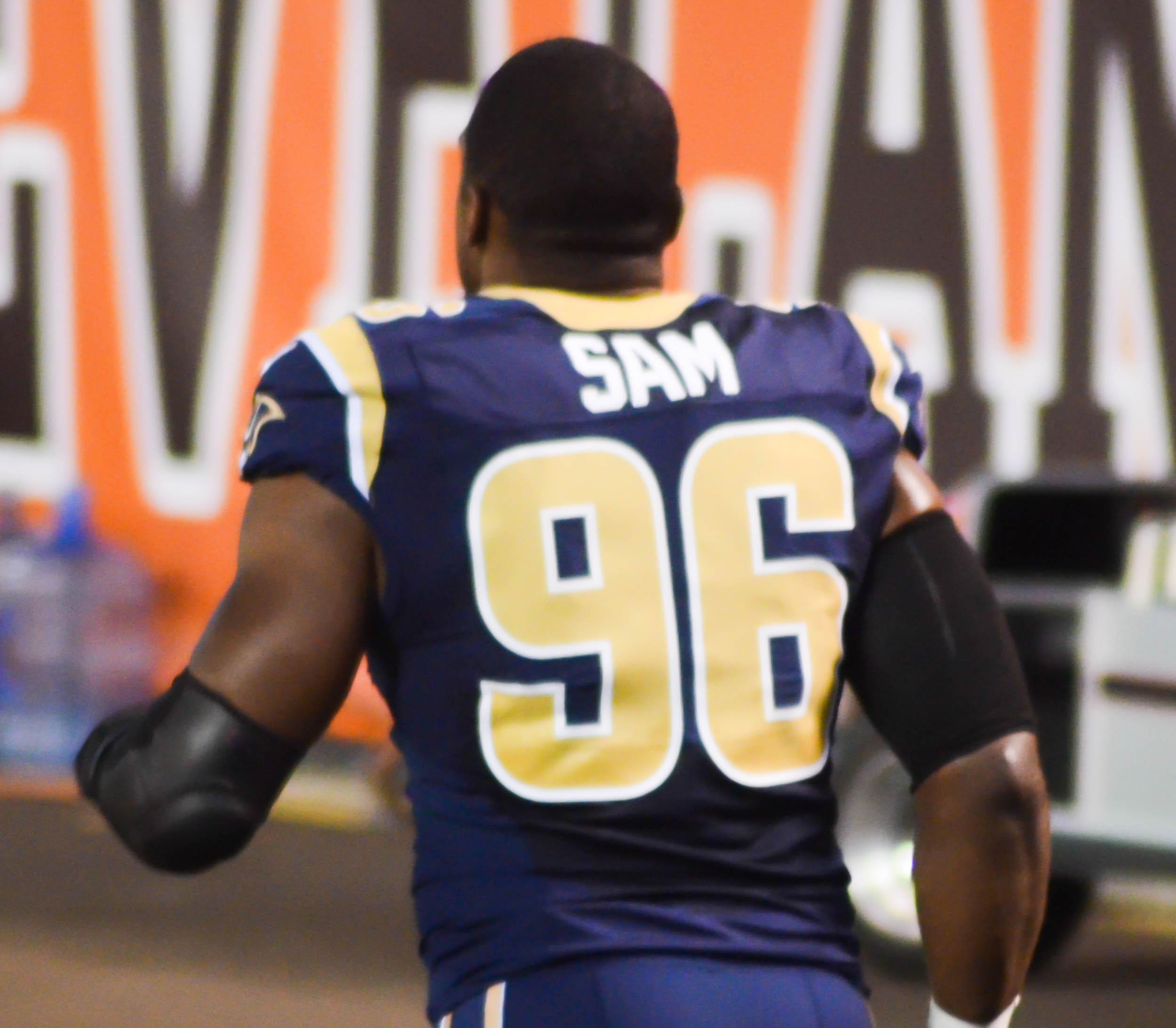
Sam with the St. Louis Rams during the 2014 preseason

The St. Louis Rams drafted Sam in the seventh round, the 249th of 256 players selected in the 2014 draft. He became the first publicly gay player to be drafted into the NFL. In a statement, President Barack Obama said that he "congratulates Michael Sam, the Rams and the NFL for taking an important step forward today in our Nation's journey" and that "[f]rom the playing field to the corporate boardroom, LGBT Americans prove every day that you should be judged by what you do and not who you are." St. Louis Rams jerseys bearing his name became the second best selling rookie jerseys at the NFL's website behind Cleveland Browns' quarterback (and Heisman Trophy winner) Johnny Manziel. During the period from April 1 through July 17, Sam's jersey ranked sixth in sales among all NFL players.

Sam made his professional debut on August 8, 2014, during the first preseason game against the New Orleans Saints, where he made one tackle in the game on quarterback Ryan Griffin. During the second preseason game against the Green Bay Packers, Sam recorded his first professional sack where he sacked Matt Flynn. In preseason game 3 against the Cleveland Browns, Sam sacked Manziel. In four exhibition games, Sam recorded 11 tackles and 3 sacks, including a team-leading 6 tackles in the final game. "I believe he can play in this league", Rams coach Jeff Fisher said, two days before cutting him from the roster. On August 30, St. Louis released Sam as part of a final round of cuts to reduce their roster to the league-mandated 53 players before the start of the regular season. The Rams, who kept nine defensive linemen, chose to retain undrafted rookie Ethan Westbrooks over Sam. While their statistics were similar, Westbrooks provided the versatility to play all four defensive line positions, while Sam had been playing virtually exclusively as a left defensive end. Of the 41 picks in the seventh round in the 2014 draft, only 22 made initial 53-man rosters. Opting to add depth at other positions, St. Louis did not add Sam to their practice squad after he cleared waivers. Many people believe that the decision to cut Sam from the NFL was due to the underlying issue of homophobia within American football.

=== Dallas Cowboys ===
On September 3, 2014, Sam was added to the practice squad of the Dallas Cowboys. On October 21, the Cowboys waived Sam to make room for linebacker Troy Davis.

=== 2015 NFL Veteran Combine ===
Sam participated in the first NFL Veteran Combine, running 4.99 seconds in the 40-yard dash.

=== Montreal Alouettes ===
On May 22, 2015, Sam signed a two-year contract with Montreal Alouettes of the CFL, which made him the first openly gay player in the league's history.

On June 12, a day before the Alouettes' first preseason game, Sam was granted permission to leave camp for "personal reasons" to return home to Texas, and was placed on the suspended list. The specific reason for his departure has never been publicized. On June 26, the team announced Sam had returned to Montreal and would resume practicing with the team on June 30. After sitting out the team's first five games, he made his CFL debut on August 7, 2015, against the Ottawa Redblacks, and became the first publicly gay player to play in a CFL regular season game. He did not record a tackle in the game. Sam missed the next game after the team reported he had a sore back. He left the team the following day, citing concerns with his mental health after a 12-month stretch which he described as "difficult". Montreal again placed him on their suspended list. After leaving Montreal, Sam told radio host Dan Patrick on his show he never wanted to play in the CFL to begin with. "It was a really last call to go to the CFL. I never really wanted to go to the CFL, but I did and I committed to going".

=== Hiatus ===
On August 14, 2015, Sam announced, on Twitter, he was stepping away from professional football due to mental health reasons. He was out of football for seven years. In that time, he shared his experiences as an author and motivational speaker.

== Coaching career ==
=== Barcelona Dragons ===
On April 10, 2022, it was announced that Sam had been hired as the assistant defensive line coach for the Barcelona Dragons of the European League of Football.

On June 1, the team announced that Sam had been signed as a player after a roster spot opened up. He started as a defensive lineman in the team's first game on June 5.

=== Panthers Wrocław ===
On February 25, 2024, it was announced that Sam had been hired as the assistant defensive line coach for the Panthers Wrocław of the European League of Football.

=== Servals ===
In 2025, Sam was hired as defensive coordinator and defensive line coach for the Servals in Clermont-Ferrand, France.

=== Berlin Thunder ===
On February 26, 2026, the Berlin Thunder announced that Sam had joined the team as the linebackers coach.

== Personal life ==
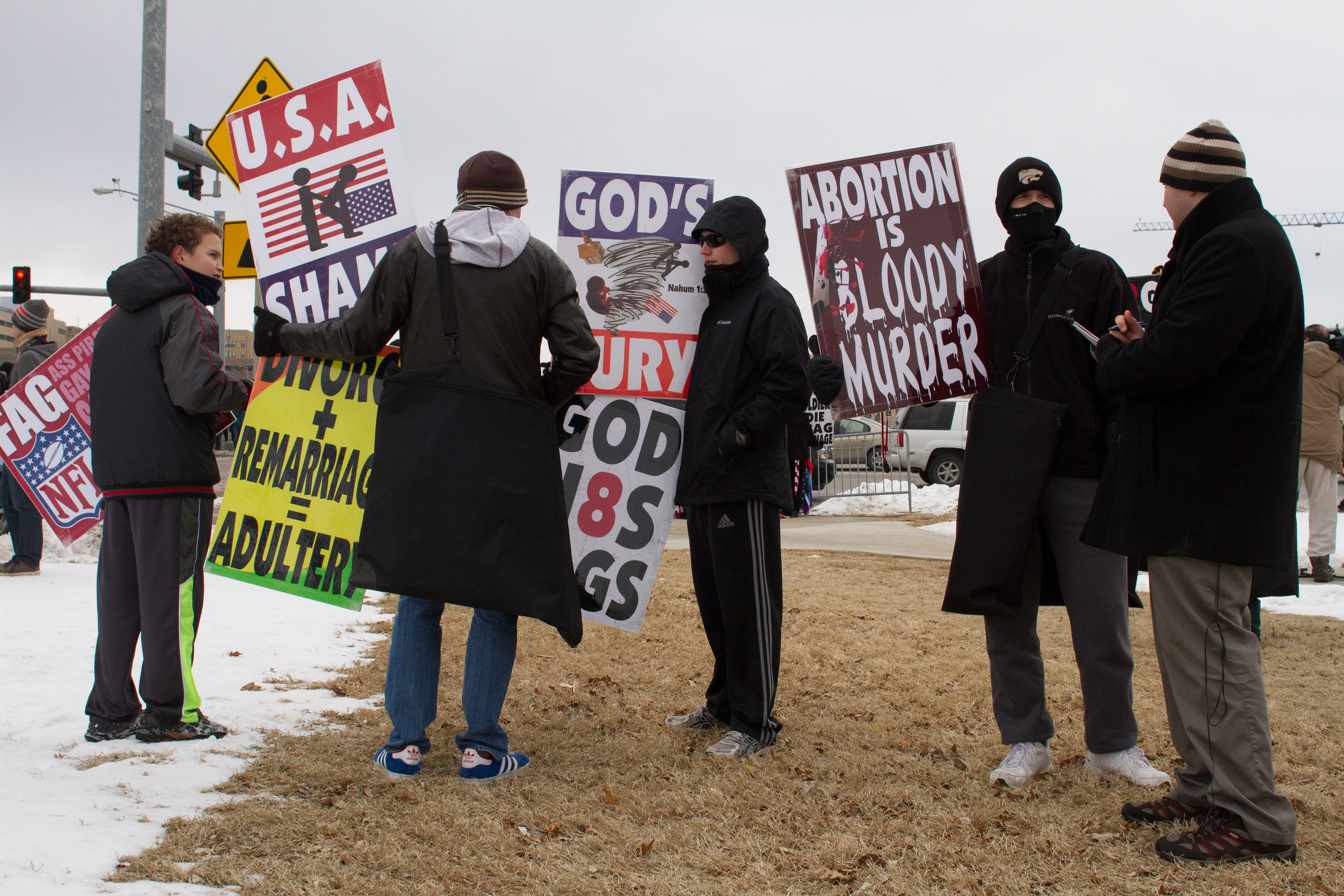
Members of the Westboro Baptist Church protest Sam and the University of Missouri.

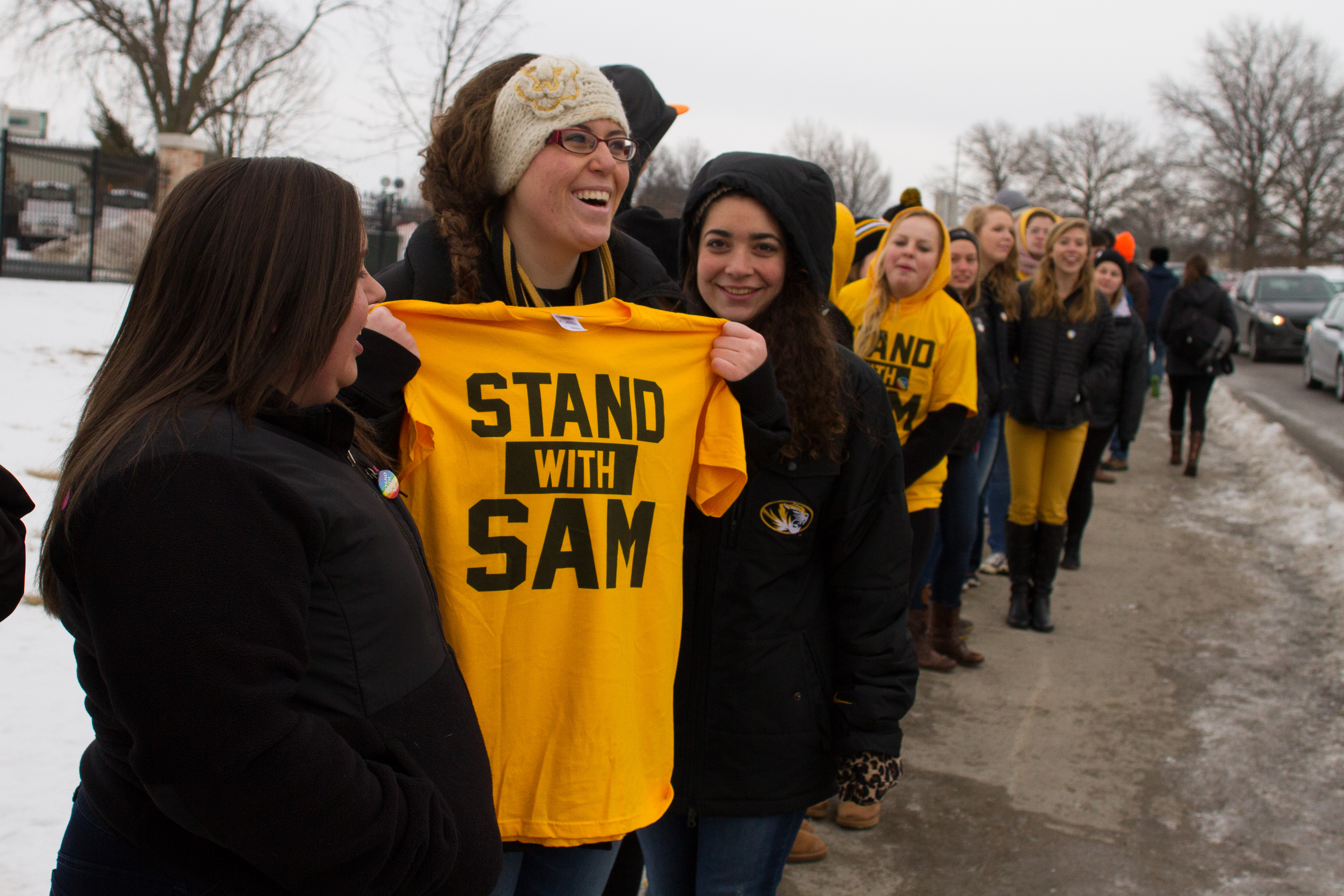
Student counter-protesters form a wall in support of Sam.

Sam is the seventh of eight children born to JoAnn and Michael Alan Sam Sr. His parents separated when he was young. As a child, Sam watched one of his older brothers die from a gunshot wound. Another older brother has been missing since 1998, and his other two brothers are in prison. A sister who was born before him died in infancy. At one point in his childhood, Sam lived in his mother's car. He was once accidentally maced by police who were arresting one of his brothers.

Sam argued with his mother, a Jehovah's Witness, over playing football, as she did not agree with those pursuits. Sam often stayed with friends while in high school; the parents of a classmate gave him a bedroom in their house and had him complete household chores. Sam is the first member of his family to attend college.

In August 2013, Sam took the opportunity of a team introduce-yourself session to inform his Missouri teammates that he was gay, and found them supportive. He avoided talking to the media to avoid addressing rumors of his sexuality. He came out to his father a week before coming out publicly. The New York Times wrote that his father, a self-described "old-school ... man-and-a-woman type of guy", said "I don't want my grandkids raised in that kind of environment." His father told the Galveston Daily News that he was "terribly misquoted", though The New York Times maintained that he was quoted "accurately and fairly."

On February 9, 2014, in an interview with Chris Connelly on ESPN's Outside the Lines, Sam responded to questions about his coming-out experience and his status as one of college football's first openly self-acknowledged gay players. At the time, no active NFL player had ever come out publicly. Anonymous NFL executives told Sports Illustrated they expected Sam to fall in the draft as a result of his announcement. Those statements caused National Football League Players Association executive director DeMaurice Smith to respond that any team official who anonymously downgrades Sam is "gutless". From jail, his brother Josh said, "I'm proud of him for not becoming like me. I still love him, whatever his lifestyle is. He's still my brother and I love him."

The week after his ESPN interview, Sam returned to Missouri with the Tigers football team to accept the 2014 Cotton Bowl championship trophy at a ceremony held at the halftime of a Missouri Tigers basketball game at Mizzou Arena. Anti-gay activist Shirley Phelps-Roper and about 15 other members of the Westboro Baptist Church, an organization widely considered a hate group, protested his appearance. Students organized a counter-protest numbering in the thousands, (Note: Missouri University police estimated around 500, others reported a thousand or more, while ESPN.com estimated around 2,000.) assembling a "human wall" in front of the protesters.

After being drafted by the Rams, Sam's emotional reaction to his draft was broadcast live on television, during which he kissed his boyfriend, Vito Cammisano. Reported to have been dating Sam for several months, Cammisano is a fellow alum of the University of Missouri and was a member of the school's swim team. In January 2015, Sam and Cammisano announced their engagement. However, the couple ended their relationship in June 2015, although they have remained friends.

In April 2016 Sam spoke with LGBTQ advocacy groups at the Missouri State Capitol against a bill and personally lobbied state legislators.

=== Dancing with the Stars ===
On February 24, 2015, Sam was announced as one of the celebrities to compete on the 20th season of Dancing with the Stars. He partnered with professional dancer Peta Murgatroyd. They were eliminated in the fourth week of competition and finished in tenth place.

== Honors and accolades ==
Sam won the Arthur Ashe Courage Award at the 2014 ESPY Awards. He was named one of GQ's Men of the Year, and a finalist for Sports Illustrated's Sportsman of the Year.

== See also ==
- Homosexuality in American football
- List of LGBT sportspeople
