= Hitchcock, Texas =

City of Hitchcock, Texas
- City
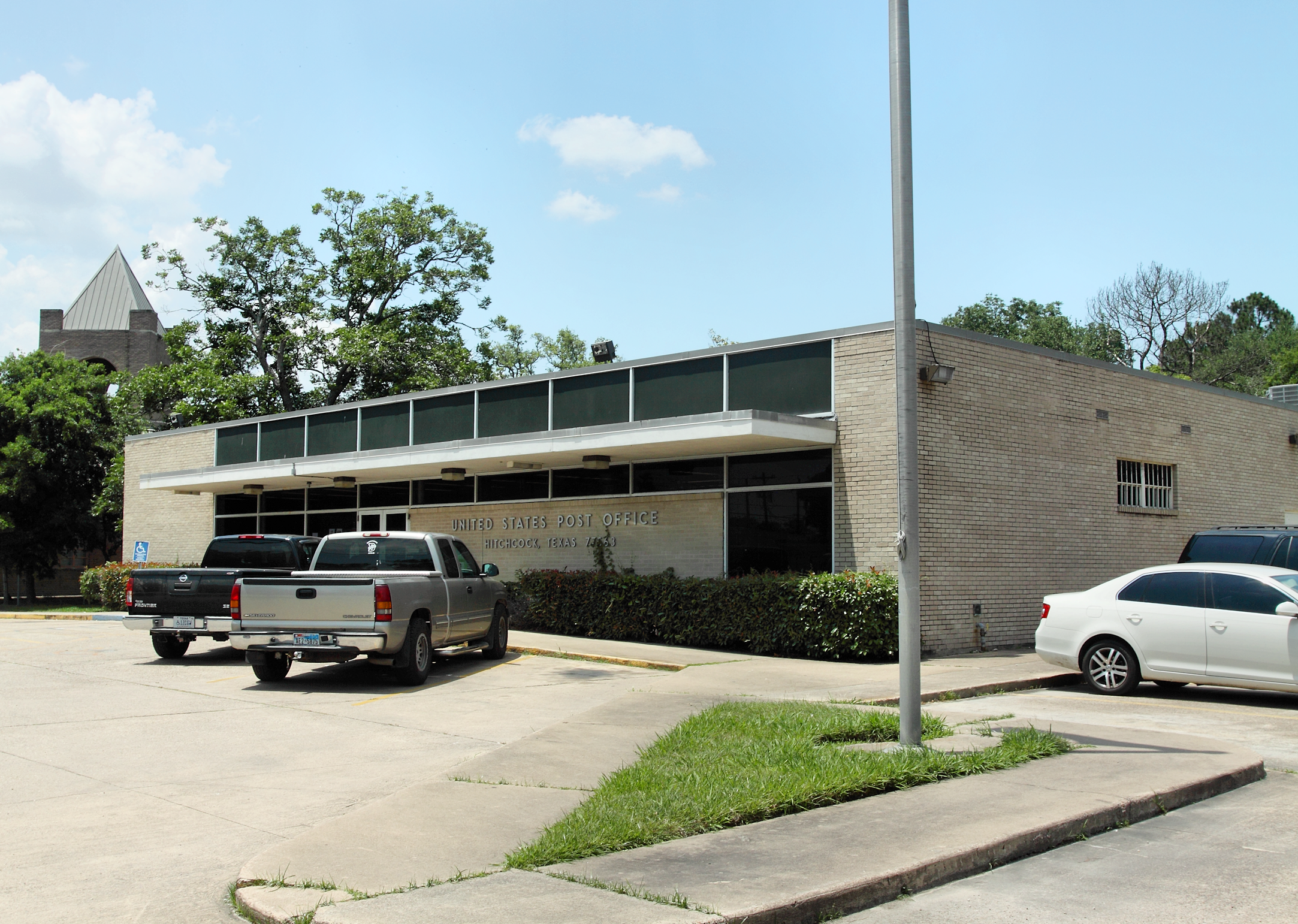
- Hitchcock Post Office

- Location in the state of Texas
- Coordinates: 29°20′54″N 95°0′58″W
- Country: United States
- State: Texas
- County: Galveston
- Incorporated: January 30, 1960

Government
  - Mayor: Chris Armacost

Area
  - Total: 91.48 sq mi (236.94 km^{2})
  - Land: 60.43 sq mi (156.51 km^{2})
  - Water: 31.05 sq mi (80.43 km^{2})
- Elevation: 16 ft (4.9 m)

Population (2020)
  - Total: 7,301
  - Density: 120.8/sq mi (46.65/km^{2})
- Time zone: UTC-6 (CST)
  - Summer (DST): UTC-5 (CDT)
- ZIP code: 77563
- Area code: 409
- FIPS code: 48-34220
- GNIS feature ID: 1359310
- Website: http://www.cityofhitchcock.org/

Hitchcock is a city in Galveston County, Texas, United States and a suburb of Galveston. The population was 7,301 at the 2020 census.

== History ==
Hitchcock was created as a station of the railroad between Galveston and Houston in 1873 and around the turn of the 20th century, it became a vegetable shipping center. The settlement's economy crashed in the 1930s after insect plagues in the surrounding areas, and the area stayed impoverished until the establishment of Camp Wallace, an anti-aircraft training base, and the Naval Air Station Hitchcock at the beginning of World War II. After the end of the war, the bases were used as discharge centers, and some former soldiers settled in the area. Hitchcock was established in 1960 as the area's population boomed, topping out at nearly 7,000 by the end of the 1960s.

Since 1984, Hitchcock has been home to the Galveston County Fair & Rodeo. The Galveston County Fair & Rodeo began in 1938 and was held at facilities in Runge Park in Arcadia. In the early 1980s, the County Fair had reached its limits of growth at Runge Park, and plans began for a move to Jack Brooks Park in Hitchcock. The move to Jack Brooks Park was completed in time for the 1984 fair.

Hitchcock was affected by Hurricane Harvey in 2017. The director of community development, D. Joe Wood, stated that bankruptcy was a possibility in the post-Hurricane environment.

== Geography ==
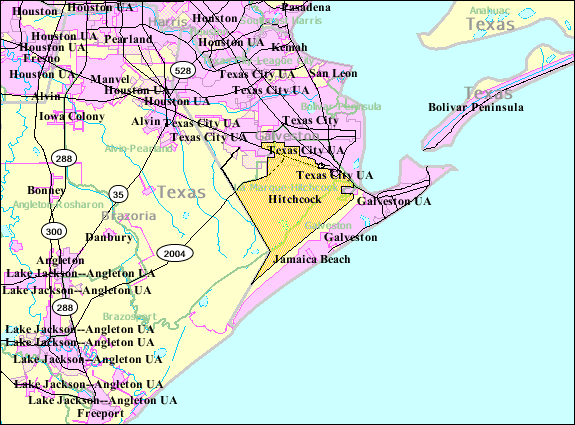
Map of Hitchcock

Hitchcock is located at 29°20′54″N 95°0′58″W.

According to the United States Census Bureau, the city has a total area of 92.1 square miles (238.5 km^{2}), of which 60.5 square miles (156.6 km^{2}) is land and 31.6 square miles (81.9 km^{2}), or 34.35%, is water.

== Demographics ==
Historical population
| Census | Pop. | Note | %± |
|---|---|---|---|
| 1960 | 5,216 | | — |
| 1970 | 5,565 | | 6.7% |
| 1980 | 6,103 | | 9.7% |
| 1990 | 5,868 | | −3.9% |
| 2000 | 6,386 | | 8.8% |
| 2010 | 6,961 | | 9.0% |
| 2020 | 7,301 | | 4.9% |
U.S. Decennial Census

=== 2020 census ===
As of the 2020 census, Hitchcock had a population of 7,301. The median age was 38.1 years. 24.5% of residents were under the age of 18 and 16.1% of residents were 65 years of age or older. For every 100 females there were 91.4 males, and for every 100 females age 18 and over there were 88.8 males age 18 and over.

86.4% of residents lived in urban areas, while 13.6% lived in rural areas.

There were 2,777 households in Hitchcock, of which 33.9% had children under the age of 18 living in them. Of all households, 41.4% were married-couple households, 19.4% were households with a male householder and no spouse or partner present, and 32.2% were households with a female householder and no spouse or partner present. About 27.3% of all households were made up of individuals and 11.8% had someone living alone who was 65 years of age or older.

There were 3,263 housing units, of which 14.9% were vacant. The homeowner vacancy rate was 2.0% and the rental vacancy rate was 17.4%.

Racial composition as of the 2020 census
| Race | Number | Percent |
|---|---|---|
| White | 3,760 | 51.5% |
| Black or African American | 1,837 | 25.2% |
| American Indian and Alaska Native | 72 | 1.0% |
| Asian | 50 | 0.7% |
| Native Hawaiian and Other Pacific Islander | 6 | 0.1% |
| Some other race | 622 | 8.5% |
| Two or more races | 954 | 13.1% |
| Hispanic or Latino (of any race) | 1,826 | 25.0% |

=== 2000 census ===
As of the census of 2000, there were 6,386 people, 2,434 households, and 1,737 families residing in the city. The population density was 96.1 inhabitants per square mile (37.1/km^{2}). There were 2,754 housing units at an average density of 41.4 per square mile (16.0/km^{2}). The racial makeup of the city was 59.96% White, 32.81% African American, 0.28% Native American, 0.16% Asian, 0.03% Pacific Islander, 4.76% from other races, and 2.00% from two or more races. Hispanic or Latino of any race were 13.73% of the population.

There were 2,434 households, out of which 32.1% had children under the age of 18 living with them, 48.7% were married couples living together, 17.3% had a female householder with no husband present, and 28.6% were non-families. 25.6% of all households were made up of individuals, and 10.8% had someone living alone who was 65 years of age or older. The average household size was 2.62 and the average family size was 3.14.

In the city, the population was spread out, with 27.7% under the age of 18, 8.4% from 18 to 24, 27.2% from 25 to 44, 22.2% from 45 to 64, and 14.4% who were 65 years of age or older. The median age was 36 years. For every 100 females, there were 92.2 males. For every 100 females age 18 and over, there were 87.3 males.

The median income for a household in the city was $29,848, and the median income for a family was $35,013. Males had a median income of $31,098 versus $22,340 for females. The per capita income for the city was $14,964. About 16.3% of families and 19.0% of the population were below the poverty line, including 27.3% of those under age 18 and 15.8% of those age 65 or over.

== Government and infrastructure ==
The Hitchcock Post Office is located at 8120 Texas State Highway 6.

As per a governmental agreement, Hitchcock receives animal services from the Galveston County Animal Resource Center, an animal shelter operated by the Galveston County Health District in Texas City.

Galveston Area Ambulance Authority (GAAA), also operated by the health district, provides EMS services to this municipality.

== Education ==
=== Public schools ===
Most of Hitchcock is served by the Hitchcock Independent School District, which operates the public schools in the area.

Certain portions of the city fall within the boundaries of the Santa Fe Independent School District.

=== Private schools ===
Our Lady of Lourdes School, a Roman Catholic elementary school operated by the Roman Catholic Archdiocese of Galveston–Houston, is located in Hitchcock.

=== Colleges and universities ===
The Hitchcock and Santa Fe districts (and therefore all of Hitchcock) are served by the College of the Mainland.

=== Public libraries ===
The Genevieve Miller Hitchcock Public Library was established in 2015.

== Parks and recreation ==
Each year Juneteenth is celebrated in the Stringfellow Orchards, a 9.5-acre (3.8 ha) complex previously owned by a slave owner. The Texas Historical Commission erected a historical marker in 1992. In 2004, the site had not been previously maintained, but Samuel Collins III discovered it in 2004 and, with his wife Doris, later purchased it. As of 2007 the Collins' remain the owners.

== Notable people ==
- Taurian Fontenette (born 1983), streetball player whose nicknames include "The Air Up There" and "Mr. 720"
- Randy Hymes, former NFL player who played for Baltimore Ravens, Jacksonville Jaguars, and Minnesota Vikings
- David M. Medina, former Texas Supreme Court Justice and General Counsel to Governor Rick Perry
- Michael Sam, the first publicly gay player to be drafted in the NFL
