= Houston Gay Pride Parade =

Annual LGBT event in Houston, Texas, US

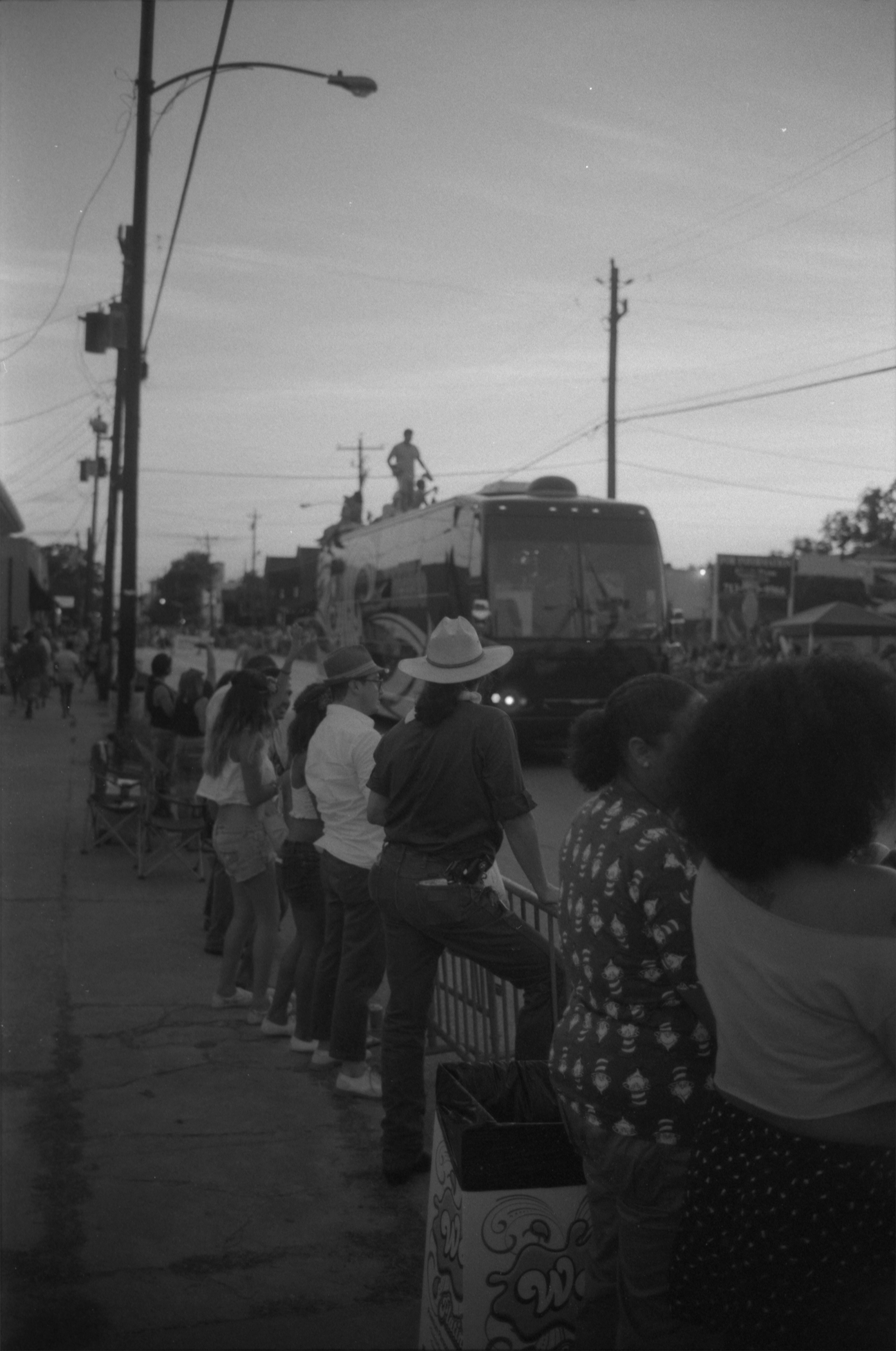
- Houston Gay Pride Parade, 2013
- Status: Active
- Genre: Pride parade
- Frequency: Annually in June
- Location: Houston, Texas
- Inaugurated: 1979
- Attendance: 700,000 (2015)

The Houston Gay Pride Parade (often called the Houston Pride Parade) is the major feature of a gay pride festival held annually since 1978. The festival takes place in June to celebrate lesbian, gay, bisexual, and transgender people and their allies. This event commemorates the 1969 police raid of the Stonewall Inn on Christopher Street in New York City's Greenwich Village neighborhood, which is generally considered to be the beginning of the modern gay rights movement. Protests against police harassment in Houston also helped bring about the parade.

The festivities are held all day on the 4th Saturday of June. The highlight of the event is the parade, which has been held in the evening after sunset since 1997. The necessary revision in a Houston parade ordinance to allow a nighttime parade was facilitated by then-Houston City Council member Annise Parker. With the event after dark, the various units can be creatively illuminated.

Until 2015, it took place in Houston's most gay-friendly neighborhood, Montrose. The route of the parade usually had been along Westheimer Road, from Dunlavy Street to Crocker Street. Owing partially to concerns over increasing congestion over the years in the nearby neighborhoods, and to accommodate a larger festival (held in the daytime before the parade itself), the 2015 parade was moved to downtown Houston.

It is currently the most attended and largest gay pride event in Texas, the Southwest region of the United States, and the second largest Houston-organized event in the city behind Houston Rodeo. The 2015 Houston Pride Festival attracted 700,000 attendees, which set a new record. The Houston Pride parade was expected to take place in the fall for the first time in 2020 due to the COVID-19 pandemic; however, due to the increasing cases in Houston the 2020 Pride Parade was replaced with a virtual rally. It was the first and only time the parade was cancelled.

== Awards ==
Entries in the parade are eligible for awards in categories with cultural references significant to LGBT history as well as a judges pick and categories with more localized focus:

- Judges' Choice
- Aria (best creative sound)
- Fabulous (best costumes)
- Rainbow (best lighting)
- Ruby Slipper (best walking)
- Judy Garland (best performance)
- Pink Diamond (best float by a for-profit company)
- Priscilla (best float by a non-profit group)
- Spirit of Montrose (best overall)

== Houston Pride Themes and Parade Grand Marshals ==
| Year | Theme | Grand Marshal(s) | Honorary Grand Marshal(s) | Organizational Grand Marshal(s) | Community Grand Marshal(s) | Celebrity Grand Marshal(s) |
|---|---|---|---|---|---|---|
| 1979 | "United We Stand" | Thelma Hansel | | | | |
| 1980 | "Proud to Be" | Jim Farmer and Ruth Ravas | | | | |
| 1981 | "We the People" | Ray Hill and Rita Wanstrom | | | | |
| 1982 | "A Part Of, Not Apart From" | Marion Coleman and Andy Mills | | | | |
| 1983 | "Unity through Diversity" | Marion Pantzer and Walter Strickler | | | | |
| 1984 | "Unity and More in '84" | Pokey Anderson and Rick Grossman | | | | |
| 1985 | "Alive with Pride" | Terry Clark and Freda Jerrell | | | | |
| 1986 | "Liberty Is In Our Grasp" | Tony Bicocchi and Dee Lamb | | | | |
| 1987 | "Come Out and Celebrate Pride" | Persons Living With AIDS | | | | |
| 1988 | "Rightfully Proud" | Bruce Cook and Eleanor Munger | Sharon Kowalski and Harvey Milk | | | |
| 1989 | "Stonewall 20" | Charles Armstrong and Bettie Naylor | | | | |
| 1990 | "Look to the Future" | Walter Carter and Annise Parker | Debra Danburg and Craig Washington | | | |
| 1991 | "Take Pride" | Gene Harrington, Jack Jackson and Linda Morales | Katy Caldwell and Marvin Davis | | | |
| 1992 | "Pride = Power" | Sheri Cohen Darbonne and Brian Keever | | Gay & Lesbian Switchboard Houston | | |
| 1993 | "Out & Proud" | Brian Bradley and Carolyn Mobley | Adan Rios | PFLAG Houston | | |
| 1994 | "HouStoneWall 25" | Jay Allen and Cicely Wynne | Claire Koepsel | Q-Patrol | | |
| 1995 | "Silence to Celebration" | Suzanne Anderson and Don Gill | Annella Harrison | H.A.T.C.H. | | |
| 1996 | "Pride Knows No Borders" | Bill Havard and Jeanette Vaughn | Jack Abercia | The Royal, Sovereign, and Imperial Court of the Single Star | | |
| 1997 | "Glowing with Pride" | Deborah Bell and Jimmy Carper | | Krewe of Olympus | | |
| 1998 | "Unified, Diversified, Electrified" | Bob Bouton and Jackie Doval | Barbara Winston | Texas Gay Rodeo Association | | |
| 1999 | "Pride, Power & Pizzazz" | Sean Carter and Nancy Ford | | Colt 45's | | |
| 2000 | "Take Pride, Take Joy, Take Action" | Richard Weiderholt and Tori Williams | Don Sinclair | People With AIDS Coalition Houston | | |
| 2001 | "Embrace Diversity" | Mitchell Katine and Dalia Stokes | Blake and Gordon Weisser | PFLAG Houston | | |
| 2002 | "Pride Worldwide" | Mela Contreras and Rusty Mueller | Jane and Irv Smith | Gay & Lesbian Switchboard Houston | | |
| 2003 | "Silver Celebration" | All former Grand Marshals honored | | | | |
| 2004 | "Pride As Big As Texas" | Sonna Alton and Jerry Simoneaux | Sue and Jim Null | Lesbian Gay Rights Lobby of Texas | | |
| 2005 | "Equal Rights! No More! No Less! | Weldon Hickey and Deb Murphy | Dennis and Evelyn Schave | Bayou City Boys Club | | |
| 2006 | "Say It Out Loud!" | Phyllis Randolph Frye and Ray Ramirez | Rev. Marilyn Meeker-Williams | Bunnies on the Bayou | | |
| 2007 | "Lone Star Pride" | Jack Valinski and Maria Gonzalez | Garnet Coleman | The Imperial Court of Houston | | |
| 2008 | "We are Family" | Dalton DeHart and Kelly McCann | Julie Eberly | AIDS Foundation Houston, Inc. | | |
| 2009 | "Out 4 Justice" | James Knapp and Fiona Dawson | Mike and Linda Bratsen | Legacy Community Healthcare | | |
| 2010 | "Pride NOT Prejudice" | Gary Wood and Carol Wyatt | Ann Robison | Montrose Counseling Center | Mayor Annise Parker | Andy Cohen |
| 2011 | "Live. Love. Be." | Bryan Hlavinka and Tammi Wallace | Duane and Judy Roland | The GLBT Community Center | | Jonathan D. Lovitz |
| 2012 | "Live Out Proud" | Nicolas Brines, Jenifer Rene Pool and Council Member Ellen Cohen | | | Toro, mascot of the Houston Texans | Madison Hildebrand |
| 2013 | "Pride Unleashed" | John Nechman and Robin Brown | Januari Leo | | | |
| 2014 | "Carnivale" | JD Doyle and Christina Gorzynski | Sarah and Fernando Aramburo | | | |
| 2015 | "HEROES" | Ryan Levy and Britt Kornmann | Anna Eastman | | | |
| 2016 | "Houston Proud" | Bradley Odom-Harris and Fran Watson | Dena Gray Imran Yousef (Pulse Survivor) | | | |
| 2017 | "Wonderland" | Lou Weaver, Sallie Wyatt-Woodell, and Aimee Broadhurst | Tony Carroll, Marion Coleman, and Arden Eversmeyer | | | |
| 2018 | "#Pride40" | All former Grand Marshals | Bob Briddick, Julie Mabry, and Josephine Tittsworth | | | |
| 2019 | "Summer of '69" | Harrison Guy, Judge Shannon B. Baldwin, Mike Webb, and Constable Alan Rosen | Atlantis Narcisse, Dee Dee Watters, Ana Andrea Molina and Monica Roberts | | | |
| 2020 | "Divercity" | Cancelled caused by COVID-19 pandemic. Replaced with a virtual/online rally. | | | | |
| 2021 | "Divercity" | Cancelled by COVID-19 pandemic. Replaced with a mixture of virtual rallies and smaller in person gatherings across Houston. | | | | |
| 2022 | "Houston:The Beat Goes On" | | | | | |
| 2023 | "All We Need Is Love" | | | | | |

== See also ==
- LGBT culture in Houston
