= Galveston County Health District =

Galveston County Health District (GCHD) is a governmental agency based in Texas City, Texas. It is classified under Texas law as a local health district. In general the district includes Galveston County.

== History ==
In 1956 Joe Vickery (died 2015) began working for the health district, and he became the leader of the agency. In 1993 he retired from the agency and became the director emeritus.

In 2026 Philip Keiser, the CEO, stated that he was going to retire.

In 2026 the county board of commissioners voted to take over multiple functions that were previously handled by the GCHD. Some respondents stated in a Galveston County Daily News article that they were afraid of job losses.

== Animal services ==
Galveston County Animal Resource Center, an animal shelter operated by the GCHD, is in Texas City. As per a governmental agreement, this shelter and the associated animal control covers unincorporated areas as well as Bayou Vista, Clear Lake Shores, Hitchcock, Kemah, La Marque, Santa Fe, Texas City, and Tiki Island. Previously Dickinson contracted with the GCHD for animal services, but in 2015 had pulled out. Clear Lake Shores and Santa Fe had also pulled out, but have since rejoined.

Vickery made efforts to get multiple municipalities in Galveston County to collaborate on supporting a joint shelter. In 1993 the animal shelter was named after him. Shannon Daughtry and T.J. Aulds of the Galveston County Daily News wrote that "Vickery [...] is best known for his efforts to create a state-sanctioned animal shelter in Galveston County."

The current shelter was scheduled to have construction begin in June 2010 and was anticipated to be completed circa 2011. The intended cost was to be between $4,000,000-5,000,000. It was to replace the former Joe Vickery Animal Shelter.

== Clinic services ==
It runs health, dental, and counseling clinics under the Coastal Health & Wellness name. It has clinics in Galveston and Texas City.

== Emergency medical services ==
The Galveston Area Ambulance Authority (GAAA) is the emergency medical services agency for unincorporated areas and contracted to Bayou Vista, Clear Lake Shores, Galveston, Hitchcock, Jamaica Beach, Kemah, and Tiki Island. In 1975 the agency began providing EMS to Galveston Island.
