= Louis Dupré =

Louis Dupré (with variant spellings) may refer to:

- Louis Dupré (painter) (1789–1837), French painter
- Louis Dupré (dancer) (1690–1774), French balletmaster and dancer
- Louis Dupré (philosopher) (born 1925), Belgian-American philosopher
- L. G. Dupre (1932–2001), American football player
- Louis Dupree (professor) (1925–1989), American archaeologist
