= La Marque Independent School District =

Former school district in Texas

La Marque Independent School District (LMISD) was a public school district based in La Marque, Texas, in the Houston metropolitan area. In addition to much of La Marque, the district served Bayou Vista, Tiki Island, and portions of Texas City. As of July 1, 2016 it consolidated into the Texas City Independent School District (TCISD).

== History ==
In 2009, the school district was rated "academically acceptable" by the Texas Education Agency.

The Texas Education Agency's college readiness performance data shows that only 3.1% (5 out of 152 students) of the graduates of the class of 2010 of the La Marque school district met TEA's average performance criterion on SAT or ACT college admission tests.

In 2010, after some state budget cuts occurred, the district considered closing Inter-City Elementary School.

In 2011, the district was labeled academically unacceptable.

In March 2012 the district projected that it would have a $4.6 million deficit the following year. It considered closing Highlands Elementary School and Simms Elementary School to save $450,000.

In 2015 the district had 2,500 students. On February 6, 2015, the Texas Education Agency revoked the District's accreditation, citing unacceptable academic ratings, as well as its poor financial situation. In April of that year the decision was put on hold. On September 23, 2015, the Texas Education Commissioner announced that the superintendent and school board would be removed and replaced by a state-appointed board of managers, but that the schools would remain open. The board of managers must either dissolve the district or return it to local control within two years.

On November 12, 2015, La Marque ISD received a letter from TEA Commissioner Michael Williams advising the School Board that the district would be closed on July 1, 2016 and absorbed by another district. While it has not yet been announced who would be absorbing the district, Texas City ISD is the most likely candidate due to geographical location and is said to have a tentative plan in place to absorb the failed district, which includes keeping the campuses of LMISD open but under new administration. A conservator has been assigned by the TEA Commissioner to oversee the district and advise the school board for the remainder of the 15-16 school year.

On November 30, 2015, in a special meeting, the LMISD Board of trustees voted to hire a Houston Law firm at a cost of at least $300,000.00 to fight the decision by the TEA to close the district.

On December 2, 2015, TEA Commissioner Williams announced that Texas City ISD would absorb LMISD effective July 1, 2016; LMISD successfully met its academic standards but failed to meet its financial ones.

LMISD and TCISD students continued to attend their respective neighborhood schools for the 2016-2017 school year. LMISD schools remained open since there is not enough space at existing TCISD schools, and out of consideration of stability of the education of LMISD students. The athletic programs were not yet consolidated. All LMISD staff needed to reapply for their jobs for the 2016-2017 school year if they wished to keep them.

== School uniforms ==
Students from PreKindergarten to the 8th grade in the district required school uniforms or "standardized dress". The school required PreK-8 students to wear golf shirts colored navy, gold, or white and navy trousers. The Texas Education Agency specifies that the parents and/or guardians of students zoned to a school with uniforms may apply for a waiver to opt out of the uniform policy so their children do not have to wear the uniform; parents must specify "bona fide" reasons, such as religious reasons or philosophical objections.

High school students were permitted to wear solid-colored or striped golf shirts that do not have the colors red and black. Trousers were permitted to be navy, khaki, or denim.

In 2008 there was confusion on how the district's uniform rules should be interpreted.

== Schools ==
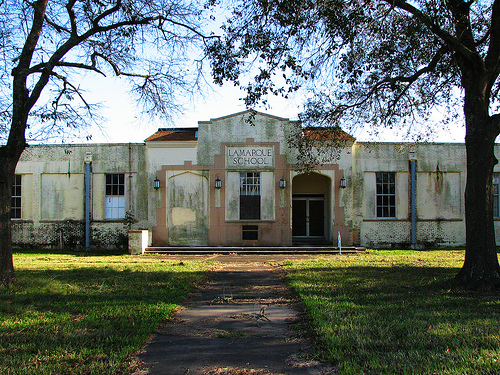
The former La Marque School, constructed in 1936 and closed in 1995.

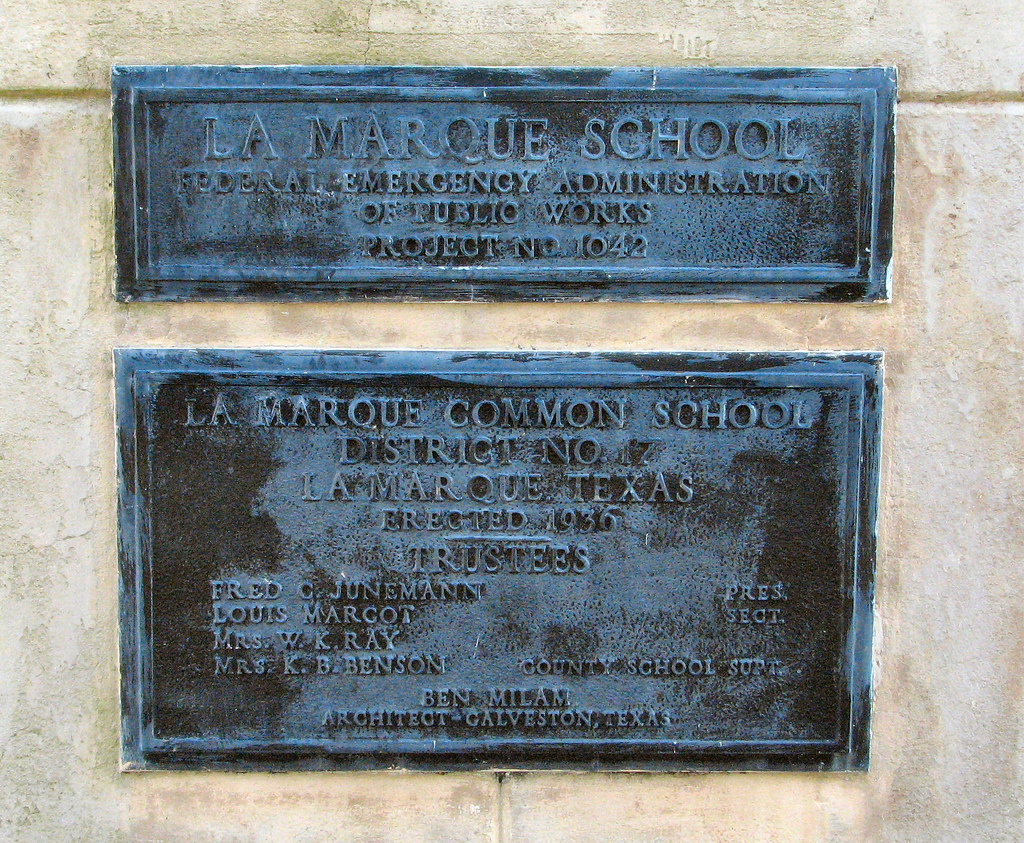
1936 dedication plaque for the La Marque school.

=== Schools ===
Open at time of district closure:

- La Marque High School
- Renaissance Academy
- La Marque Junior High
- La Marque Intermediate
- La Marque Elementary
- Early Childhood

Closed/repurposed prior to district closure:

- La Marque Middle School
- Highlands Elementary School
- Inter-City Elementary School
- Simms Elementary School
- Westlawn Elementary School

=== Partnership schools ===
- Collegiate High School, in association with College of the Mainland, a nearby community college
