= Charlie Dupre =

American football player (born 1933)

No. 28
- Position: Defensive back

Personal information
- Born: November 11, 1933 (age 92); Texas City, Texas, U.S.
- Listed height: 6 ft 1 in (1.85 m)
- Listed weight: 195 lb (88 kg)

Career information
- High school: Texas City
- College: Baylor (1953–1956)
- NFL draft: 1956: 6th round, 66th overall pick

Career history
- New York Titans (1960)
- Stats at Pro Football Reference

Charles Leroy Dupre (born November 11, 1933) is an American former professional football player who was a defensive back with the New York Titans of the American Football League (AFL). He played college football for the Baylor Bears.
