= Dion Dowell =

American professional basketball player

Personal information
- Born: June 11, 1985 (age 41) Berlin, Germany
- Listed height: 6 ft 7 in (2.01 m)

Career information
- High school: Texas City High School
- College: University of Texas; University of Houston

Dion Dowell (born June 11, 1985) is an American professional basketball player.

== Early life ==
A 6' 7" forward born in Berlin, Germany, Dowell helped lead his Texas City High School basketball team to the playoffs during his junior and senior seasons.

Dowell played college basketball at University of Texas.

He then transferred to University of Houston and played there for two seasons. As a Houston Cougar from 2006 to 2008, Dowell played in 61 games and averaged 11.0 points and 6.4 rebounds per game

As an active and athletic player with a quick second jump and creativity around the basket, Dowell's playing style has been compared to that of another 6' 7" forward, Shawn Marion.

== Professional career ==
A few days before he was released by the Golden State Warriors on October 9, 2008, Dowell played in his first and only National Basketball Association pre-season game for the Warriors. However, he never played for the team in-season.

Dowell joined Hapoel Gilboa Galil Elyon of Israel halfway through 2008/2009 season, and stayed with them also for the next season, during which he led them to the Israeli Championship, beating Maccabi Tel Aviv in the finals of the Israeli Final Four.

In August 2010, Dowell signed a 2-year contract to play for Hapoel Jerusalem, where he joined his former teammate Brian Randle and Coach Oded Katash.

In July 2011 Dowell signed with Habik'a B.C. which rose to the Israeli Basketball Super League by winning the 2nd Division title, he played there in the 2011/2012 season and was re-signed by the team when the club moved south and became Hapoel Eilat B.C. for the 2012/2013 season.
