= La Marque High School =

Public school in Texas, United States

Location
- 397 Duroux Rd, La Marque, TX 77568; La Marque, Galveston, Texas 77568; United States
- 29°22′33″N 94°59′39″W

Information
- School district: Texas City School District (2016-); La Marque Independent School District (-2016)
- Teaching staff: 55.57 (FTE)
- Enrollment: 699 (2023-2024)
- Student to teacher ratio: 12.54
- Colors: Navy, white, and gold
- Team name: Cougars
- Communities served: Much of La Marque, half of Tiki Island, Bayou Vista, and portions of Texas City
- Website: lmhs.tcisd.org

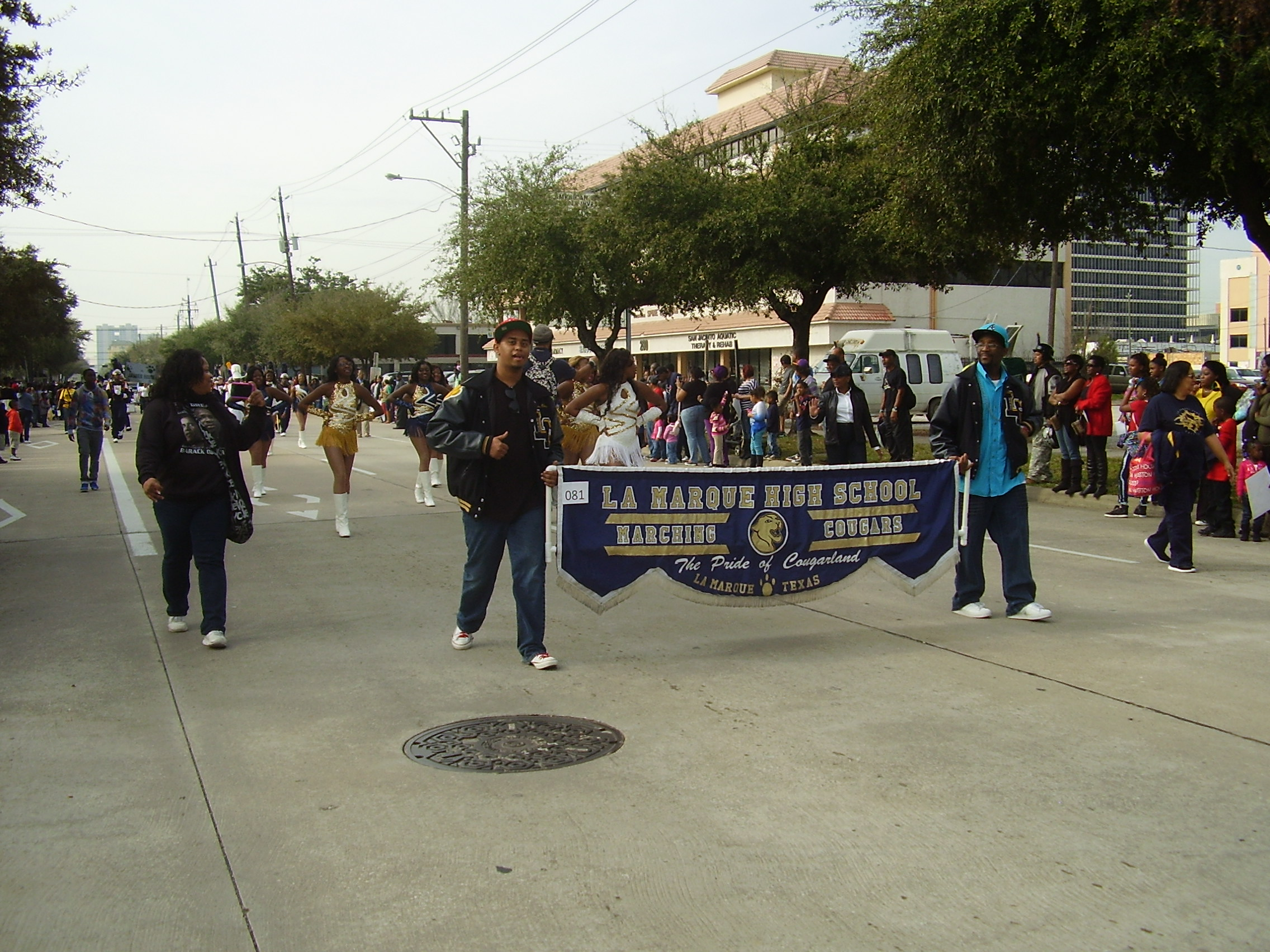
La Marque High School students at the 2013 Martin Luther King Day Parade in Midtown Houston

La Marque High School is a public high school in La Marque, Texas, United States in Greater Houston. The school, which serves grades 9 through 12, is a part of the Texas City Independent School District (TCISD); prior to July 1, 2016, the school district was a part of the La Marque Independent School District (LMISD). After TCISD annexed LMISD, the school remained open, and its athletic teams continued to be separate from those of Texas City High School.

As the LMISD school zones were retained after the merger, the school serves sections of La Marque, half of Tiki Island, all of Bayou Vista, and portions of Texas City. It has a total enrollment of 1400.

In February 2012, La Marque was reclassified as a University Interscholastic League 3A school, down from the 4A level.

== Dress code ==
As of July 1, 2016, La Marque High has no standardized dress policy since it now follows the TCISD school dress policy.

During the late 2000s through the closure of LMISD, the school had a dress code in which students were permitted to wear solid-colored or striped golf shirts that did not have the colors red and black. Allowed styles of trousers were navy, khaki, and denim.

== Athletics ==
From 1993 to 2010 the American football team entered into nine Texas championships. Beginning in 1993, the team played in 6 straight championship games having won the championship game three consecutive times in 1995, 1996 and 1997. Two more championships were added in 2003 and 2006. Prior to 2016 its last championship game was in 2010. Mike Jackson served as the head coach of the football team up until the closure of LMISD. Once the school came into possession of the TCISD, the position of football head coach became vacant as all teaching positions were cleared of their employees but jobs have been filled and the football head coach position is now filled by Shone Evans; employees who wished to continue were required to re-apply for the jobs.

== Feeder patterns ==
Hayley Elementary School, Sims Elementary School, and Sarah Giles Middle School are the zoned feeder schools.

== Notable alumni ==
- Brian Allen, NFL player
- Jeff Banister, Major League Baseball player, coach, and manager
- Norm Bulaich, Former National Football League player
- L. J. Castile, Arena Football League player
- James Francis, Former National Football League player
- Ron Francis, Former National Football League player
- Harrison Guy, dancer, choreographer, and activist
- Kay Bailey Hutchison (R), Former U.S. Senator from the state of Texas
- Jared Perry, Arena Football League player
- Claude Terrell, Former National Football League player
