= L. G. Dupre =

American football player (1932–2001)

L.G. Dupre
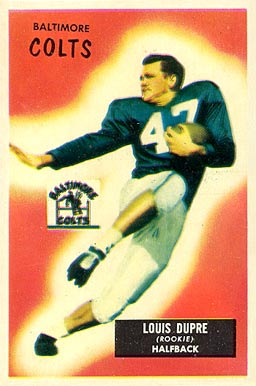
- Dupre on a 1955 Bowman football card

No. 45
- Position: Halfback

Personal information
- Born: September 10, 1932; New Orleans, Louisiana, U.S.
- Died: August 9, 2001 (aged 68); Texas City, Texas, U.S.
- Listed height: 5 ft 11 in (1.80 m)
- Listed weight: 190 lb (86 kg)

Career information
- High school: Texas City
- College: Baylor (1951–1954)
- NFL draft: 1955: 3rd round, 27th overall pick

Career history
- Baltimore Colts (1955–1959); Dallas Cowboys (1960–1961)

Awards and highlights
- 2× NFL champion (1958, 1959); SWC Sophomore of the Year (1952); 2× Second-team All-SWC (1952, 1953); Third-team All-SWC (1954)

Career NFL statistics
- Rushing yards: 1,761
- Rushing average: 3.7
- Receptions: 104
- Receiving yards: 1,131
- Total touchdowns: 18
- Stats at Pro Football Reference

Louis George Dupre (September 10, 1932 – August 9, 2001) was a professional American football running back in the National Football League (NFL) for the Baltimore Colts and Dallas Cowboys. He played college football at Baylor University.

== Biography ==
=== Early life ===
Dupre attended Texas City High School in Texas City, Texas.

On April 16, 1947, Dupre was on his way to school, carrying his books and walking along the sea wall. Suddenly there was a gigantic explosion that threw him from his feet, briefly knocking him unconscious. A chain reaction of mighty explosions followed, sending jagged shards of debris through the air.

"I stayed huddled up for a while because I was plenty scared," Dupre recalled. "I thought it was an earthquake. Then I thought it was an atom bomb. I didn't know what it was.... I didn't know the whole town was blowing up. I ran to where the school was and just happened to meet my brother by accident. All the buildings were leveled. Ambulances were racing all over the place. Our whole town was ripped apart. It seemed like everybody was cut and bleeding. My two cousins were killed."

Approximately 650 people were killed in what is today remembered as the Texas City disaster, caused when a fire aboard a docked transport ship ignited 2,300 tons of ammonium nitrate and thereby beginning a chain reaction of exploding warehouses and oil storage facilities.

=== College career ===
Dupre accepted a football scholarship from Baylor University. In 1953, he was part of a backfield that became known as the “Fearsome Foursome”, that comprised him, quarterback Cotton Davidson, halfback Jerry Coody and fullback Allen Jones. That season, he set a school record by rushing for 593 yards.

In his last two years at Baylor, the team went 7–3 and 7–4 and played in the Gator Bowl in 1954. He played a key role in the 1955 College All-Star's victory over the Cleveland Browns.

He was given the nickname "Long Gone" by sportscaster Kern Tips. He finished his career with 311 carries for 1,423 yards and 19 touchdowns. In 1981, he was inducted into Baylor's Athletic Hall of Fame.

== Professional career ==
=== Baltimore Colts ===
Dupre was selected by the Baltimore Colts in the third-round (27th overall) of the 1955 NFL draft. As a rookie, he was second on the team in rushing (behind Alan Ameche), registering 88 carries for 338 yards, with most of his production coming after the fifth game.

In 1956 with the addition of rookie Lenny Moore, he was forced to develop into a receiver out of the backfield and was third on the team with 216 receiving yards. His production would decrease in the following seasons, with Moore taking a bigger role in the offense. He also was a part-time punter.

In 1957, he was fourth on the team with 32 receptions for 339 yards. He was a part of the 1958 NFL Championship Game against the New York Giants, famously known as "The Greatest Game Ever Played". He started the game by gaining 30 yards on 10 carries.

In 1959, Dupre played in only the first 4 regular games of the season. His only touchdown was a 2-yard pass from John Unitas against the Chicago Bears on October 18. He sustained a season-ending injury while driving home from a Tuesday practice. He put on the brakes and felt something pop in his leg, that caused ruptured blood vessels in his thigh. Dupre was a member of the 1959 Baltimore Colts championship team, but due to his injury, he did not play in the rematch against the Giants, which the Colts won 31-16. Halfback Mike Sommer substituted for Dupre in the 1959 NFL Championship Game.

Hall of Famer Art Donovan had this to say of Dupre: "But the running back who was really something, the guy who could really fight, was a teammate of mine named L.G. DuPre. Louis George DuPre to his family; Long Gone DuPre to the rest of the world. Long Gone grew up in Texas City, Texas, the oil refinery town that blew up back in the 1940s. He was playing hooky from school that day and was out fishing at the end of a jetty, so he wasn't hurt. But L.G. had an amazing childhood, primarily because his father used to bring L.G. and his brother into barrooms and let them fight each other while he passed the hat. They used to whale the tar out of each other, from what I understand. I met his father once. And I asked him if the story was true. Mr. DuPre said, 'Sure is, son. We used to pass the hat. Turned quite a nice dollar, too.' Now, that is one tough sonofabitch. And L.G. grew up just like his daddy. He wouldn't take a back step to anyone. All these other galoots in the league, they'd just swing and get swung at during a rumble. Their heads were all hard enough to withstand just about anything. But L.G., there was a scientific fighter. I can still picture him out in the middle of some brawl on the field feinting and jabbing and, boom, he'd unload that right hand and coldcock the poor sucker who was foolish enough to be mixing it up with him."

=== Dallas Cowboys ===
Dupre was selected by the Dallas Cowboys in the 1960 NFL expansion draft. In the Cowboys 1960 inaugural season, he led the team in rushing with 104 carries for 362 yards in 11 games (5 starts). He also scored 3 touchdowns in the tie against the New York Giants, helping avoid losing all of the games in the season.

In 1961, his role was reduced with the emergence of Don Perkins and Amos Marsh. He was released on September 4, 1962.

A Baltimore Sun article on October 2, 1962, indicated that the Baltimore Colts were interested in signing him to replace Lenny Moore, in case his injuries were serious enough to keep him from playing. The Sun reporter spoke with Dupre's wife in Dallas and she explained that Dupre had to first check with his employer (General Electric) about a leave of absence. She indicated that he had a good job and did not want to lose it. His wife was still Sissy Dupre. He stayed retired from professional football and did not return to Baltimore.

== Personal life ==
Dupre married wife Alda Maxine (Sissy) Dupre on February 4, 1955 in Waco, Texas. On August 9, 2001, he died after a lengthy battle with cancer. His brother Charlie Dupre also played football in Baylor University and in the National Football League.

While playing in Baltimore, Dupre worked for Bethlehem Steel and Montgomery Wards during the off season. In 1959, Dupre was involved in a bowling establishment venture with Unitas, who served as president of "The Pro Bowl", whilst Dupre was executive V.P. Apparently, the business relationship ended relatively quickly: when Unitas was sued in July 1964 by bowling manufacturer, Brunswick Corporation, Dupre's name and "The Pro Bowl" were nowhere in sight. Instead, the names of Colts owner Carroll Rosenbloom and Colts General Manager Donald Kellet were included in the suit.
