= Texas City Independent School District =

School district in Texas, United States

Address
- 1700 9th Ave North Texas City, Texas, 77590; United States of America

District information
- Type: Public
- Grades: PK–12
- Superintendent: Melissa Duarte Ed.D.
- Governing agency: Texas Education Agency
- Schools: 15
- NCES District ID: 4842510

Students and staff
- Students: 7,874 (2023–2024)
- Teachers: 553.44 (on an FTE basis) (2023–2024)
- Staff: 763.04 (on an FTE basis) (2023–2024)
- Student–teacher ratio: 14.23 (2023–2024)

Other information
- Website: www.tcisd.org

Texas City Independent School District is a public school district based in Texas City, Texas. It serves most of Texas City and La Marque as well as a portion of Tiki Island.

In 2009, the school district was rated "academically acceptable" by the Texas Education Agency.

== History ==
Beginning in the 1870s, children in the small developing town of Texas City, Tx were educated in various locations throughout the city by an ever-changing staff of teachers, as there was no formal education system yet available to the town. This all changed, however, in December 1904 as the very first School Board of Trustees were elected and by January of the following year the new board established the Texas City Independent School District. The first formal school in TCISD, Central School, was housed in a small wooden building on 3rd Ave and educated students from first to eight grade. As the town quickly grew and Central School was outgrown, the town held and passed a bond election in 1910 to build Kohfeldt Elementary School on land which was donated by Franz Kohfeldt and would house students from the first through fifth grades, as well as the Wolvin School, which educated students from sixth through eleventh grades and was built at the intersection of 3rd Street and 6th Avenue N. on land donated by A.B. Wolvin. These two schools were both completed and opened in 1912, followed by the Gonne School in 1920 which was a two story office building converted to house the cities students in fifth, sixth and seventh grades. Also, in 1912, the cities first school for black students was opened at the First Baptist Church on first avenue with Mrs. Drucilla Kittrell teaching grades one through seven.

In the late 1920s the city saw continued growth and in 1928 passed more bond issues allowing for the construction of the new Central High School which would house students from eighth to eleventh grades, as well as the conversion of Wolvin High School into an elementary school.

As the city continued to grow into the mid 1930s yet another bond issue was passed to expand the high school adding a gymnasium, home economics and vocational facilities in separate buildings on the sight of Central High. Also two new elementary schools, Danforth and Heights, would be open in September 1939 and the aging facilities of Kofheldt, Wolvin and Gonne would be closed. However, in 1941, Wolvin would reopen as a Junior High to help ease overcrowding, but was then heavily damaged by a hurricane in 1943 and would be closed again, this time permanently.

In 1945, a new brick building would be built to educate the black residents of Texas City from the first through seventh grades on the site of the existing Booker T. Washington School as it was called since the late 1930s by principal George Sanders. Those black students who wished to attend high school had to travel to Central High School in nearby Galveston, Tx.

In July 1945 a new bond issue totaling $750,000.00 passed providing the district with enough funding for several new facilities which included a new building for black eighth and ninth graders at Booker T. Washington, a new high school on 14th Ave which would be called Texas City High School, Roosevelt Elementary and Wilson Elementary.

Kofheldt Elementary was rebuilt in 1954 along with the new schools of Levi Fry Intermediate and Northside Elementary. Also around this time a new Texas City High School was constructed on 9th Avenue and the previous location was transitioned into William R. Blocker Middle School.

Roosevelt and Wilson Elementary schools were combined to form Roosevelt-Wilson Elementary in the 1970s as the city's growth began to stabilize.

Heights Elementary and Roosevelt Elementary would later be built on the same sight as the original schools in 1995.

In November 2007 a very large bond issue was presented to the community for a vote which would allow for the building of a new Levi Fry Intermediate at a new location on the north side of town, a new Kofheldt Elementary behind the existing high school, a new high school on the sight now vacated by the old Levi Fry and Kohfeldt, the old Texas City High School would be renovated as the new Blocker Middle School and part of Blocker would be renovated as the new Woodrow Wilson DAEP. With the building of the new schools, renovations to several more including Stingaree Stadium which was opened in 1957, the district was able to save enough money to almost completely demolish the old high school and build a brand new Blocker Middle School at the sight.

On December 2, 2015, Texas Education Agency Commissioner Michael Williams announced that Texas City ISD would absorb the La Marque Independent School District (LMISD) effective July 1, 2016. By February 2016 TCISD began doing job interviews of teachers at LMISD schools, and it was checking to see what renovations are needed at LMISD schools. The LMISD annexation increased the size of TCISD by about 33%.

== Schools ==
=== Secondary schools ===
- Texas City High School (9-12)
- La Marque High School (9-12)
- TCISD Industrial Trades Center
- Woodrow Wilson Disciplinary Alternative Education Program School (5-12)
- Blocker Middle School (7-8) - Texas City
- Giles Middle School (6-8)

=== Primary schools ===
- Levi Fry Intermediate School (5-6)
- Heights Elementary School (K-4)
- Kohfeldt Elementary School (K-4)
- Guajardo Jr. Elementary School (K-4) ( Formerly Northside)
- Roosevelt-Wilson Elementary School (K-4)
- Calvin Vincent Early Childhood Learning Center (Pre-K and Head Start, Ages 3 & 4)
- Simms Elementary School (K-5)
- Hayley Elementary School (K-5)

=== Sports ===
Texas City High School has repeatedly produced winning records in numerous sports throughout the years. Originally in Class 5A Division I league, it was moved down to Class 4A in 1996 due to lower enrollment. Since the realignment of UIL divisions, Texas City is once again 5A. Even with its enrollment being between 3,000 and 4,000, the school has made several trips to the state playoffs in both divisions. It has two State Championships in football (1997 and 1999) as well as deep runs into the playoffs in Men's basketball, Men's and Women's Soccer, and has State Championships in Golf, Tennis, Swimming, and Track & Field. TCHS also has an award-winning drill team, known as the Stingarettes, and a National Champion cheerleading squad who has brought home many honors since the school has opened.

La Marque High School competes in Class 4A.

== Demographics ==
The Hispanic and Latino population's percentage of the overall population of Texas City had increased to 29.9% in 2017 from 27% in 2010, and as a result TCISD increased services catering to Hispanics.

== Dress code ==
Initially the La Marque PreKindergarten through 8 schools were to continue having mandatory school uniforms after being acquired by TCISD. La Marque High has no standardized dress policy since it began following the TCISD school dress policy. However the TCISD school board decided that requiring uniforms at much of its schools would be difficult as its other schools had not adopted uniforms, so the board decided to make school uniforms optional. In July 2016 the district voted to end mandatory uniforms at former La Marque campuses.

== Notable alumni ==
- Vernon Crawford - Pro Football (New England Patriots)
- Dion Dowell (born 1985) - Pro Basketball
- John Lee Hancock - American screenwriter, film director, and producer
- Max Hopper - Executive vice president and CIO, Bank of America
- Reggie Rusk - Pro Football (San Diego Chargers)
- Diron Talbert - Pro Football
- Don Talbert - Pro Football
- E. J. Whitley - Pro Football
- L.G. Dupre - Pro Football (Baltimore Colts-Dallas Cowboys)
