= Hitchcock Independent School District =

School district in Texas, United States

Address
- 7801 Neville Avenue Building B Hitchcock, Texas, 77563; United States

District information
- Grades: PK–12
- Schools: 5
- NCES District ID: 4823310

Students and staff
- Students: 1,899 (2023–2024)
- Teachers: 122.61 (on an FTE basis) (2023–2024)
- Staff: 183.26 (on an FTE basis) (2023–2024)
- Student–teacher ratio: 15.49 (2023–2024)

Other information
- Website: www.hitchcockisd.org

Hitchcock Independent School District is a public school district based in Hitchcock, Texas, United States. In addition to Hitchcock, the district serves parts of La Marque and Tiki Island and the Saltgrass Crossing Subdivision.

In 2009, the school district was rated "academically acceptable" by the Texas Education Agency.

For the 2015- 2016 school year, Hitchcock ISD received an "Improvement Required" accountability rating from the Texas Education Agency.

Hitchcock ISD received a warning for low accountability marks in 2011 and 2013.

== Schools ==
- Hitchcock High School (Grades 9-12)
- Crosby Middle School (Grades 6-8)
- Stewart Elementary School (Grades 3-5)
- Hitchcock Primary (Grades PK-2)
