= College of the Mainland =

Community college in Texas City, Texas, U.S.

- Type: Public community college
- Established: 1966
- Accreditation: SACS
- President: Helen Castellanos Brewer
- Undergraduates: 4,335 (Fall 2021)
- Location: Texas City, Texas, United States; 29°23′43″N 94°59′58″W
- Campus: Urban
- Colors: Blue, Red and Yellow
- Nickname: Fighting Ducks
- Website: www.com.edu

College of the Mainland (COM) is a public community college in Texas City, Texas. Its name comes from its location on the "mainland" portion of Galveston County, Texas (the portion north of Galveston Island).

== History ==
The College of the Mainland was launched in late 1966 when the voters of Dickinson, Hitchcock, La Marque, Santa Fe, and Texas City approved a building-bond issue of $2,850,000, having been largely an idea since 1935. Herbert F. Stallworth, who previously had helped establish two colleges, was selected to head the new college in April 1967, and Fred A. Taylor was appointed dean of instruction. Classes were begun in temporary quarters in 1967. On March 21, 1970, the administration building, learning-resources center, math and science building, and technical-vocational building were completed, and the College of the Mainland moved to its new campus on Palmer Highway.

On May 16, 1970, residents of the college district approved $4.75 million for a second phase of construction. The campus was expanded to include a fine arts building, a physical education complex, and a student center. The math-science and technical-vocational buildings were improved. In 1984, the college constructed a third addition to the technical-vocational building. In 1991, it completed two industrial education buildings to house auto mechanics and diesel technology programs. In 1999, a new public service careers building opened to provide classrooms and labs for EMS, fire and police academies as well as housing the college's pharmacy technician program.

The college garnered national attention in 2002 when political-science instructor and self-avowed Marxist David Michael Smith applied for tenure, prompting vocal opposition from some residents and another former professor, Howard Katz. The then-college president Ralph Holm and Smith's department and many former students supported Smith's application and he was granted tenure.

In 2003, the college opened the COM Learning Center-North County in League City, Texas, part of COM's extended service area. The center is a leased facility that offers college credit and continuing-education classes, as well as dental-assistant, medical-assistant, and other health-care programs.

In 2004, the college became one of only three in Texas to offer a collegiate high school program on its campus, allowing high-school students to complete their last two years on a college campus while earning an associate degree.

In 2009, Dr. Michael A. Elam became the college's seventh president. After months of contract-renewal negotiations, Dr. Elam resigned in November 2011 in a $191,000 settlement that involved him going on sabbatical through November 2012. Larry Durrence was named interim president effective January 2012. Dr. Beth Lewis became president in 2013 and Dr. Warren Nichols assumed the presidency on Feb. 13, 2017.

In April 2010, the College of the Mainland, acting under then President Michael Elam, sought to modify the way union fees were deducted from faculty pay. Smith and a number of concerned parties raised an issue with this change in policy. Smith, the president of the Faculty Union (COM-Unity) attended a subsequent board of trustees meeting and objected to the change. After Elam reprimanded Smith, gave him a negative performance evaluation, and removed from the hiring board, Smith successfully sued the college. In 2013, Smith was formally disciplined for violations of policy and fired shortly thereafter.

== Academics ==
Besides traditional community-college transfer classes, vocational programs, and continuing-education courses, the college offers a process-technology degree for those seeking employment as operators in the refineries and other petroleum-related plants.

=== ESL/GED education ===
COM provides free general education development (GED) and English as a second language (ESL) classes to individuals at locations throughout Galveston County.

Adult basic education courses teach students reading, writing, and mathematics skills and help prepare them for the GED test. The nine-week courses are tuition-free. Students who complete this course and obtain their GED participate in a graduation ceremony.

The free ESL classes help students improve their ability to read, write, understand, and speak the English language.

=== High school programs ===
COM offers a collegiate high school, which allows students to earn an associate degree by high-school graduation. Students can also remain involved in extracurricular activities at their home high schools.

Dual-credit classes at the COM main campus at the COM Learning Center-North County in League City, or at the high school students' main campuses, allow students to earn high-school and college credit simultaneously.

Upward Bound, a federally funded program, is open to students from low-income families, who have disabilities, or who will be the first in their families to graduate from college. The program helps them with tutoring, visits to universities, and academic advising.

== Demographics ==
The Hispanic and Latino population's percentage of the overall population of Texas City had increased to 29.9% in 2017 from 27% in 2010, and as a result, over 25% of the students at COM are Hispanic or Latino as of 2019.

== Student life ==
COM students can participate in competitive club sports, including flag football, soccer, and basketball. Over 20 student clubs and organizations, from the Gamers Union to Art Club, meet on campus. COM also has a Five Star Chapter of Phi Theta Kappa, the national community-college honor society that conducts projects on campus and in the community.

== Allegations of hiring discrimination ==
In September 2007, the Texas City and Galveston chapters of the League of United Latin American Citizens accused four of the seven trustees of racism after a 4–3 vote against hiring Hispanic Juan Garcia of Tarrant County College to the post vice president of Student Services (which had been vacant for a year prior), despite a recommendation from President Hayes. Board of trustees member Don Criss, who voted in the majority, said in regards to the decision, "There's no race involved." Jesse Ponce, president of the Texas City chapter of LULAC, through a spokesperson, countered, saying, "To note that 'race played no part' in the rejection is pretty ridiculous..."

== Fine arts ==
The COM Fine Arts Department creates opportunities for students and community members to acquire skills in the areas of art, drama, and music. Classes in these areas are for students who seek personal enrichment, continue their education at transfer institutions, pursue individual expression, or pursue careers in the arts.

Since 1972, COM Community Theatre has presented over 228 productions, including children's theatre, concerts, and workshops, with attendance of more than 250,000 people. The theater has been recognized as one of America's leading community theaters, setting high production standards and developing one of this country's most innovative programs.

The COM Art Gallery serves as a resource for the study of art and art history, and presents works demonstrating contemporary standards of quality. It is free and open to the public Monday to Thursday, 10 am to 4 pm and by appointment. Exhibitions include paintings, drawings, print media, sculpture, ceramics, mixed media, film, digital media (including movie and still photography), and site-specific installations that are culturally significant and creatively express personal views.

COM Vocal Arts offers two choirs open to community members. The COM Mainland Singers meet Monday evenings and Mainland Chorale practices Tuesday evenings. The COM choirs toured Ireland in 2014.

The COM Music Program is among the most respected community-college music programs in the Houston/Galveston area. More than 100 music students attend each year, participating in six varied ensembles and pursuing their goals in performance and music education. Many COM students have made appearances with community-college all-state performing ensembles, and some ensembles have performed at national conferences and in Europe. The program's instrumental ensembles are open to community members and degree-seeking students.

== Governance and service area ==
The college is governed by a seven-member board of trustees elected to six-year terms by the residents of the college district.

As defined by the Texas Legislature, the official service area of COM includes:

- the Dickinson, Friendswood, Hitchcock, Santa Fe, and Texas City school districts (the legislature also defined the former La Marque ISD, now a part of TCISD, within the College of the Mainland zone), and
- the portion of the Clear Creek Independent School District located within Galveston County.
