= La Marque, Texas =

City of La Marque
- City
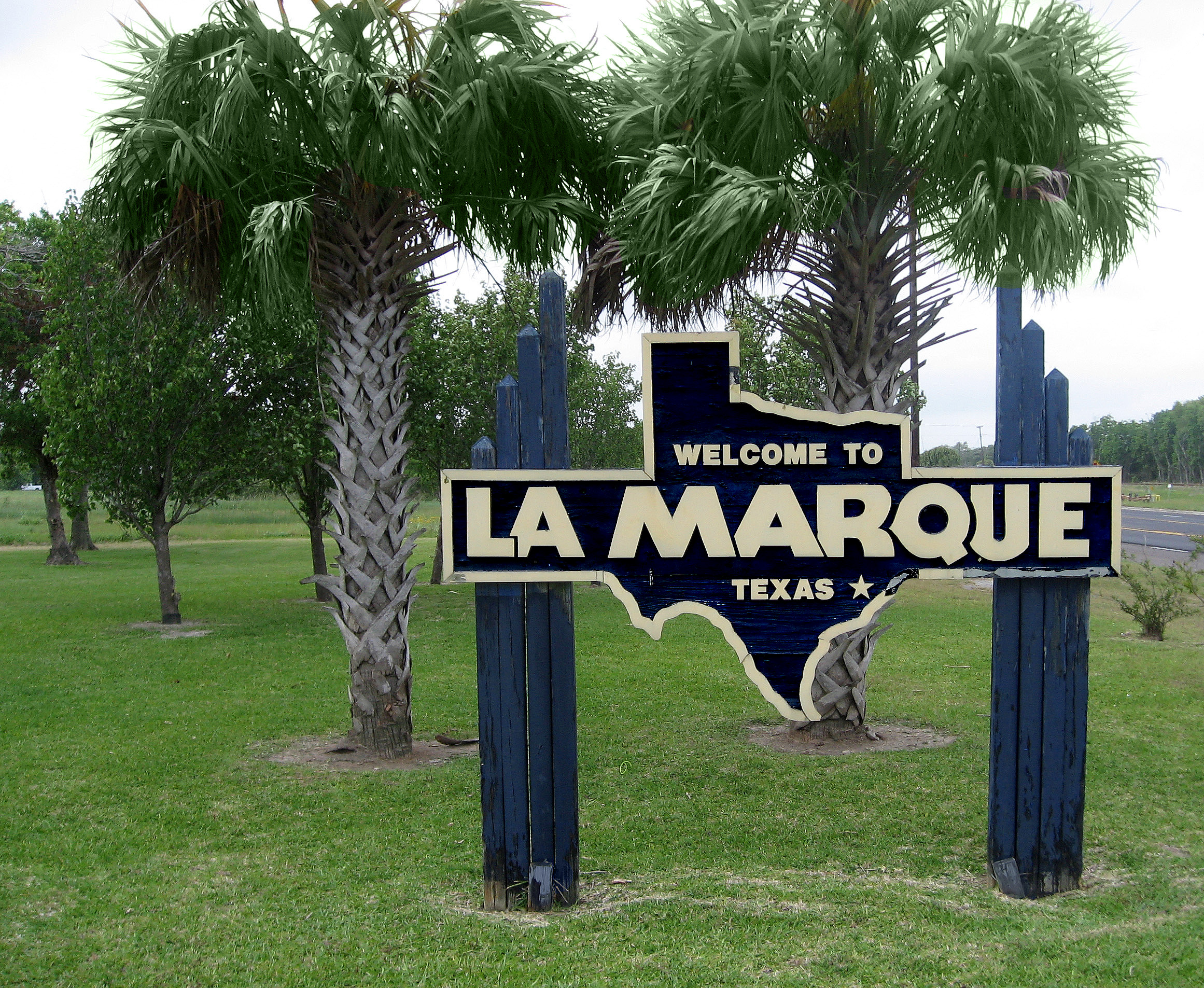
- Welcome to La Marque

- Location of La Marque, Texas
- Coordinates: 29°22′0″N 94°58′26″W
- Country: United States
- State: Texas
- County: Galveston

Area
  - Total: 14.28 sq mi (36.98 km^{2})
  - Land: 13.75 sq mi (35.62 km^{2})
  - Water: 0.53 sq mi (1.36 km^{2})
- Elevation: 16 ft (5 m)

Population (2020)
  - Total: 18,030
  - Density: 1,259.1/sq mi (486.16/km^{2})
- Time zone: UTC-6 (Central (CST))
  - Summer (DST): UTC-5 (CDT)
- ZIP code: 77568
- Area code: 409
- FIPS code: 48-41116
- GNIS feature ID: 1377749
- Website: www.cityoflamarque.gov

La Marque (/lə ˈmɑːrk/ lə MARK) is a city in Galveston County, Texas, United States, suburb of Galveston. The city population in 2020 was 18,030. La Marque experienced considerable growth in the 1950s, during which the city provided a general administrative and trades and crafts workforce helping to support the petrochemical complex in adjoining Texas City. It is the hometown of U.S. Senator Kay Bailey Hutchison and Norman Bulaich.

== History ==
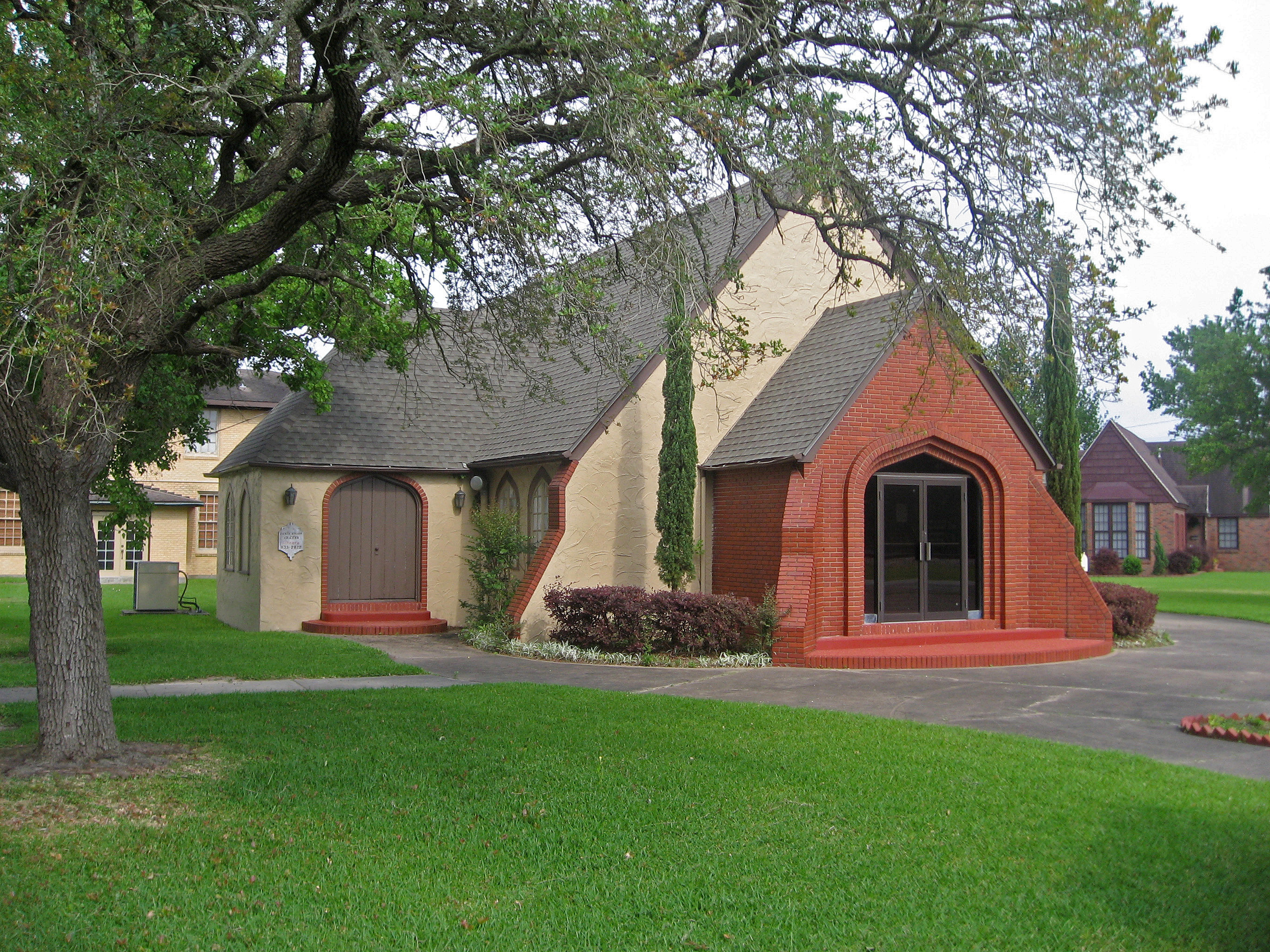
Paul's Union Church, La Marque, Texas

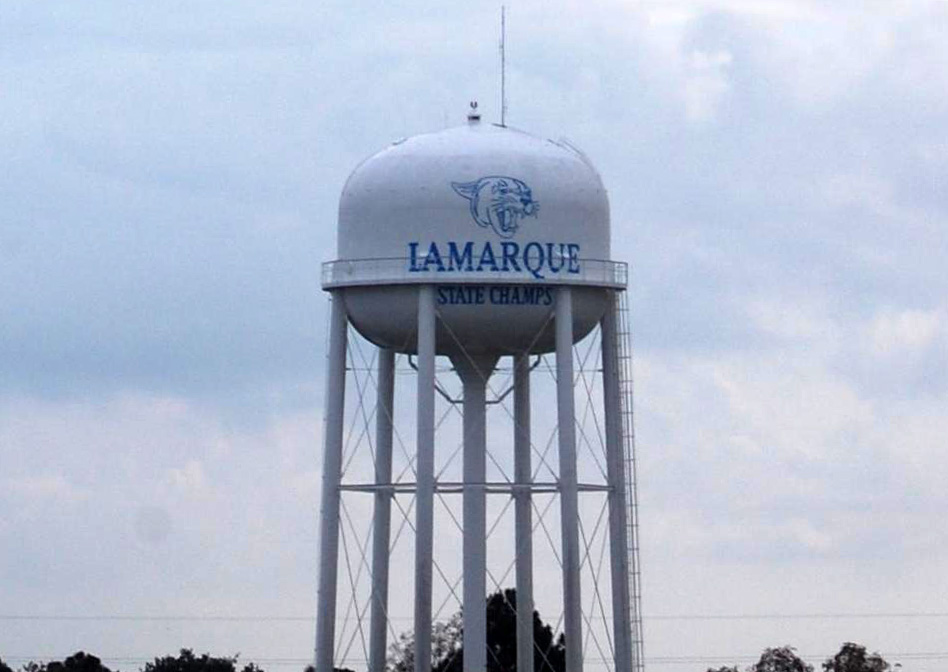
The La Marque water tower

La Marque, also once known as Highlands and Buttermilk Station, is an incorporated residential community on Interstate Highway 45, State Highway 3, and Farm Roads 519, 1765, and 2004, some 12 miles northwest of Galveston in northwestern Galveston County. The community was originally known as Highlands, probably for its location near Highland Creek, and was renamed in the 1890s when residents learned of another mainland community of the same name. Madam St. Ambrose, a French Catholic Ursuline Sister and postmistress, chose the new name, which in French means "the mark".

The community's post office operated from 1887 until the 1930s. During the Civil War, the town was known as Buttermilk Junction after the soldiers' practice of purchasing buttermilk there on the trip between Galveston and Houston. In 1867, the town had six families and its residents raised cattle or rice. The local population rose from 100 in 1890 to 175 in 1896, when the community had a Baptist church and several fruit growers. A school with 14 students existed before 1895, when Amos Stewart gave land for a larger facility. By 1909, two teachers served an enrollment of 55 students, and in 1913, further construction began.

By 1914, the community had been reached by four railroads: the International and Great Northern; the Galveston, Houston and Henderson; the Missouri, Kansas and Texas; and the Interurban. At that time, La Marque had both a railroad station and general store located in a private home. The town's population reached 500 in 1914 and 1,500 by 1952, when it had 90 businesses. As it grew together with nearby Texas City, La Marque served as a residential community for employees at nearby industrial facilities (e.g., chemical plants and refineries) in the La Marque-Texas City area, as well as the Galveston Island Medical Center. The town had a population of 17,000 and 130 businesses in 1977. In 1988, it had 15,697 residents and 158 businesses, and in 1991, some 14,258 residents and 272 businesses.

In the 2000s, rising real estate costs in Galveston forced many families to move to other areas, including La Marque. This meant an influx of children from the Galveston Independent School District into other school districts.

== Geography and Climate ==
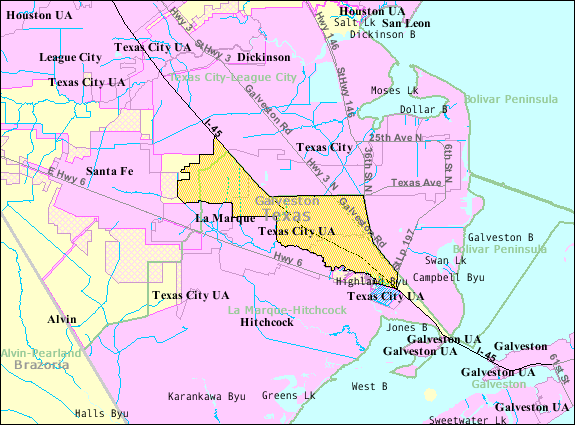
Map of La Marque

La Marque is located at 29°22′00″N 94°58′26″W (29.366684, –94.973922).

According to the United States Census Bureau, the city has a total area of 14.3 square miles (37 km^{2}), of which 0.04 square miles (0.10 km^{2}) (0.28%) is covered by water.

It is in Planting Zone 9B.

=== Climate ===
La Marque has a fairly unique climate when compared to most of the United States. La Marque is located within a Humid Subtropical biome, but the weather closely resembles that of a South Florida Tropical biome most of the year with high humidity and warm temps. Rainfall is high and evenly distributed year-round, although can be more frequent and intense in May through October in the warmer summer months in large part due to daily seabreeze induced thunderstorms, and the occasional Tropical Cyclone. According to PRISM and NCEI data, La Marque averages between 56 and 62 inches of rainfall annually, ranking it close up there with neighboring Gulf Coast cities as some of the nation's wetter regions.

Climate data for La Marque, Texas
Month	Jan	Feb	Mar	Apr	May	Jun	Jul	Aug	Sep	Oct	Nov	Dec	Year
Average precipitation inches	5.32	2.69	3.42	3.90	4.61	6.04	5.31	6.21	8.70	5.86	4.30	6.36	62.72
Average precipitation mm	135	68	87	99	117	153	135	158	221	149	109	162	1,593
Source: https://www.ncei.noaa.gov/access/us-climate-normals/#dataset=normals-annualseasonal&timeframe=30&station=US1TXGV0051

== Demographics ==
Historical population
Census	Pop.	Note	%±
1960	13,969		—
1970	16,131		15.5%
1980	15,372		−4.7%
1990	14,120		−8.1%
2000	13,682		−3.1%
2010	14,509		6.0%
2020	18,030		24.3%
U.S. Decennial Census

=== 2020 census ===
As of the 2020 census, La Marque had a population of 18,030, 6,707 households, and 4,229 families. The median age was 38.6 years.

23.6% of residents were under the age of 18 and 16.8% of residents were 65 years of age or older. For every 100 females there were 91.7 males, and for every 100 females age 18 and over there were 89.2 males age 18 and over.

98.4% of residents lived in urban areas, while 1.6% lived in rural areas.

There were 6,707 households in La Marque, of which 33.8% had children under the age of 18 living in them. Of all households, 42.0% were married-couple households, 18.0% were households with a male householder and no spouse or partner present, and 32.3% were households with a female householder and no spouse or partner present. About 24.8% of all households were made up of individuals and 11.1% had someone living alone who was 65 years of age or older.

There were 7,318 housing units, of which 8.3% were vacant. The homeowner vacancy rate was 2.3% and the rental vacancy rate was 8.5%.

Racial composition as of the 2020 census
Race	Number	Percent
White	7,814	43.3%
Black or African American	5,670	31.4%
American Indian and Alaska Native	175	1.0%
Asian	283	1.6%
Native Hawaiian and Other Pacific Islander	38	0.2%
Some other race	1,605	8.9%
Two or more races	2,445	13.6%
Hispanic or Latino (of any race)	5,181	28.7%

=== 2000 census ===
As of the census of 2000, 13,682 people, 5,237 households, and 3,713 families resided in the city. The population density was 962.0 inhabitants per square mile (371.4/km^{2}). The 5,732 housing units averaged 403.0 per square mile (155.6/km^{2}). The racial makeup of the city was 55.84% White, 34.69% African American, 0.46% Native American, 0.47% Asian, 6.24% from other races, and 2.31% from two or more races. Hispanics or Latinos of any race were 15.43% of the population.

Of the 5,237 households, 30.4% had children under the age of 18 living with them, 48.3% were married couples living together, 17.2% had a female householder with no husband present, and 29.1% were not families. About 24.7% of all households were made up of individuals, and 10.7% had someone living alone who was 65 years of age or older. The average household size was 2.58 and the average family size was 3.06.

In the city, the age distribution was 25.7% under 18, 9.0% from 18 to 24, 26.2% from 25 to 44, 23.5% from 45 to 64, and 15.6% who were 65 or older. The median age was 38 years. For every 100 females, there were 90.4 males. For every 100 females 18 and over, there were 86.9 males.

The median income for a household in the city was $34,841, and for a family was $39,081. Males had a median income of $32,099 versus $27,292 for females. The per capita income for the city was $17,518. About 13.5% of families and 17.5% of the population were below the poverty line, including 26.6% of those under age 18 and 9.8% of those age 65 or over.

== Government and infrastructure ==
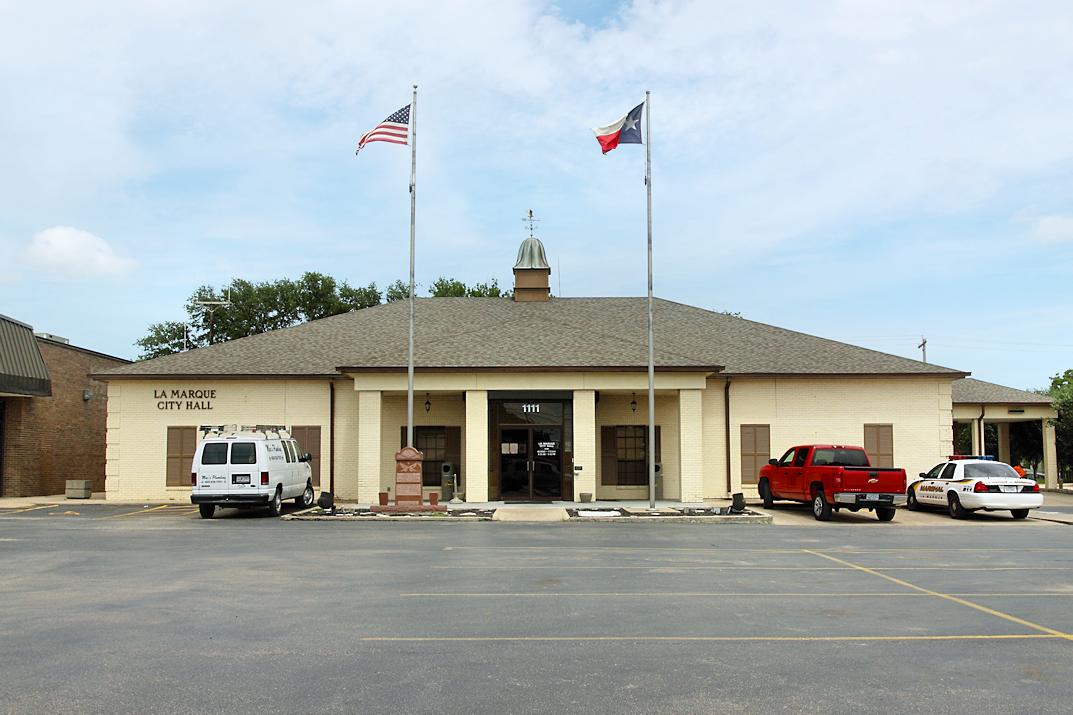
La Marque City Hall

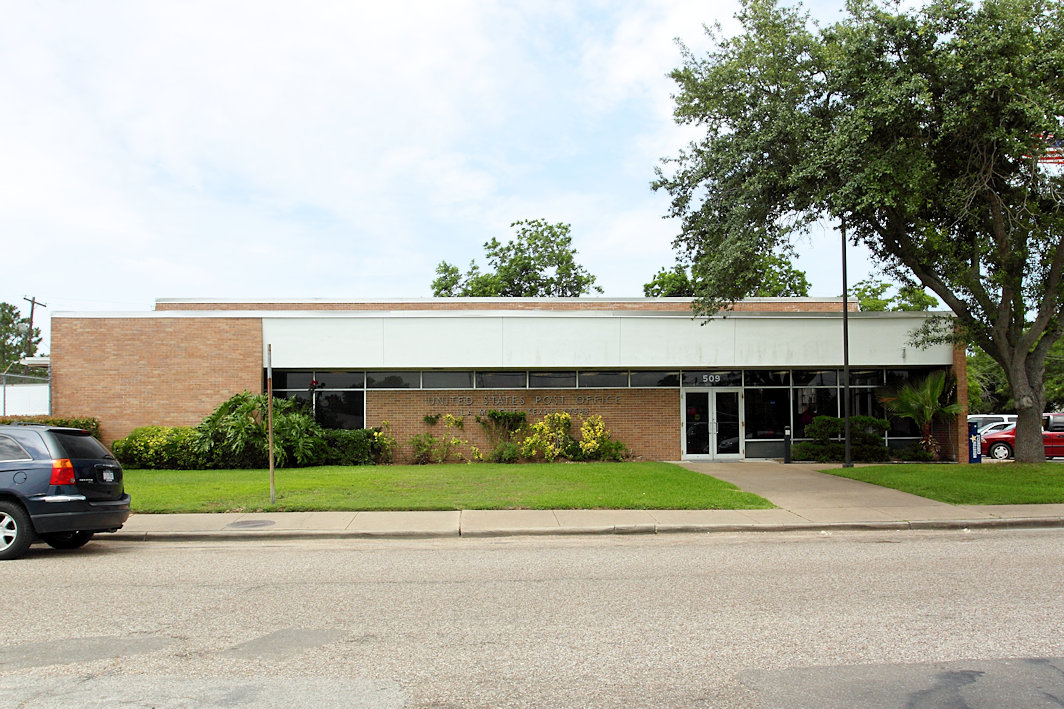
La Marque Post Office – 77658

The United States Postal Service La Marque Post Office is located at 509 Laurel Street.

La Marque operates under a council–manager form of government. In this system, the City Council sets policy and direction for the community, while a City Manager is appointed to oversee day-to-day operations and implement the Council’s policies. Currently, the city is led by Interim City Manager J.B. Pritchett, who was appointed by the City Council to manage municipal operations and ensure that the city’s services run smoothly. His role includes supervising city departments, managing the budget, and acting as the chief executive officer of the city government.

As per a governmental agreement, La Marque receives animal services from the Galveston County Animal Resource Center, an animal shelter operated by the Galveston County Health District in Texas City.

== Education ==
=== Primary and secondary schools ===
==== Public schools ====
Most of the city is served by the Texas City Independent School District (TCISD). Small portions of La Marque are served by the Dickinson Independent School District, Hitchcock Independent School District, and Santa Fe Independent School District. Previously La Marque Independent School District (LMISD) served what became the TCISD area. On December 2, 2015, Texas Education Agency Commissioner Michael Williams announced that TCISD would absorb the former LMISD effective July 1, 2016.

La Marque High School continues to serve the former LMISD area. The respective schools for other parts are Dickinson High School, Hitchcock High School, and Santa Fe High School.

La Marque Independent School District was mismanaged for so long that it was finally dissolved, when it was assigned by the commissioner of education an accreditation status of "Not Accredited-Revoked". By law, a school district that is closed must be annexed into an adjoining district. Accordingly, Texas City, Hitchcock, Dickinson, and Santa Fe school districts jointly absorbed the responsibility of educating La Marque students.

Before shutting down the school district, Commissioner of Education Michael Williams gave the La Marque schools ample opportunity and time for improvement. In 2011, the school district was judged "academically unacceptable". Similarly, in 2013 and 2014, La Marque schools were given a rating of "improvement required". Finally, an October 2015 review by the TEA found La Marque ISD's rating at "substandard achievement". This ultimately led to the revocation of the accreditation status. Critics of the school district point out that administrators failed to manage the tax funds properly, failed to hire and train competent instructors, and emphasized sports to the exclusion of academics.

=== Colleges and universities ===
The former La Marque district (as well as the Texas City district), Dickinson, Santa Fe, and Hitchcock school districts (and therefore all of La Marque) is served by the College of the Mainland.

=== Public libraries ===
The city owns the La Marque Public Library, which is located at 1011 Bayou Road.

== Transportation ==
Greyhound Bus Lines operates the Texas City La Marque Station at McKown Air Conditioning in nearby Texas City.

== Parks and recreation ==
The Galveston County Department of Parks and Senior Services operates the Wayne Johnson III Community Center at Carbide Park.
