= Ben Emanuel =

American gridiron football player (born 1982)

No. 38
- Position: Safety

Personal information
- Born: June 18, 1982 (age 44); Texas City, Texas, U.S.
- Listed height: 6 ft 3 in (1.91 m)
- Listed weight: 216 lb (98 kg)

Career information
- High school: Clear Brook (TX)
- College: UCLA
- NFL draft: 2005: 5th round, 171st overall pick

Career history
- Carolina Panthers (2005)*; San Francisco 49ers (2005); Washington Redskins (2006)*; Cleveland Browns (2006); Calgary Stampeders (2008)*
- * Offseason or practice squad member only
- Stats at Pro Football Reference
- Stats at CFL.ca

Benjamin Franklin Emanuel II (born June 18, 1982) is an American former professional football player who was a safety for the Cleveland Browns of the National Football League (NFL). He played college football for the UCLA Bruins. He attended Clear Brook High School.

== Professional career ==
Pre-draft measurables
| Height | Weight | 40-yard dash | 10-yard split | 20-yard split | 20-yard shuttle | Three-cone drill | Vertical jump | Broad jump | Bench press |
|---|---|---|---|---|---|---|---|---|---|
| 6 ft 2 3/4 in (1.90 m) | 213 lb (97 kg) | 4.65 s | 1.64 s | 2.74 s | 4.52 s | 7.48 s | 36.0 in (0.91 m) | 10 ft 0 in (3.05 m) | 21 reps |
All values from NFL Combine/Pro Day

Emanuel was selected the Carolina Panthers in the fifth round (171st overall) in the 2005 NFL draft. He spent time on the practice roster before being traded to the San Francisco 49ers and dressed for 11 games, starting eight, recording 45 tackles, one sack, one interception, and three pass knockdowns.

He signed with Washington Redskins on August 8, 2006, and was released on August 15, 2006. He signed with the Cleveland Browns on December 12, 2006, but did not play. He was released on June 26, 2007.

On March 11, 2008, Emanuel signed as a free agent with the Calgary Stampeders. He did not play.

== Personal life ==
His cousins, Bert Emanuel, Derrick Johnson, and Dwight Johnson also played in the NFL.

As a trainer, Emanuel specializes in weight management and human performance. He trains top business executives, consults celebrity trainers, creates corporate wellness initiatives, works with USTA affiliates in promoting the advancement of Adaptive Tennis for amputees, and spent two years in the Middle East training high-profile clients. He is a Corrective Exercise Specialist (PES) and holds a Personal Training Certification (CPT) accredited by the National Academy of Sports Medicine (NASM).
