= Davison Group Incorporated =

The Davison Group Incorporated is a for-profit corporation, which is now led by a descendant of Frank B. Davison, one of the founding fathers of Texas City, Texas, and former lieutenant Governor of Puerto Rico, Kenneth D. McClintock.

The corporation, which provides consulting services in public policy and government affairs, was founded in San Juan and McClintock serves as its current CEO.
