= Clear Brook High School =

Public school in Texas, United States

Location
- 4607 F-M 2351; Friendswood postal address, Texas 77546; United States; 29°32′52″N 95°11′13″W

Information
- Type: Public high school
- Motto: "On a Quest for the best"
- Established: 1988
- Principal: Monica Speaks
- Staff: 144.13 (on an FTE basis)
- Enrollment: 2,322 (2023-2024)
- Student to teacher ratio: 16.11
- Colors: Black, red, and silver
- Nickname: Wolverines
- Rival: Friendswood High School and Clear Lake High School
- Website: clearbrook.ccisd.net

Clear Brook High School is a secondary school located in unincorporated Harris County, Texas, with a Friendswood postal address.

The school, which serves grades 9 through 12, had its first graduating class in 1991. The school opened in 1988, and near FM-2351. The school provides education to portions of Friendswood and Clear Lake.

The school's colors are red, black, and silver and the mascot is a wolverine.

== Notable alumni ==
- Stephanie Beatriz — actress
- Jeff Bourns — top 5 world-ranked Amputee Tennis Player
- Ben Emanuel — Calgary Stampeders CFL safety
- Anthony Hill — American football tight end
- Corey Julks — MLB player
- Mark Milton — CFL player
- Ronnie Price — National Basketball Association (NBA) point guard
- Sean Townsend — American artistic gymnast
- Michael Yo — actor, comedian

== Competitive Success ==
Clear Brook High School has garnered success in various competitive events, with most taking place under the University Interscholastic League. Clear Brook is currently categorized as a 6A High School, the highest division in the University Interscholastic League. Below are a list of notable placements:

Gregory Stuart - 2nd place State Informative Extemporaneous Speaking

Darwin Bolden - 7th place State Track and Field: Discus
