= Davison Home =

Coordinates: 29°23′12″N 94°53′44″W

The Davison Home is a Victorian structure built between 1895 and 1897 by Frank B. Davison (1855-1935), a pioneer of Texas City, Texas, and his wife Florence Grace Haven. It is currently operated as a museum by the Texas City Museum with the help of the Texas City Historical Association in the city originally known as Shoal Point.

Built with cypress wood, the structure has survived multiple storms over more than 115 years and was damaged the most during the 1947 Texas City disaster after a chemical explosion.

The structure has been home to several generations of Davison family members. Texas City Mayor Emmett F. Lowry dedicated it as a city landmark in January 1974, according to historical markers on the property, which is now the centerpiece of the Texas City Heritage Park. It housed the first child born in Texas City, and was the first home with telephone service in the early 1900s.

The Davison family includes hundreds of members living mostly in Texas and extending as far away as Puerto Rico, whose past Secretary of State and Lieutenant Governor, Kenneth Davison McClintock, is Frank B. Davison's great-grandson.
