= Anthony Hill (tight end) =

American football player (born 1985)

No. 87, 83
- Position: Tight end

Personal information
- Born: January 2, 1985 (age 41); Friendswood, Texas, U.S.
- Listed height: 6 ft 6 in (1.98 m)
- Listed weight: 278 lb (126 kg)

Career information
- High school: Clear Brook (TX); Hargrave Military Academy (VA)
- College: N.C. State
- NFL draft: 2009: 4th round, 122nd overall pick

Career history
- Houston Texans (2009–2010); Philadelphia Eagles (2011)*; Indianapolis Colts (2011)
- * Offseason or practice squad member only

Awards and highlights
- Second-team All-ACC (2006)

Career NFL statistics
- Receptions: 3
- Receiving yards: 19
- Stats at Pro Football Reference

Anthony Hill (born January 2, 1985) is an American former professional football player who was a tight end in the National Football League (NFL). He played college football for the NC State Wolfpack and was selected by the Houston Texans in the fourth round of the 2009 NFL draft. Hill has also played for the Philadelphia Eagles and Indianapolis Colts.

== Early life ==
Hill attended Clear Brook High School in Friendswood, Texas, and later the Hargrave Military Academy. As a senior, he recorded 10 catches after switching to tight end from defensive end. There, he played with future Wolfpack teammate wide receiver Darrell Blackman. He was rated No. 44 nationally at his position by Rivals.com.

== College career ==
Hill played college football at North Carolina State University. In his sophomore season with the Wolfpack, he caught 45 passes for 478 yards and earned second-team All-ACC honors. In July 2007, he tore his ACL and did not return until fall of 2008. In his senior year, despite missing four games with a chest injury, Hill caught 19 passes and scored four touchdowns.

== Professional career ==
Pre-draft measurables
Height	Weight	Arm length	Hand span	40-yard dash	10-yard split	20-yard split	20-yard shuttle	Three-cone drill	Vertical jump	Broad jump	Bench press
6 ft 5 in (1.96 m)	262 lb (119 kg)	34 3/4 in (0.88 m)	10 1/8 in (0.26 m)	4.84 s	1.72 s	2.80 s	4.56 s	7.31 s	30.5 in (0.77 m)	9 ft 8 in (2.95 m)	21 reps
All values from NFL Combine/Pro Day

=== Houston Texans ===
Hill was selected by the Houston Texans in the fourth round of the 2009 NFL draft. On October 2, 2009, word spread that Hill had contracted the H1N1 virus, also known as Swine flu and had been hospitalized. Head coach Gary Kubiak said publicly that Hill "is doing much better" and that "there's no panic at all".

He was waived on September 3, 2011, during final roster cuts.

=== Philadelphia Eagles ===
Hill was signed to the Philadelphia Eagles' practice squad on September 5, 2011.

=== Indianapolis Colts ===
Hill was signed to the Indianapolis Colts active roster on November 7, 2011, after starter Dallas Clark and backup Brody Eldridge went down with injuries.
