= Dwight Johnson (American football) =

American football player (born 1977)

No. 23
- Position: Defensive end

Personal information
- Born: January 30, 1977 (age 49); Waco, Texas, U.S.
- Listed height: 6 ft 4 in (1.93 m)
- Listed weight: 285 lb (129 kg)

Career information
- High school: Waco
- College: Baylor

Career history
- 2000: Philadelphia Eagles
- 2001: Frankfurt Galaxy
- 2001-2002: New York Giants
- 2003: San Francisco 49ers*
- 2004: New England Patriots*
- * Offseason or practice squad member only
- Stats at Pro Football Reference

Dwight O'Neal Johnson (born January 30, 1977) is an American former professional football player who was a defensive end in the National Football League (NFL) for the Philadelphia Eagles and the New York Giants. He played college football for the Baylor Bears. He also played for the New England Patriots and was cut after the 2004-2005 season after they beat the Philadelphia Eagles in Super Bowl 39. He now owns and lives in McDonough, Georgia at a Speed, Agility and Strength facility named Total Athlete.

Pre-draft measurables
Height	Weight	Arm length	Hand span	40-yard dash	10-yard split	20-yard split	20-yard shuttle	Three-cone drill	Vertical jump	Broad jump	Bench press
6 ft 4 in (1.93 m)	285 lb (129 kg)	33 in (0.84 m)	9 1/4 in (0.23 m)	4.96 s	1.70 s	2.87 s	4.76 s	7.51 s	28.0 in (0.71 m)	8 ft 9 in (2.67 m)	26 reps
All values from NFL Combine

== Personal life ==
His mother Beverly Johnson lives in Waco, TX as well as his sister Daphanie Latchison. His older brother Dwayne Johnson lives in Houston, TX.

His younger brother, Derrick Johnson, played for the Kansas City Chiefs. His cousins, Bert Emanuel and Ben Emanuel also played for the NFL.
