= Frank B. Davison =

Frank Burt Davison (1855–1935) is considered one of the founding fathers of Texas City, Texas, its first postmaster and grocer.

== Professional life ==
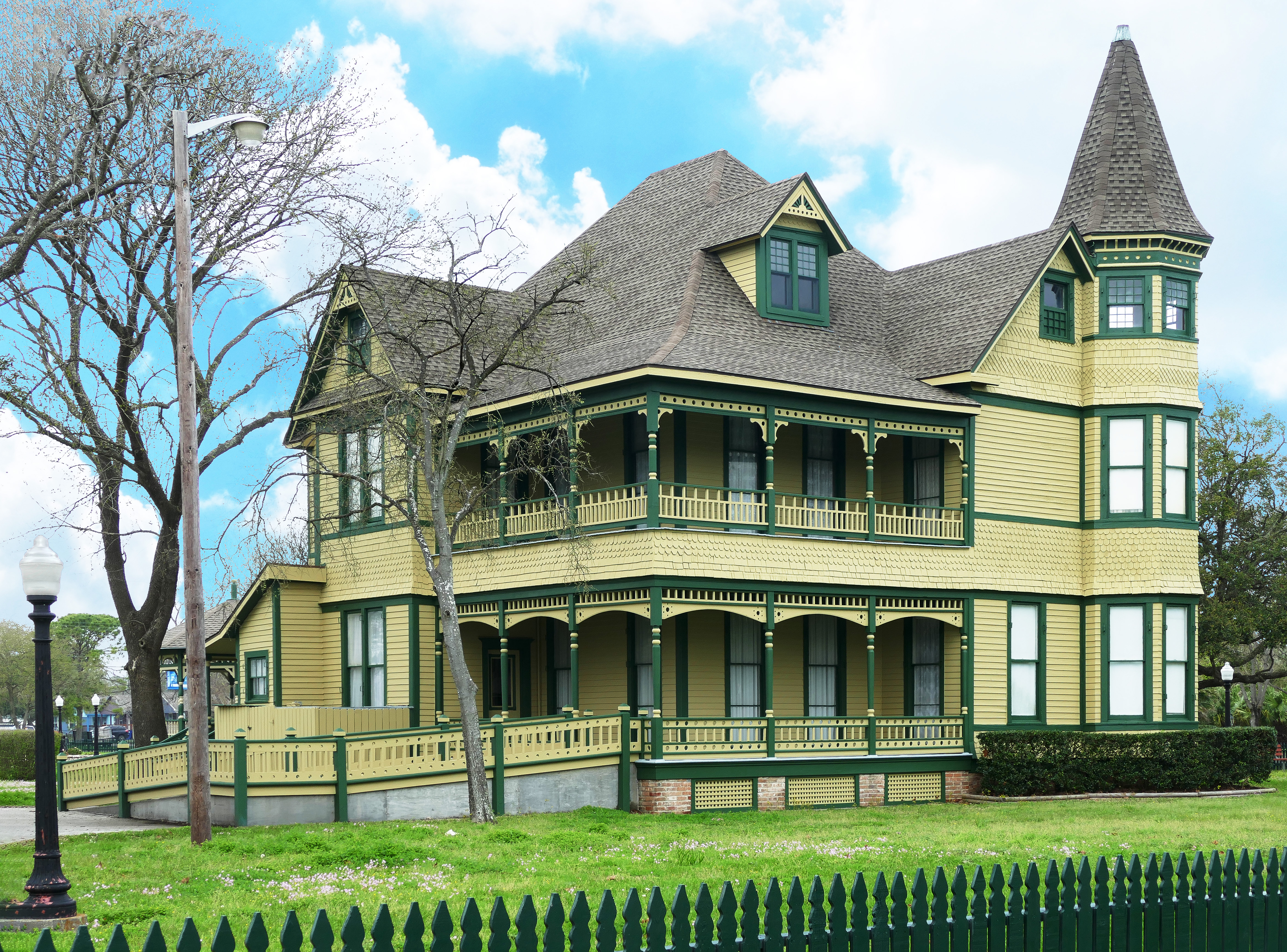
Frank B. Davison House in Texas City, Texas

Transferred from Michigan in 1891 as resident manager of the Texas City Improvement Company, he moved to a location within what would be the city in 1892. He established its first Post Office in 1893, opened its first general store, and became a director of its first bank, the Texas City State Bank. He also founded a real estate firm, Davison and Smith.

== Civic participation ==
In 1911, the 1,500-plus residents of Texas City decided to incorporate and form a municipal government. On September 16, 1911, Davison and H. M. Coats became the town's first two commissioners, while W. P. Tarpey was elected as the first mayor. Davison subsequently served on its school board.

== The Davison Family ==
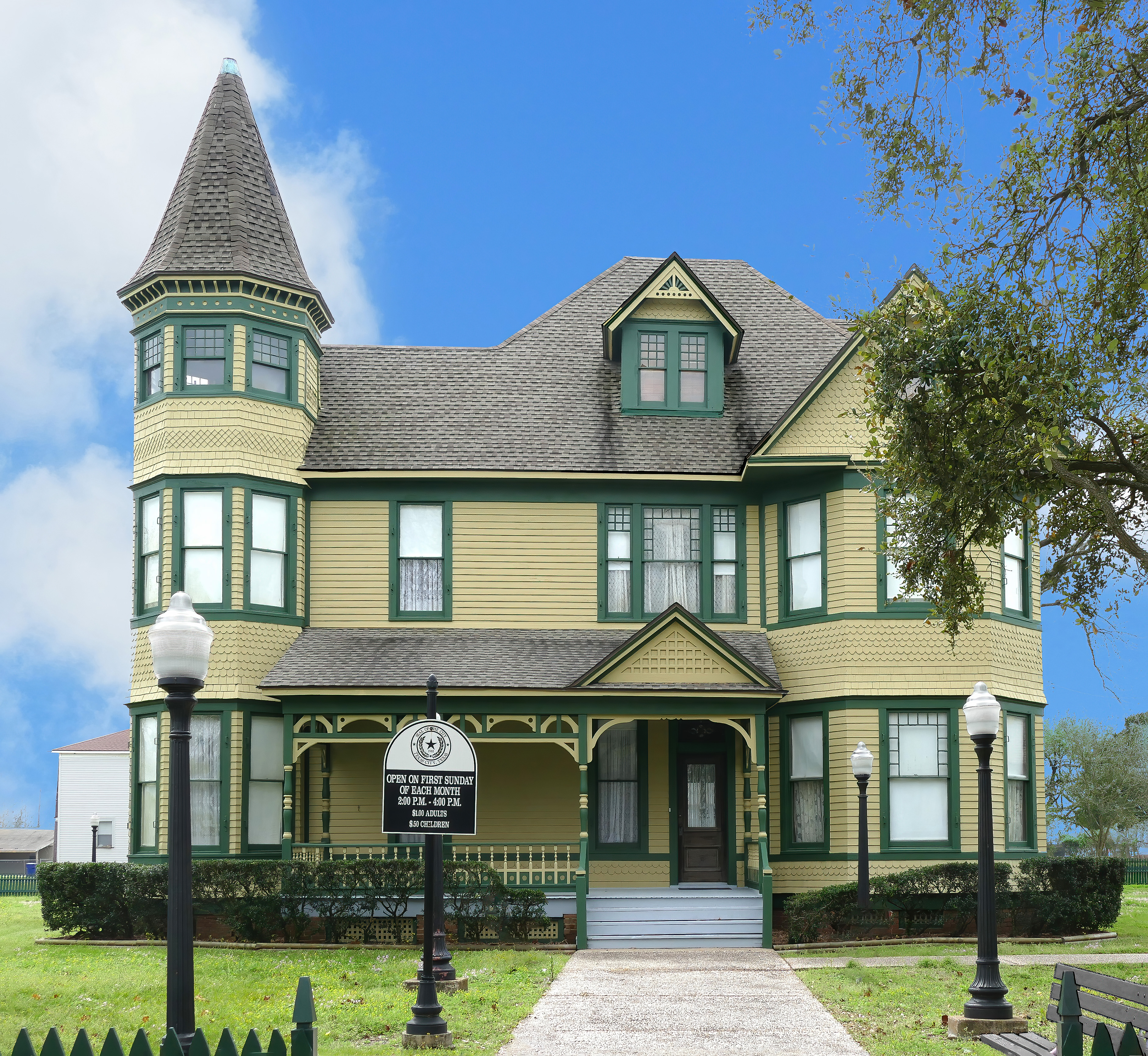
Tours on first Sunday of month

Frank Davison, married to Florence Grace Davison, with whom he had five children, died at the age of 80 in Texas City, in 1935. Due to his prominence within the city he co-founded, Mayor Emmett Lowry declared a one-hour business moratorium in Davison's honor when he died.

His great-grandson, Kenneth Davison McClintock, following in his political footsteps, served as the 22nd Secretary of State and lieutenant governor of Puerto Rico. seventy-nine years after his great-grandfather's first election in 1911, McClintock began a 22-year stint as a city councilman, state senator, Senate President, Secretary of State and Lieutenant Governor of Puerto Rico. McClintock is now the CEO of the Davison Group Incorporated in San Juan

In December, 1933, Mrs. Florence Davison hosted at her home the first meeting of the Texas City Garden Club, an organization that continues to exist 79 years later, collaborating with Habitat for Humanity. The Davison family home, the first one with telephone service in Texas City, a turreted Victorian structure, has been restored and is now the centerpiece of Texas City's Heritage Park.

== Sources ==
- McClintock, George Davison (Ed.). (1990). The Davison Book. San Juan, Puerto Rico.
- A Pictorial History Texas City Explosion 1947, 50th Anniversary Commemorative Edition, City of Texas City, 1997, p. 5
