= USA TAP OPEN =

Adaptive Standing Tennis tournament

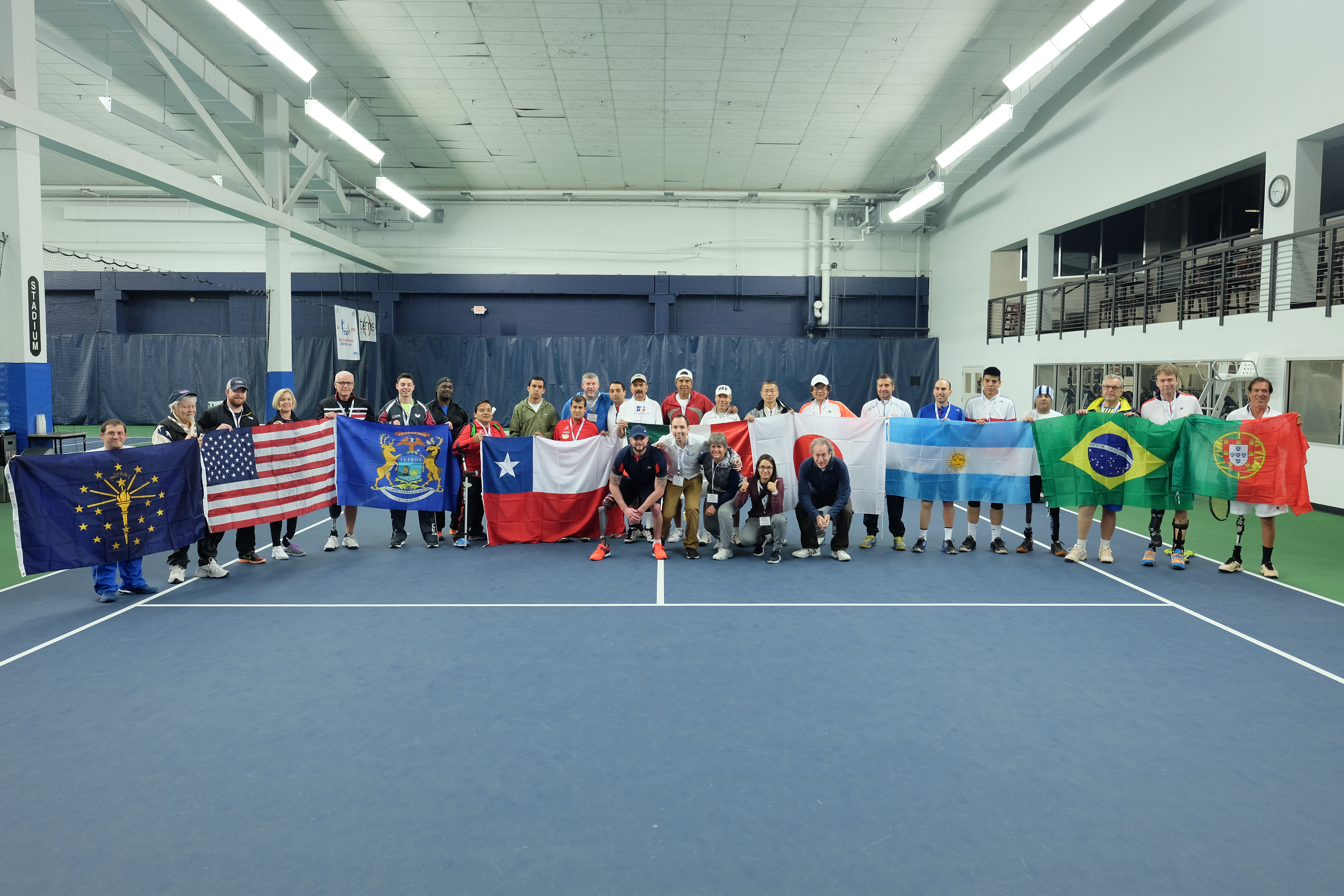
The Inaugural USA TAP OPEN was the first International Adaptive Standing Tennis Tournament in the United States taking place December 9–11, 2016 in Houston, Texas. 28 competitors from 11 countries participated in the World Championship.

USA TAP OPEN was the first International Adaptive Standing Tennis tournament to take place in the United States in American history.

The inaugural tournament was held in Houston, Texas in 2016 and organized by Cindy Benzon, Jeff Bourns, Harold Graham, Enzo Amadei Jerez, and Ana Maria Rodriguez with support from the United States Tennis Association of Texas, the Houston Tennis Association, Tennis Express, and Houston's Memorial Hermann Hospital. 28 players from 11 different countries came to participate in the inaugural tournament. 1987 International Tennis Hall of Fame inductee Dennis Ralston served as tournament ambassador. The tournament served as the adaptive standing tennis world championships from 2016 to 2019 before being interrupted by the COVID-19 pandemic.

The USA TAP OPEN is part of an international tennis circuit, the TAP World Tour. The TAP World Tour was the first International circuit for professional standing adaptive tennis players. The tour was founded by Enzo Amadei and Ana Maria Rodriguez of Santiago, Chile. The United States, South America, Europe, Asia, Africa, and the Dominican Republic all have players who have competed on the tour.

The USA TAP Open helped cultivate and grow adaptive standing tennis programing and more organized tournaments in the United States and across the world.

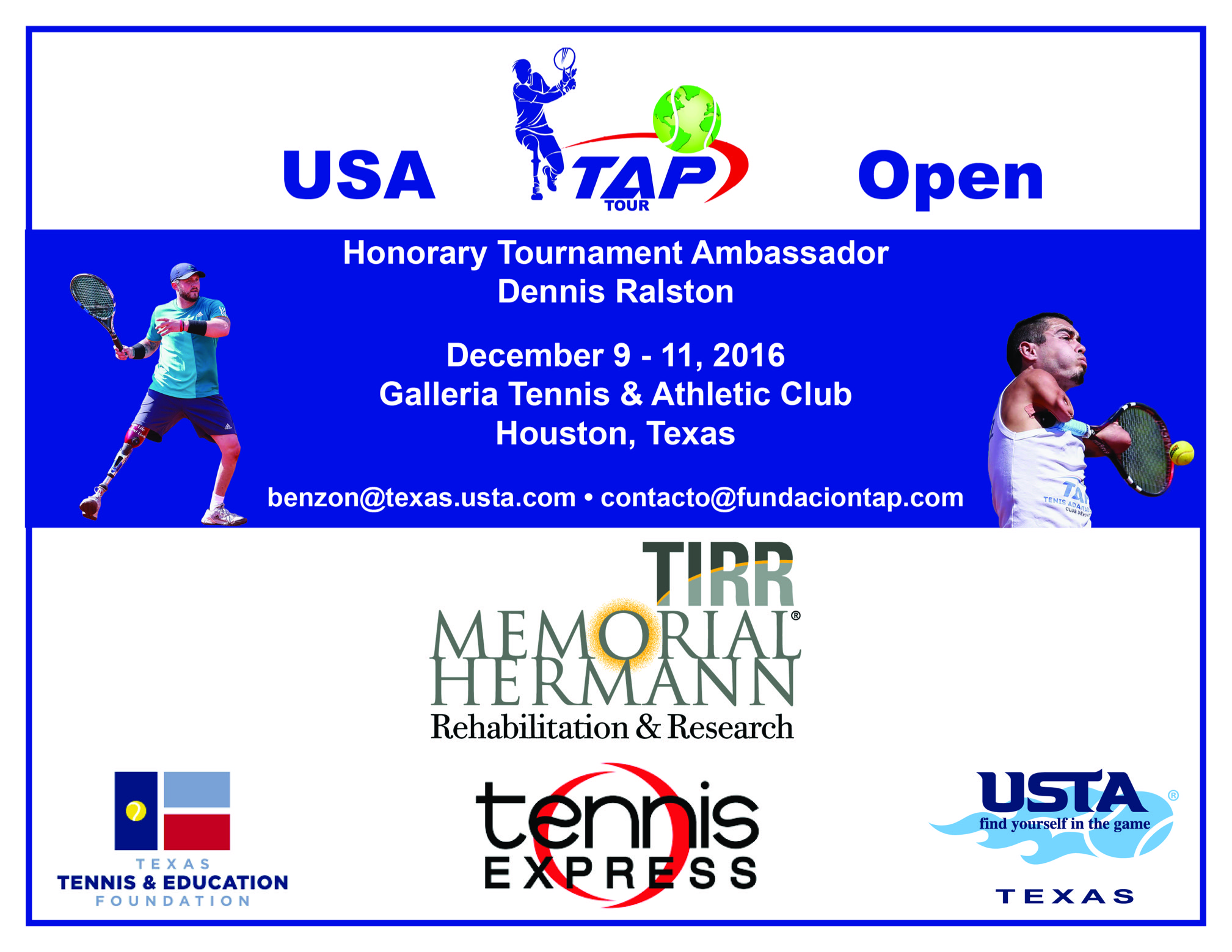
Inaugural 2016 USA TAP OPEN Adaptive Standing Tennis World Championships
