= Mark Milton (gridiron football) =

American gridiron football player (born 1996)

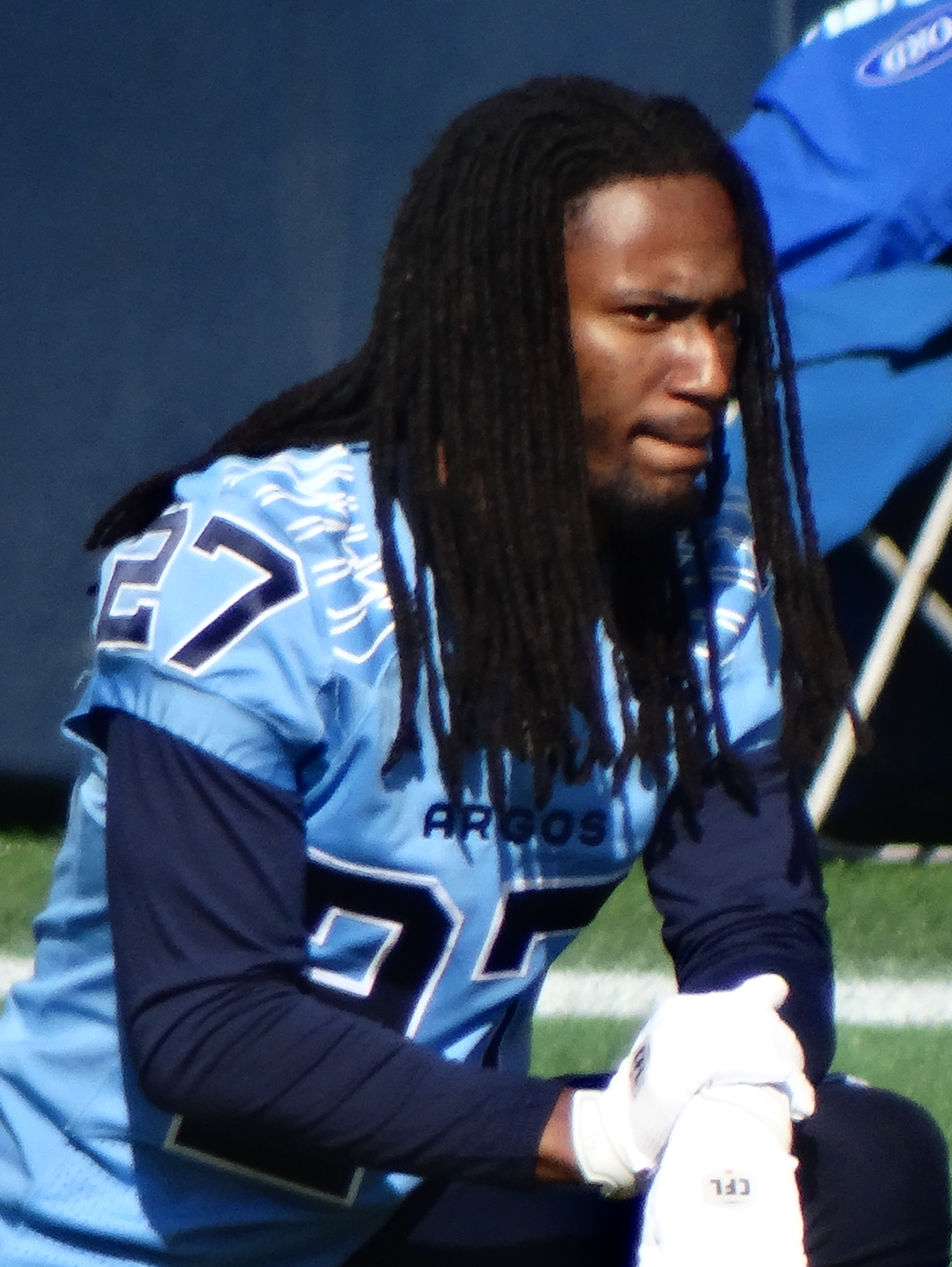
- Milton with the Toronto Argonauts in 2024

Profile
- Position: Defensive back

Personal information
- Born: September 14, 1999 (age 27); Houston, Texas, U.S.
- Listed height: 6 ft 1 in (1.85 m)
- Listed weight: 185 lb (84 kg)

Career information
- High school: Clear Brook High
- College: Baylor (2018–2022)

Career history
- 2023: Carolina Panthers*
- 2023: Miami Dolphins*
- 2023: Carolina Panthers*
- 2023: Birmingham Stallions*
- 2023: San Antonio Brahmas*
- 2024: Hamilton Tiger-Cats
- 2024–2025: Toronto Argonauts
- 2025: Ottawa Redblacks
- * Offseason or practice squad member only

Awards and highlights
- Grey Cup champion (2024)
- Stats at CFL.ca

Mark Milton (born September 14, 1999) is an American former professional football defensive back.

== College career ==
Milton first played college football for the Baylor Bears from 2018 to 2022. He played in 51 games where he recorded 97 tackles, one interception, one forced fumble, and one fumble recovery.

== Professional career ==
Pre-draft measurables
Height	Weight	Arm length	Hand span	40-yard dash	10-yard split	20-yard split	20-yard shuttle	Three-cone drill	Vertical jump	Broad jump	Bench press
6 ft 1 in (1.85 m)	186 lb (84 kg)	31 1/2 in (0.80 m)	8 1/8 in (0.21 m)	4.47 s	1.49 s	2.62 s	4.40 s	7.45 s	35 in (0.89 m)	10 ft 0 in (3.05 m)	12 reps
All values from Pro Day

=== Carolina Panthers (first stint) ===
Milton signed with the Carolina Panthers as an undrafted free agent on April 30, 2023. He played in all three preseason games and was named to the practice squad on August 30, 2023. He was released from the practice squad on September 20, 2023.

=== Miami Dolphins ===
On October 3, 2023, Milton was signed by the Miami Dolphins to a practice squad agreement. He did not dress in a game and was released on October 30, 2023.

=== Carolina Panthers (second stint) ===
Milton re-signed with the Panthers to their practice squad on November 2, 2023. Milton was released again on November 10, 2023.

=== Birmingham Stallions ===
Milton signed with the Birmingham Stallions on December 6, 2023. However, he was released during training camp on March 10, 2024.

=== San Antonio Brahmas ===
On March 19, 2024, Milton signed with the San Antonio Brahmas. He was released shortly after, along with the final training camp cuts, on March 22, 2024.

=== Hamilton Tiger-Cats ===
On May 8, 2024, Milton signed with the Hamilton Tiger-Cats. Following training camp, he was initially placed on the practice roster, but was called up immediately for the team's season opening game. Milton made his professional debut on June 7, 2024, starting at weakside cornerback against the Calgary Stampeders, where he recorded three defensive tackles. He was moved back to the practice roster following this game and was then outright released on June 19, 2024.

=== Toronto Argonauts ===
Milton signed with the Toronto Argonauts to a practice roster agreement on July 1, 2024. He first dressed in a game for the Argonauts on July 27, 2024, against the Winnipeg Blue Bombers, where he had one defensive tackle and two special teams tackles. In the 2024 season, Milton played in 10 regular season games, starting in seven, where he recorded 24 defensive tackles, seven special teams tackles, three pass knockdowns, one sack, and two forced fumbles. He started in all three post-season games, including the 111th Grey Cup where he had one defensive tackle in the Argonauts' 41–24 victory over the Winnipeg Blue Bombers. He played in nine games for the Argonauts in 2025, where he had 23 defensive tackles and one special teams tackle.

=== Ottawa Redblacks ===
On August 25, 2025, it was announced that Milton had been traded to the Ottawa Redblacks for a seventh-round pick in the 2026 CFL draft.

=== Retirement ===
On April 22, 2026, Milton retired from professional football.
