= Texas City, Texas =

- City
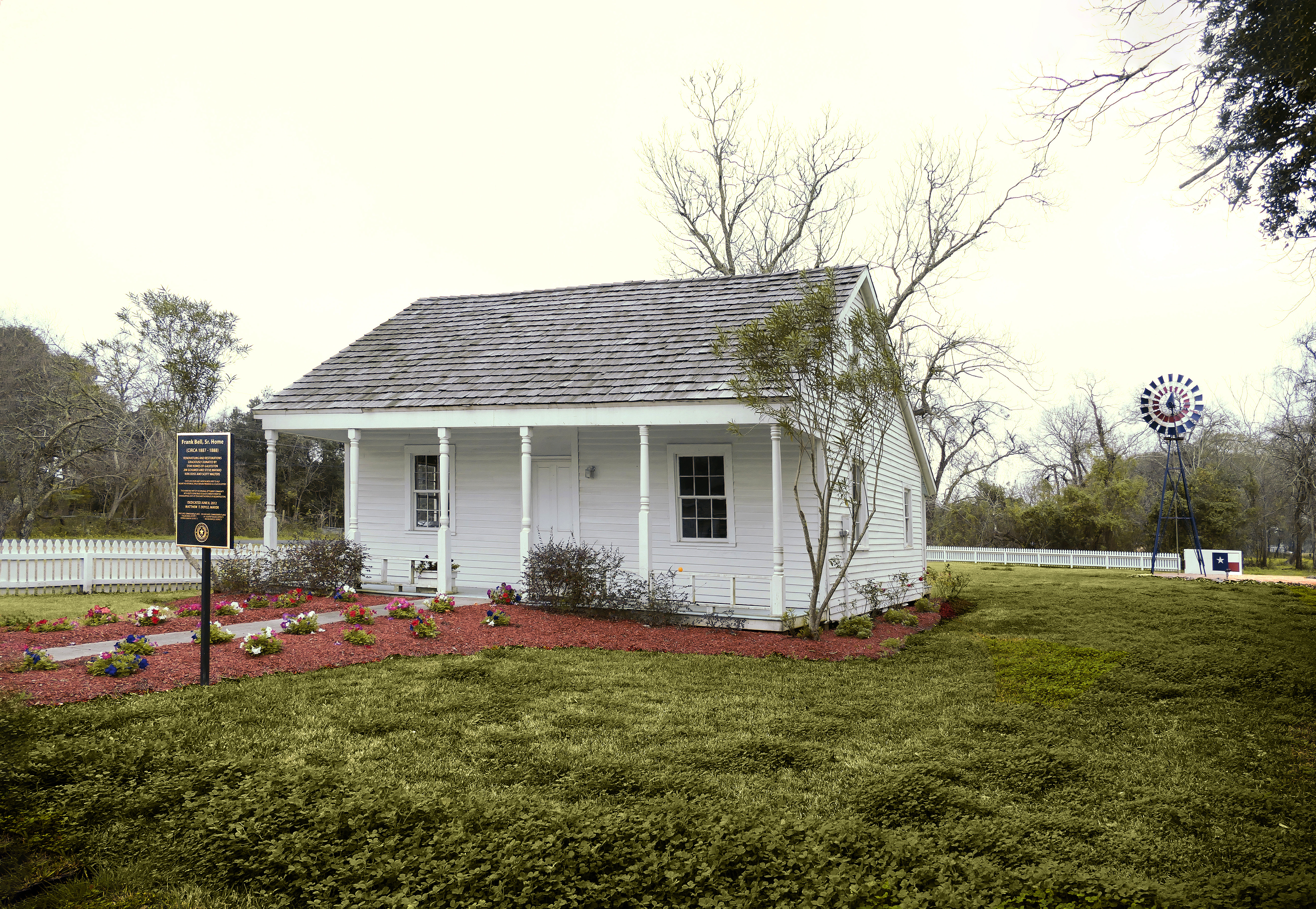
- The 1867 Settlement Historic District
- Motto: The city that would not die
- Interactive map of Texas City, Texas
- Location within Texas
- Coordinates: 29.4249°N 94.8900°W
- Country: United States
- State: Texas
- Counties: Galveston, Chambers
- Founded: 1830s
- Incorporated: September 16, 1911

Government
  - Type: City Commission
  - Mayor: Abel Garza, Jr.
  - At Large: Wade Johnson; Brian Goetschius
  - Commissions: District 1: DeAndre' Knoxson; District 2: Barbie Tucker; District 3: Chris Sharp; District 4: Jason Delgado

Area
  - City: 186.578 sq mi (483.235 km^{2})
  - Land: 66.265 sq mi (171.625 km^{2})
  - Water: 120.313 sq mi (311.608 km^{2}) 64.48%
- Elevation: 9.8 ft (3 m)

Population (2020)
  - City: 51,898
  - Estimate (2025): 59,733
  - Rank: U.S.: 683rd TX: 68th
  - Density: 783.19/sq mi (302.39/km^{2})
  - Urban: 191,863 (U.S.: 200th)
  - Metro: 7,904,627 (U.S.: 5th)
  - Combined: 8,105,280 (U.S.: 8th)
- Time zone: UTC–6 (Central (CST))
  - Summer (DST): UTC–5 (CDT)
- ZIP Codes: 77510, 77539, 77568, 77590, 77591, 77592
- Area code: 409
- FIPS code: 48-72392
- GNIS feature ID: 2412055
- Website: texascitytx.gov

Texas City is a city in Galveston County, Texas and a suburb of the city of Galveston (with some water area in Chambers County), United States. Located on the southwest shoreline of Galveston Bay, Texas City is a deepwater port on the Gulf Coast and a petroleum refining and petrochemical manufacturing center. The population was 51,898 as of the 2020 census, and was estimated at 59,733 in 2025, making it the second-largest city in Galveston County, after League City. It is part of the Houston-Galveston metropolitan area. Texas City was the site of a major explosion in 1947 that demolished much of the city and its port.

== History ==
Three duck hunters in 1891 noted that a location along Galveston Bay, known locally as Shoal Point, had the potential to become a major port. Shoal Point had existed since the 1830s, when veterans of the Texas Revolution (1835–1836) were awarded land for their services. The name was applied to the community when a post office opened in 1878. The duck hunters were Benjamin, Henry, and Jacob Myers, three brothers from Duluth, Minnesota. After they returned to Duluth, they formed the Myers Brothers syndicate and convinced other investors to put up money to buy 10,000 acres (4,000 hectares) of Galveston Bay frontage, including Shoal Point. They renamed the area Texas City.

=== Founding ===
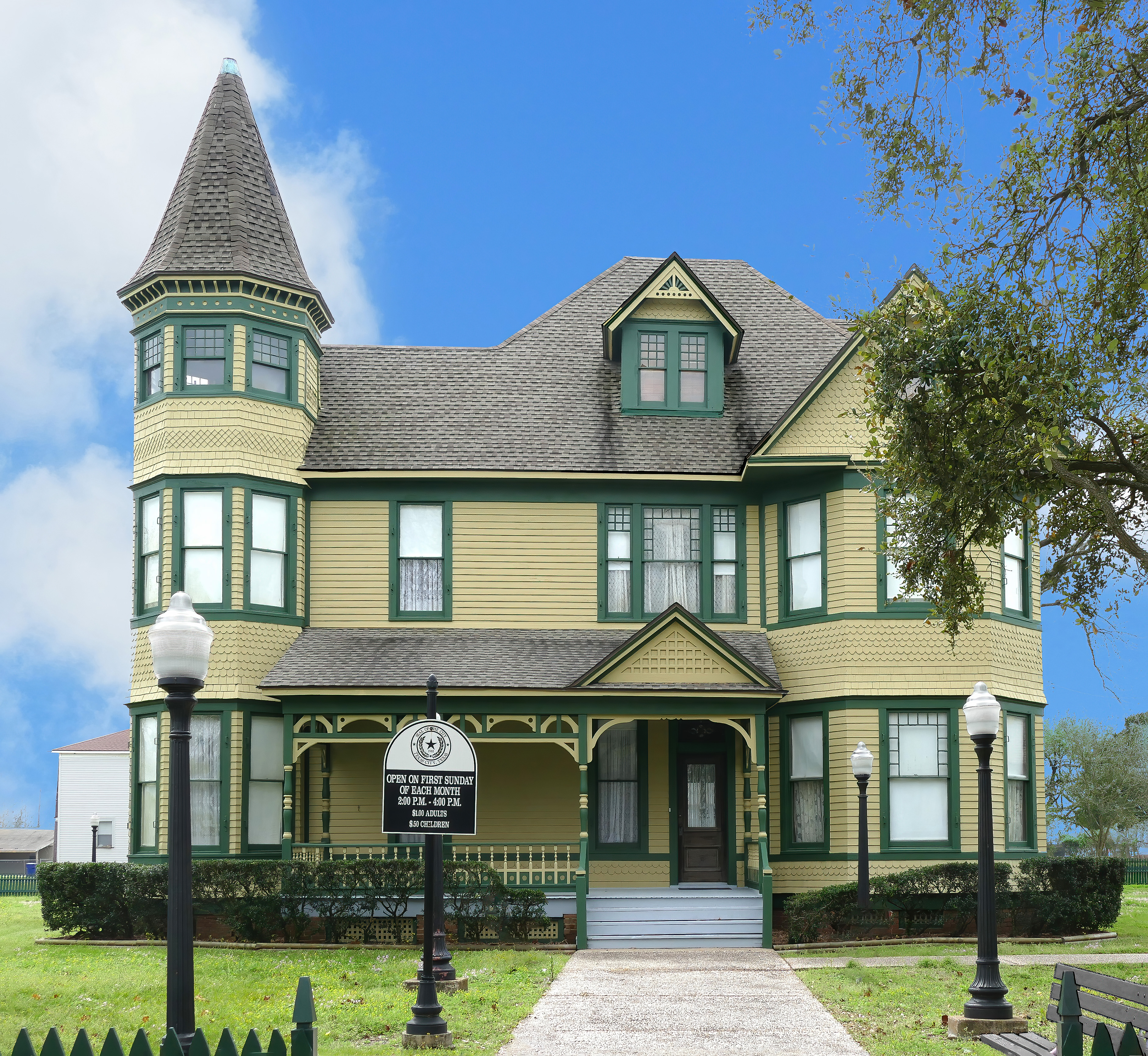
Frank B. Davison House

By 1893, the investors had formed the Texas City Improvement Company (TCIC), which plotted and filed the townsite plan. A post office opened in 1893 with Frank B. Davison as the town's first postmaster, to serve about 250 people who had moved there from Minnesota and Michigan. TCIC also received the federal government's permission to dredge an eight-foot channel in the bay from Bolivar Roads (at the east end of Galveston Island) to serve Texas City. In 1894, the channel was first used commercially. TCIC eventually dredged the channel to a 40-foot depth and extended the length of the port to 1.5 mi. TCIC also built a four-mile railroad to the Texas City Junction south of town, where it connected to two other rail lines: Galveston, Houston and San Antonio and Galveston-Houston and Henderson.

Despite these successes, the TCIC went bankrupt in 1897. Its assets were reorganized and then split into two new companies: Texas City Company (TCC) and Texas City Railway Terminal Company (TCRTC). TCC acquired 3,000 city lots and provided water, natural gas, and electricity to the town. TCRTC operated the railroad. These companies were chartered on February 4, 1899.

A grid of streets and avenues was laid out during the 1890s, and houses and other structures began to appear. The Davison Home, where the first childbirth in the town took place, was constructed between 1895 and 1897. As the TCIC, TCC, and TCRTC grew, urbanization expanded.

Permission was granted in 1900 to dredge the Texas City channel to a depth of 25 feet. The disastrous Galveston Hurricane of 1900 interrupted the project, washing the dredge ashore, but the Texas City port remained open after the storm passed. Even before the dredging was complete, the first ocean-going ship, SS Piqua, arrived at the port from Mexico on September 28, 1904. Dredging was completed on March 19, 1905, when the U.S. government opened a customs house in Texas City. Port growth progressed rapidly from 12 ships in 1904 to 239 in 1910.

TCRC was chartered in 1908 to build a refinery next to the port facility. For several years, it was the only Texas refinery capable of producing the byproducts wax and lubricating oil. It was later acquired and expanded by Texas oilman Sid Richardson. Three more refineries followed, making Texas City a major port for deepwater shipping of Texas petroleum products to the Atlantic Coast.

Texas City incorporated in 1911 with a mayor and commission form of government. It held its first mayoral election on September 16, which William P. Tarpey won.

The 2nd Division of the United States Army deployed to Texas City in 1913 to guard the Gulf Coast from incursions during the Mexican Revolution, essentially encamping nearly half the nation's land military personnel there due to the perceived double threat that the Mexican Revolution might spill over across the border or that Mexico might become a German ally in the incipient World War.

The military deployment also included the 1st Aero Division, and the Wright brothers trained over a dozen soldiers as military pilots, essentially turning Texas City into the birthplace of what became the United States Air Force, as the city claims at its monument of the birthplace of the Air Force at Bay Street City Park. Speed and distance records were set by pilots trained and planes flying out of Texas City's impromptu military air base.

An August 1915 hurricane completely demolished the encampment. Nine soldiers were killed. Military leaders promptly moved the camp to San Antonio.

In 1921, the TCRTC took over operations of the port facilities. Hugh B. Moore was named president of the company and began an ambitious program of expansions. He was credited with attracting a sugar refinery, a fig processing plant, a gasoline cracking plant, and a grain elevator. More warehouses and tank farms were built to support this growth. By 1925, Texas City had a population of about 3,500 and was a thriving community with two refineries producing gasoline, the Texas City Sugar Refinery, two cotton compressing facilities, and passenger bus service.

The Great Depression and competition caused the sugar refinery to fail in 1930. Economic hard times afflicted the city for a few years until the oil business returned to expansion. Republic Oil Refinery opened a gasoline refinery in 1931. In 1934, Pan American Refinery (a subsidiary of Standard Oil Company of Indiana) began operating. Moore was able to win this refinery from the Houston Ship Channel because of Texas City's location nearer the Gulf of Mexico. By the end of the 1930s, Texas City's population had grown to 5,200.

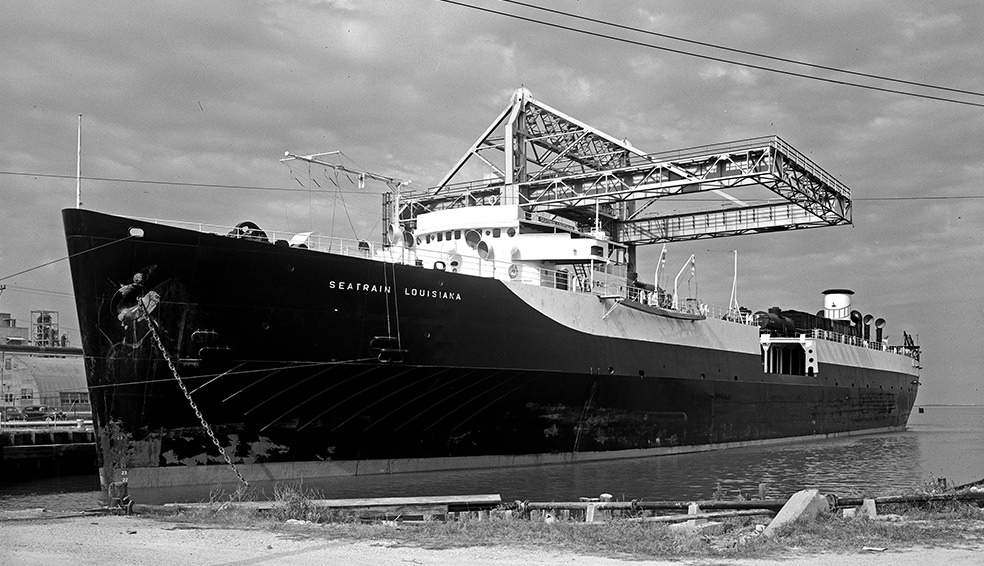
Seatrain Louisiana at Refinery Dock, Texas City 1952

Seatrain Lines constructed a terminal at the Texas City port during 1939–1940. This was a specialized company that owned ships designed to carry railroad cars from Texas City to New York City on a weekly schedule. By 1940, Texas City was the fourth-ranked Texas port, exceeded only by Houston, Beaumont, and Port Arthur.

=== Texas City Dike ===
Texas City is home to the Texas City Dike, a man-made breakwater built of tumbled granite blocks in the 1930s to protect the lower Houston Ship Channel from silting. The dike, famous among locals as "the world's longest man-made fishing pier", extends roughly 5.2 mi (8 km) southeast into Galveston Bay.

=== World War II impact ===
Prosperity and industrial expansion returned as the United States became more involved in World War II. Enemy submarines had almost completely stopped the shipment of petroleum products to friendly countries from the Middle East, South America, and Southeast Asia. Texas City refineries and chemical plants worked around the clock at full capacity to supply the war effort. Realizing that all the world's tin smelters could no longer supply the U.S. demand, Defense Plant Corporation head Jesse H. Jones built the Texas City tin smelter. The government also funded construction of a petrochemical plant to make styrene monomer, a vital raw material for synthetic rubber. Monsanto Chemical Company contracted to operate the facility, which became the nucleus of an even larger petrochemical complex after the war. By 1950, the local population had reached 16,620.

=== 1947 Texas City disaster ===
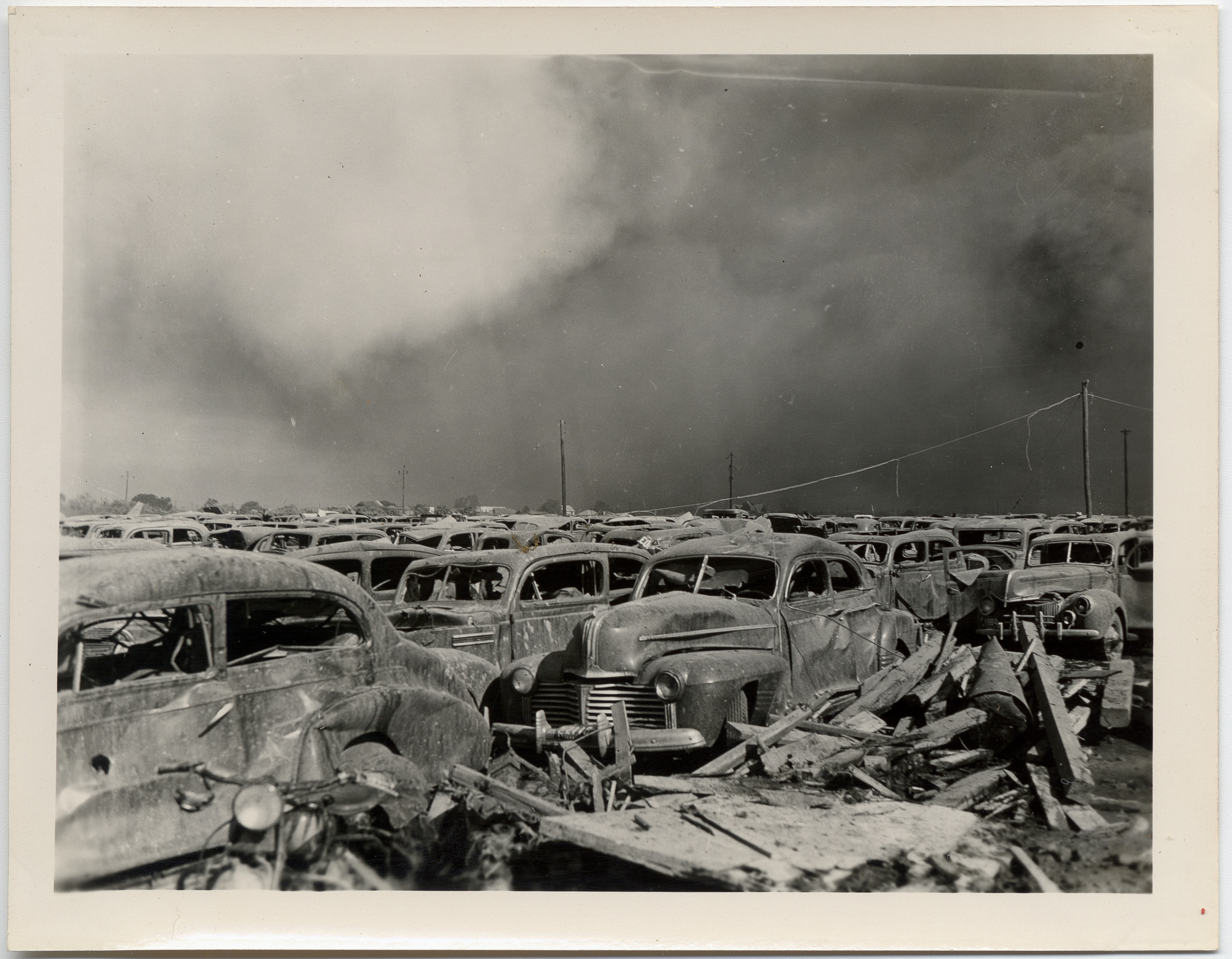
Parking lot 1/4 mi (400 m) from the explosion

The postwar prosperity was interrupted on April 16, 1947, when the French ship Grandcamp, containing ammonium nitrate fertilizer, exploded, initiating what is generally regarded as the worst industrial accident in U.S. history, the Texas City disaster. The fertilizer manufactured in Nebraska and Iowa was already overheating when stored at the Texas City docks. The blast devastated the Monsanto plant and offices immediately across the slip from the Grandcamp, blew away the warehouses, showered shrapnel from the ship in all directions, and ignited a second ship, the S.S.High Flyer, docked at an adjacent slip. Released from its mooring by the blast, the High Flyer rammed a third ship, SS Wilson B. Keene, docked across the slip. Both ships also carried ammonium nitrate fertilizer and were ablaze. They, too, exploded. In all, the explosions killed 581 and injured over 5,000 people. The explosions were so powerful and intense that many of the bodies of the emergency workers who responded to the initial explosion were never accounted for. The entire Texas City and Port Terminal Fire departments were wiped out.

The steel-reinforced concrete grain elevator was pockmarked with shrapnel and the drive shaft of the Grandcamp was embedded in the headhouse. The ship's anchor was hurled several miles away, where it was discovered embedded in the ground at the PanAmerican refinery. Schoolchildren and townspeople who were attracted to the smoke also died, and entire blocks of homes near the port were destroyed. People in Galveston 14 miles (23 km) away were knocked to their knees. Surrounding chemical and oil tanks and refineries were ignited by the blast. At least 63 who died and were not able to be identified are memorialized in a cemetery in the north part of town. The Texas City disaster is widely regarded as the foundation of disaster planning in the United States. Monsanto and other plants committed to rebuilding, and the city recovered quite well. Numerous petrochemical refineries are still in the same port area of Texas City. The city has called itself "the town that would not die," a moniker whose aptness was tested again in the days surrounding Hurricane Ike's assault on the region early on September 13, 2008.

=== 1987 Marathon Oil refinery hydrogen fluoride gas release ===
On October 30, 1987, a crane at the Marathon Oil refinery accidentally dropped its load on a tank of liquid hydrogen fluoride, causing the release of 36,000 pounds (16,000 kg) of hydrogen fluoride gas and requiring 3,000 residents to be evacuated.

=== 2005 BP explosion ===
On March 23, 2005, the city suffered another explosion in a local BP (formerly Amoco) oil refinery, which killed 15 and injured 180. The U.S. Chemical Safety and Hazard Investigation Board (CSB)'s final report on the accident, published in March 2007, called the event "one of the worst industrial disasters in recent U.S. history." The BP facility in Texas City is the United States' third-largest oil refinery, employing over 2,000 people, processing 460,000 barrels (73,000 m^{3}) of crude oil each day, and producing roughly 4% of the country's gasoline.

=== 2008 Hurricane Ike ===
Amid widespread destruction throughout Galveston County caused by the wind and surge associated with Ike, Texas City was largely spared the devastation other low-lying areas suffered. Texas City is mostly surrounded by a 17-mile-long (27 km) levee system built in the early 1960s after the devastating floods from Hurricane Carla in 1961. Together with pump stations containing several Archimedes' screws at various places on the northeast periphery of the city adjoining Galveston, Dollar Bay, and Moses Lake, the levee and pump station system may have saved the city from wholesale devastation by Ike's powerful tidal surge. Damage in the city was largely limited to that caused by Ike's winds and heavy rains.

Beginning September 14, 2008, the day after landfall, Texas City's high-school football complex, Stingaree Stadium, was used as a staging and relocation area for people evacuated by National Guard Black Hawk helicopters from nearby bayfront communities such as the Bolivar Peninsula and Galveston Island. By the morning of September 15, the American Red Cross had opened a relief and material distribution center in the city.

The Texas City Dike was overtopped by a greater than 12-foot (3.7 m) storm surge when Hurricane Ike barreled through the region in the early-morning hours of September 13. Although all buildings, piers, and the Dike Road were destroyed, the dike itself weathered the storm. The dike was closed for three years while the road and supporting facilities were rebuilt. It reopened to traffic in September 2011.

== Geography ==
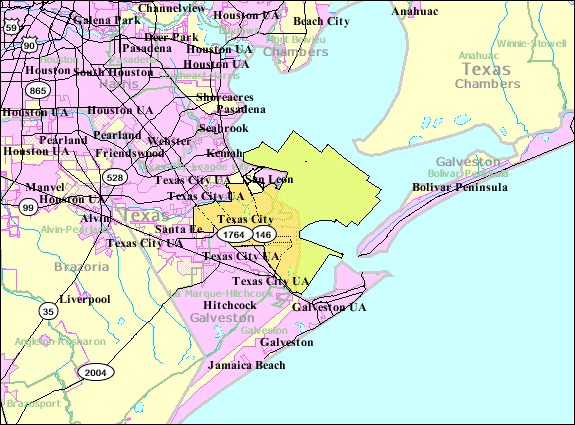
Map of Texas City

Texas City is 10 miles (16 km) northwest of Galveston and 37 miles (60 km) southeast of Houston.

According to the United States Census Bureau, the city has an area of 186.578 square miles (483.23 km^{2}), of which 66.265 square miles (171.63 km^{2}) is land and 120.313 square miles (311.61 km^{2}) (64.48%) is water.

Officially, the elevation of Texas City is 10 feet above mean sea level, though some areas are lower. It was naturally vulnerable to flooding by hurricane storm surges and heavy rainstorms. The land south and west of the city is flat coastal plain. A large part of this area to the south is marshland. Texas City is bounded on the north by Moses Lake, which is fed by Moses Bayou, a freshwater stream. The lake drains into Galveston Bay, which bounds the city on the east.

== Demographics ==
Historical population
Census	Pop.	Note	%±
1920	2,509		—
1930	3,534		40.9%
1940	5,748		62.6%
1950	16,620		189.1%
1960	32,065		92.9%
1970	38,908		21.3%
1980	41,201		5.9%
1990	40,822		−0.9%
2000	41,521		1.7%
2010	45,099		8.6%
2020	51,898		15.1%
2025 (est.)	59,733		15.1%
U.S. Decennial Census; 2020 Census

According to realtor website Zillow, the average price of a home as of August 31, 2026, in Texas City was $227,222.

As of the 2024 American Community Survey, there were 21,845 estimated households in Texas City with an average of 2.49 persons per household. The city has a median household income of $68,776. Approximately 16.2% of the city's population lives at or below the poverty line. Texas City has an estimated 58.0% employment rate, with 20.0% of the population holding a bachelor's degree or higher and 86.3% holding a high school diploma. There were 23,618 housing units at an average density of 356.42 per square mile (137.61/km^{2}).

The top five reported languages (people were allowed to report up to two languages, thus the figures will generally add to more than 100%) were English (78.7%), Spanish (19.2%), Indo-European (1.2%), Asian and Pacific Islander (0.7%), and Other (0.2%).

The median age in the city was 36.6 years.

Texas City, Texas – racial and ethnic composition Note: the US Census treats Hispanic/Latino as an ethnic category. This table excludes Latinos from the racial categories and assigns them to a separate category. Hispanics/Latinos may be of any race.
Race / ethnicity (NH = non-Hispanic)	Pop. 1980	Pop. 1990	Pop. 2000	Pop. 2010	Pop. 2020
White alone (NH)	26,176 (63.53%)	23,574 (57.75%)	20,804 (50.10%)	18,509 (41.04%)	18,822 (36.27%)
Black or African American alone (NH)	9,459 (22.96%)	10,126 (24.81%)	11,268 (27.14%)	13,166 (29.19%)	14,189 (27.34%)
Native American or Alaska Native alone (NH)	97 (0.24%)	136 (0.33%)	151 (0.36%)	156 (0.35%)	158 (0.30%)
Asian alone (NH)	618 (1.50%)	423 (1.04%)	340 (0.82%)	439 (0.97%)	680 (1.31%)
Pacific Islander alone (NH)	—	—	20 (0.05%)	21 (0.05%)	34 (0.07%)
Other race alone (NH)	5 (0.01%)	55 (0.13%)	39 (0.09%)	54 (0.12%)	224 (0.43%)
Mixed race or multiracial (NH)	—	—	379 (0.91%)	570 (1.26%)	1,675 (3.23%)
Hispanic or Latino (any race)	5,048 (12.25%)	6,508 (15.94%)	8,520 (20.52%)	12,184 (27.02%)	16,116 (31.05%)
Total	41,201 (100.00%)	40,822 (100.00%)	41,521 (100.00%)	45,099 (100.00%)	51,898 (100.00%)

=== 2020 census ===
As of the 2020 census, there were 51,898 people, 19,526 households, and 13,005 families residing in the city. The population density was 783.06 inhabitants per square mile (302.34/km^{2}). There were 21,493 housing units at an average density of 324.30 per square mile (125.21/km^{2}). The racial makeup of the city was 45.07% White, 27.98% African American, 0.89% Native American, 1.38% Asian, 0.09% Pacific Islander, 10.84% from some other races and 13.74% from two or more races. Hispanic or Latino people of any race were 31.05% of the population.

=== 2010 census ===
As of the 2010 census, there were 45,099 people, 16,628 households, and 11,426 families residing in the city. The population density was 706.85 inhabitants per square mile (272.92/km^{2}). There were 18,773 housing units at an average density of 294.23 per square mile (113.60/km^{2}). The racial makeup of the city was 56.05% White, 29.71% African American, 0.66% Native American, 1.04% Asian, 0.06% Pacific Islander, 9.51% from some other races and 2.99% from two or more races. Hispanic or Latino people of any race were 27.02% of the population.

=== 2000 census ===
As of the 2000 census, there were 41,521 people, 15,479 households, and 10,974 families residing in the city. The population density was 665.72 inhabitants per square mile (257.04/km^{2}). There were 16,715 housing units at an average density of 268.00 per square mile (103.48/km^{2}). The racial makeup of the city was 60.75% White, 27.47% African American, 0.50% Native American, 0.88% Asian, 0.05% Pacific Islander, 8.23% from some other races and 2.12% from two or more races. Hispanic or Latino people of any race were 20.52% of the population.

There were 15,479 households out of which 33.1% had children under the age of 18 living with them, 48.6% were married couples living together, 17.3% had a female householder with no husband present, and 29.1% were non-families. 24.8% of all households were made up of individuals and 9.3% had someone living alone who was 65 years of age or older. The average household size was 2.62 and the average family size was 3.13.

In the city the population was spread out with 26.7% under the age of 18, 9.6% from 18 to 24, 27.8% from 25 to 44, 22.4% from 45 to 64, and 13.4% who were 65 years of age or older. The median age was 36 years. For every 100 females there were 89.4 males. For every 100 females age 18 and over, there were 84.7 males.

The median income for a household in the city was $35,963, and the median income for a family was $42,393. Males had a median income of $36,463 versus $24,754 for females. The per capita income for the city was $17,057. 14.9% of the population and 12.0% of families were below the poverty line. Out of the total people living in poverty, 20.5% were under the age of 18 and 11.2% were 65 or older.

== Economy ==
The Texas City economy has long been based on heavy industry, particularly shipping at the Port of Texas City, as well as petroleum and petrochemical refining. The Texas City Industrial Complex is a leading center of the petrochemical industry. Within this complex, the Galveston Bay Refinery operated by Marathon is the second-largest petroleum refinery in Texas and third-largest in the United States. The Port of Texas City became the third-leading port in Texas by tonnage and ninth in the nation. In recent decades, the city's planners have made efforts to diversify the economy into tourism, health care, and many other sectors. As early as 1974, Texas City was placed on the top-10 list for the EPA superfund. Outdated practices for the disposal of toxic waste have continued there for years.

The Port of Texas City, operated by the Port of Texas City / Texas City Terminal Railway, is the eighth-largest port in the United States and the third-largest in Texas, with waterborne tonnage exceeding 78 million net tons. The Texas City Terminal Railway Company provides an important land link to the port, handling over 25,000 carloads per year. The Port of Texas City's success as a privately owned port has been aided by its shareholders, the Union Pacific and Burlington Northern Santa Fe railroads, whose connections allow for expeditious interchange of their traffic.

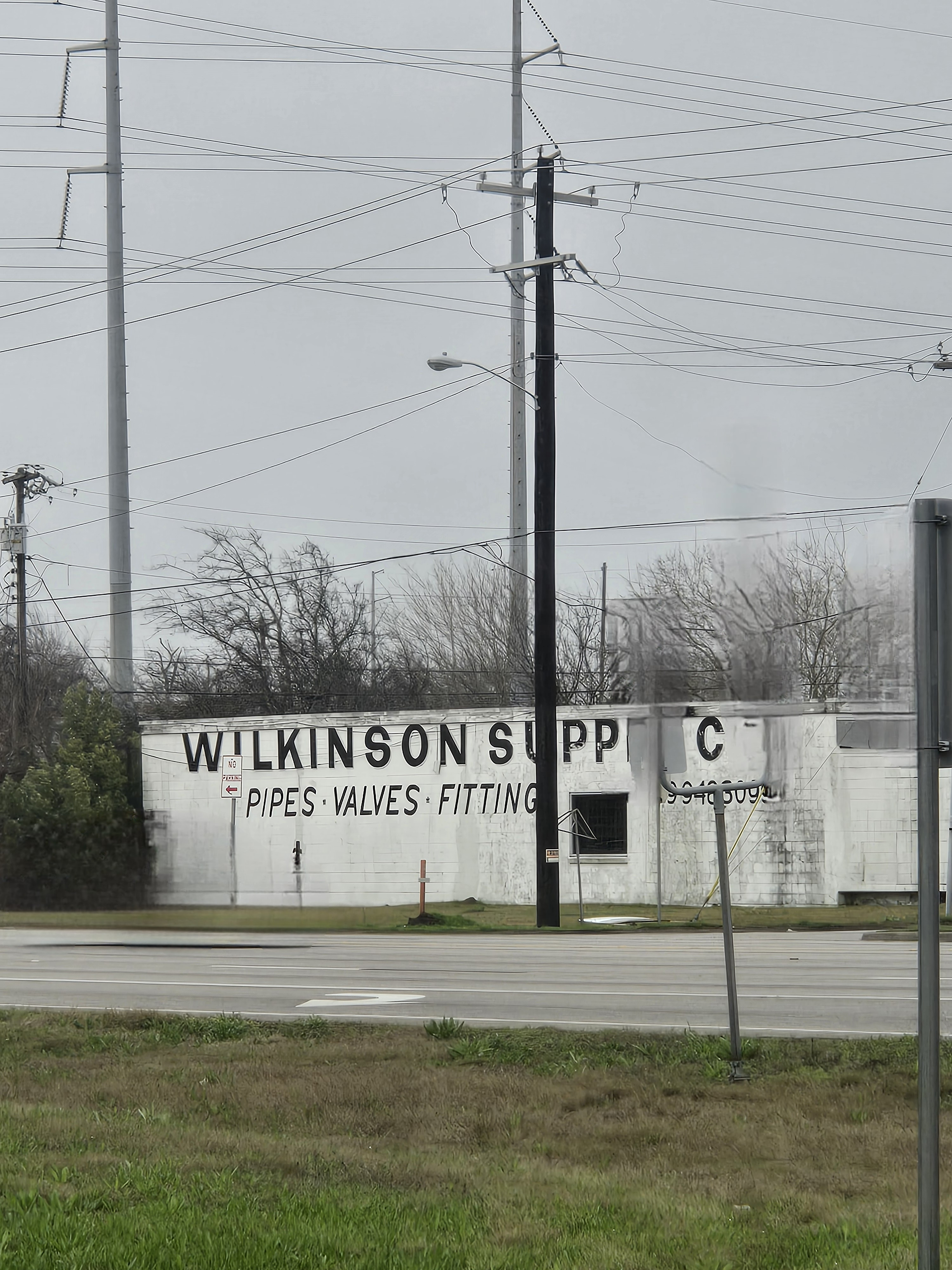
Wilkinson Supply Company in Texas City, Texas

The Galveston County Juvenile Justice Department Jerry J. Esmond Juvenile Justice Center is in Texas City. Prisoners there attend the Dickinson Independent School District.

The Texas Department of Criminal Justice maintains the Young Medical Facility Complex for females in Texas City. Young opened in 1996 as the Texas City Regional Medical Unit.

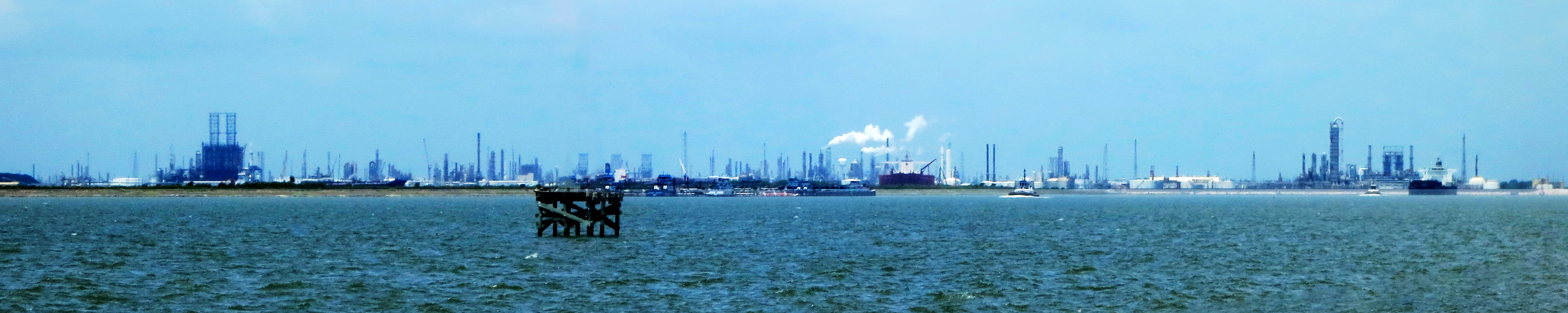
Texas City petroleum refining and petrochemical manufacturing center

== Arts and culture ==
In 1928, the city dedicated a room in city hall to form a municipal library, operated by the Texas City Civic Club. In 1947, city hall received damage from the Texas City explosion; it was later demolished. In 1948, the library moved to a former house. In 1964, the library moved into its current building. In 1984, the Moore Memorial Public Library was expanded to 21,000 square feet (2,000 m^{2}).

The Texas City Museum includes the Galveston County Model Railroad Club exhibit.

== Parks and recreation ==
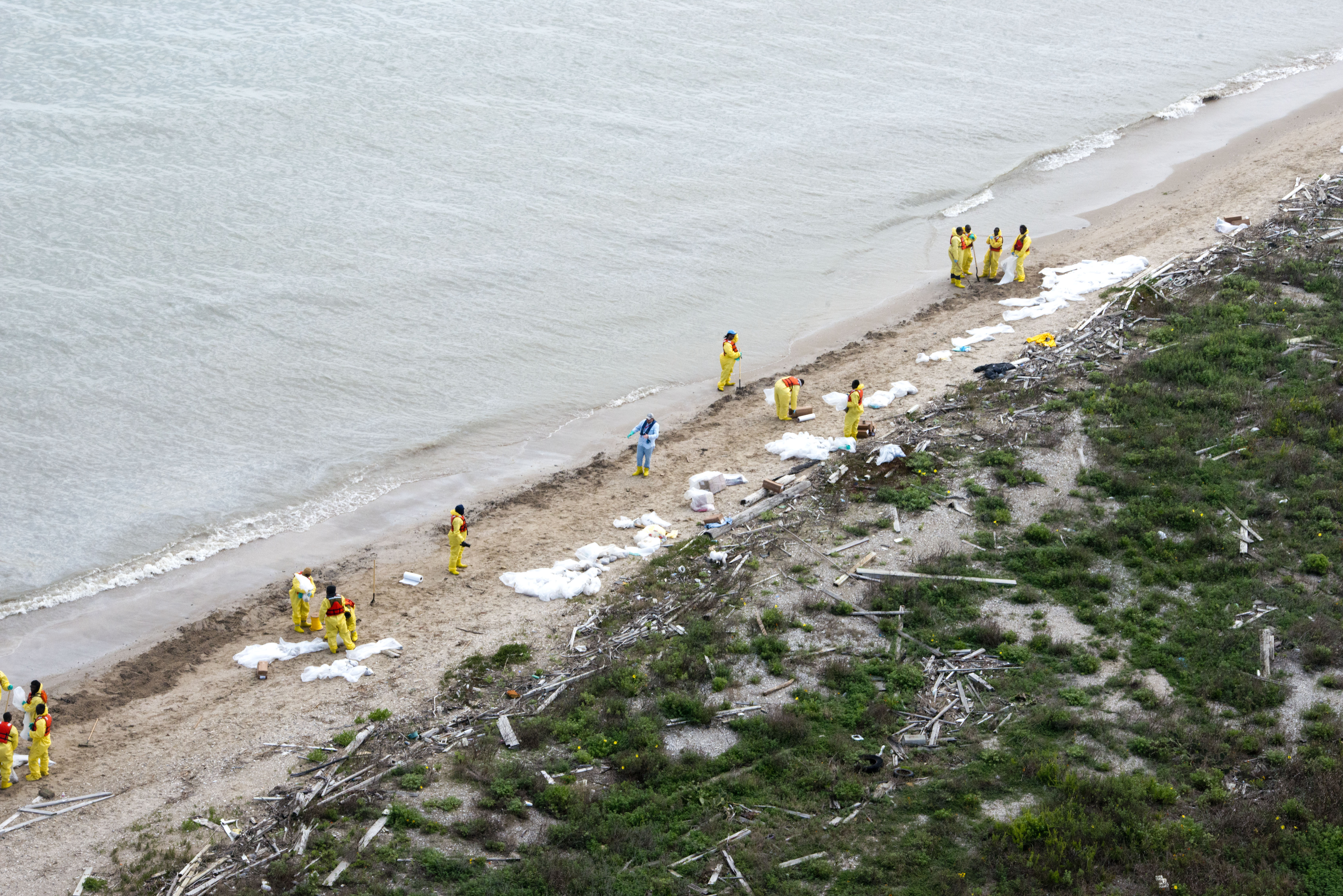
Federal and local agency workers help clean up the beaches affected by an oil spill on March 27, 2014, in Texas City

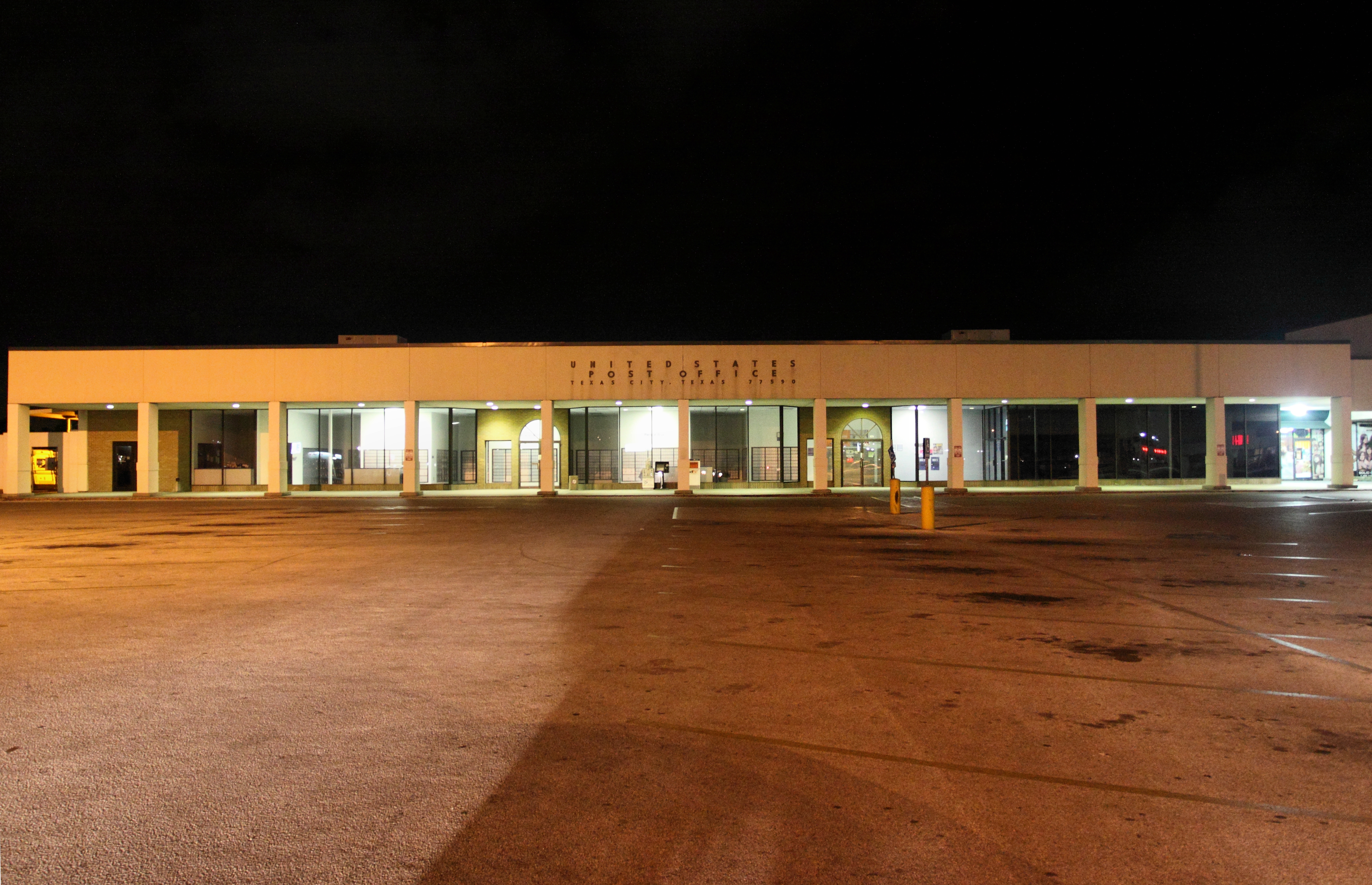
Texas City Post Office

The city operates 42 parks, some of which are part of the Great Texas Coastal Birding Trail.

The Texas City Prairie Preserve is a 2,300-acre (930-hectare) nature preserve located on the shores of Moses Lake opposite the city. The terrain of the preserve includes prairie and wetland habitats. The preserve includes 40 acres (16 hectares) of public-access areas, including campsites. The remainder of the preserve is available for tours, including boardwalk access through the marshes.

The Bay Street Park is a 45-acre (18-hectare) property near the bay and the levee. Part of the park commemorates the Aero Squadron, one of the first U.S. Army air squadrons and a precursor to the modern Air Force. The rest of the park features wilderness trails and family entertainment areas.

Nessler Park is a 55-acre (22-hectare) property used for community events such as the annual "Music Fest by the Bay". Other large city parks include Carver Park, Godard Park, and Holland Park.

The centerpiece of Texas City's Heritage Square historical district is the former residence of one of the city's fathers, Frank B. Davison. The Victorian-styled Davison Home was completed in 1897.

== Education ==
=== Primary and secondary schools ===
==== Public schools ====
Most of Texas City is served by the Texas City Independent School District (TCISD), which has four elementary schools for kindergarten through grade 4: Kohfeldt Elementary, Roosevelt-Wilson Elementary, Heights Elementary, and Guajardo Elementary. The TCISD intermediate school, Levi Fry Intermediate, provides for fifth and sixth graders, and one TCISD middle school, Blocker Middle School, provides for seventh and eighth graders. Texas City High School serves the TCISD portion of Texas City.

Other portions are a part of the Dickinson Independent School District. Some were previously in the La Marque Independent School District. On December 2, 2015, Texas Education Agency Commissioner Michael Williams announced that the Texas City Independent School District would absorb the La Marque district effective July 1, 2016.

==== Private schools ====
Our Lady of Fatima School, a Roman Catholic elementary school operated by the Archdiocese of Galveston-Houston, is in Texas City.

=== Colleges and universities ===
Texas City is served by the College of the Mainland, which is located in Texas City.

== Infrastructure ==
=== Transportation ===
The major freeway serving the area is the Gulf Freeway, part of Interstate 45, which connects Texas City with Galveston and Houston. Texas State Highway 146 locally connects Texas City with other Galveston Bay Area communities on the shoreline. Texas Loop 197 combines with Highway 146 to form a ring around the city, providing access to the city's major areas.

=== Police ===
In 2008, civilian code-enforcement officers were replaced by police officers because residents tended to ignore civilian officials.

=== Health and animal services ===
The Galveston County Health District is headquartered in Texas City.

Galveston County Animal Resource Center, an animal shelter operated by the GCHD, is in Texas City. As per a governmental agreement, the Texas City government contracts with the health district for animal shelter services.

== Notable people ==
- Chris Ballard, NFL Colts general manager
- Tajh Bellow, actor
- Charles Brown, blues singer and pianist
- John Carona, politician
- Frank B. Davison, city pioneer who built Davison home, now a museum
- George Ducas, country music singer
- Charlie Dupre, former NFL player
- L.G. Dupre, former NFL player
- Ben Emanuel, American football player
- D'Onta Foreman, professional football player
- Andy Hassler, Major League Baseball, player
- Johnny Lee, country music singer
- Edi Patterson, actress on The Righteous Gemstones
- Stone Phillips, television reporter and correspondent
- Ron Raines, actor
- Mary Simpson, one of the first women to be ordained a priest by the American Episcopal Church
- David Self, screenwriter

== In popular culture ==
- The 2021 movie Red Rocket is set in Texas City.
