= Adaptive Standing Tennis =

Tennis for people with a physical disability

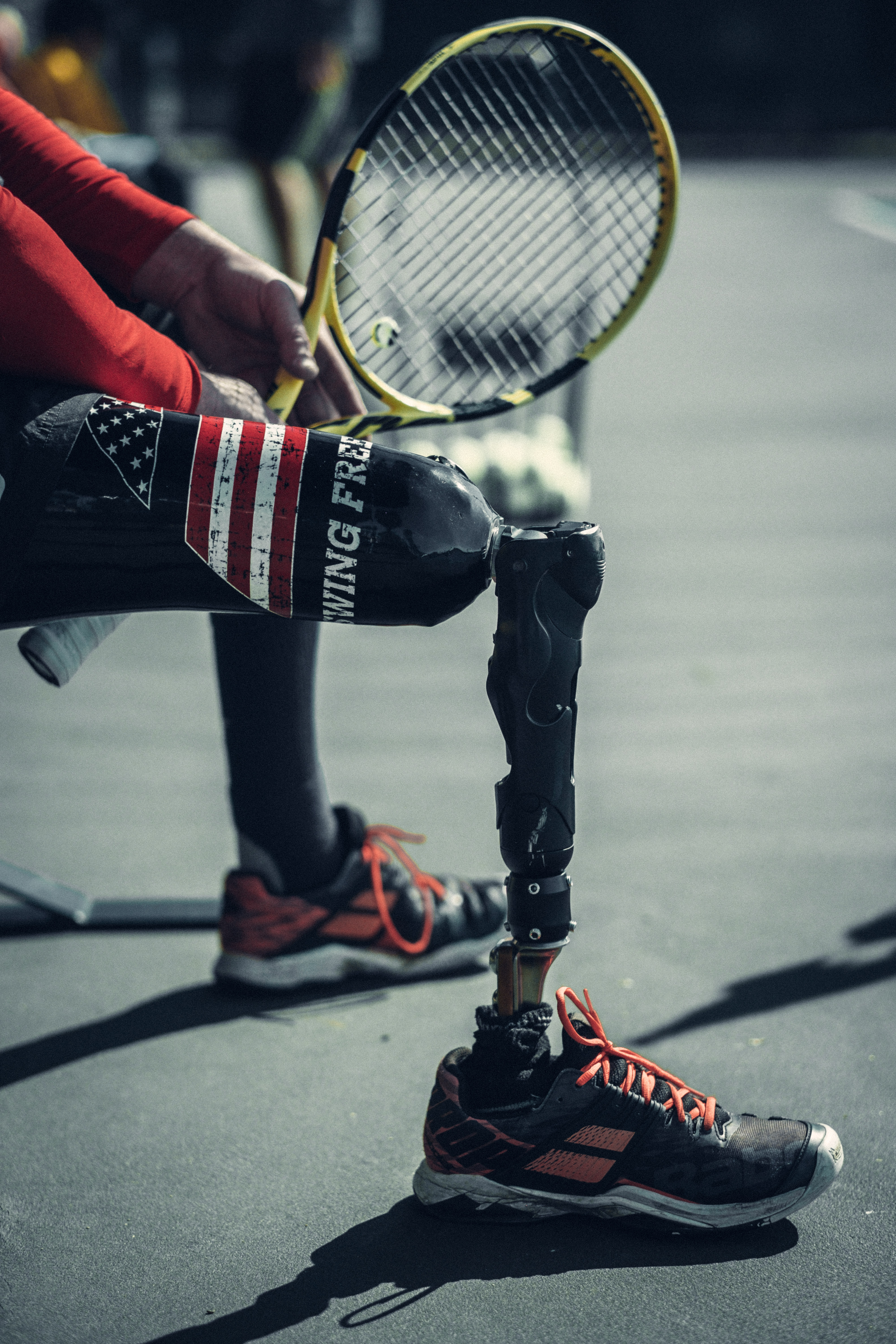
Adaptive Standing Tennis is a form of tennis for individuals with a disability that play tennis standing, or ambulatory as opposed to playing in a wheelchair

Para Standing Tennis is a form of tennis for individuals with physical disability who play the sport of tennis standing, or ambulatory as opposed to their counterparts who play wheelchair tennis, playing tennis in a wheelchair.

The newly emerged form of tennis allows individuals with physical disability the opportunity to play tennis standing. People who play para standing tennis may have an amputation, cerebral palsy, limb malformations, or hemiplegia. Para standing tennis is also referred to as Adaptive Standing Tennis (PST), or Tenis Adaptivo de Pie (TAP), meaning stand-up adaptive tennis in Spanish.

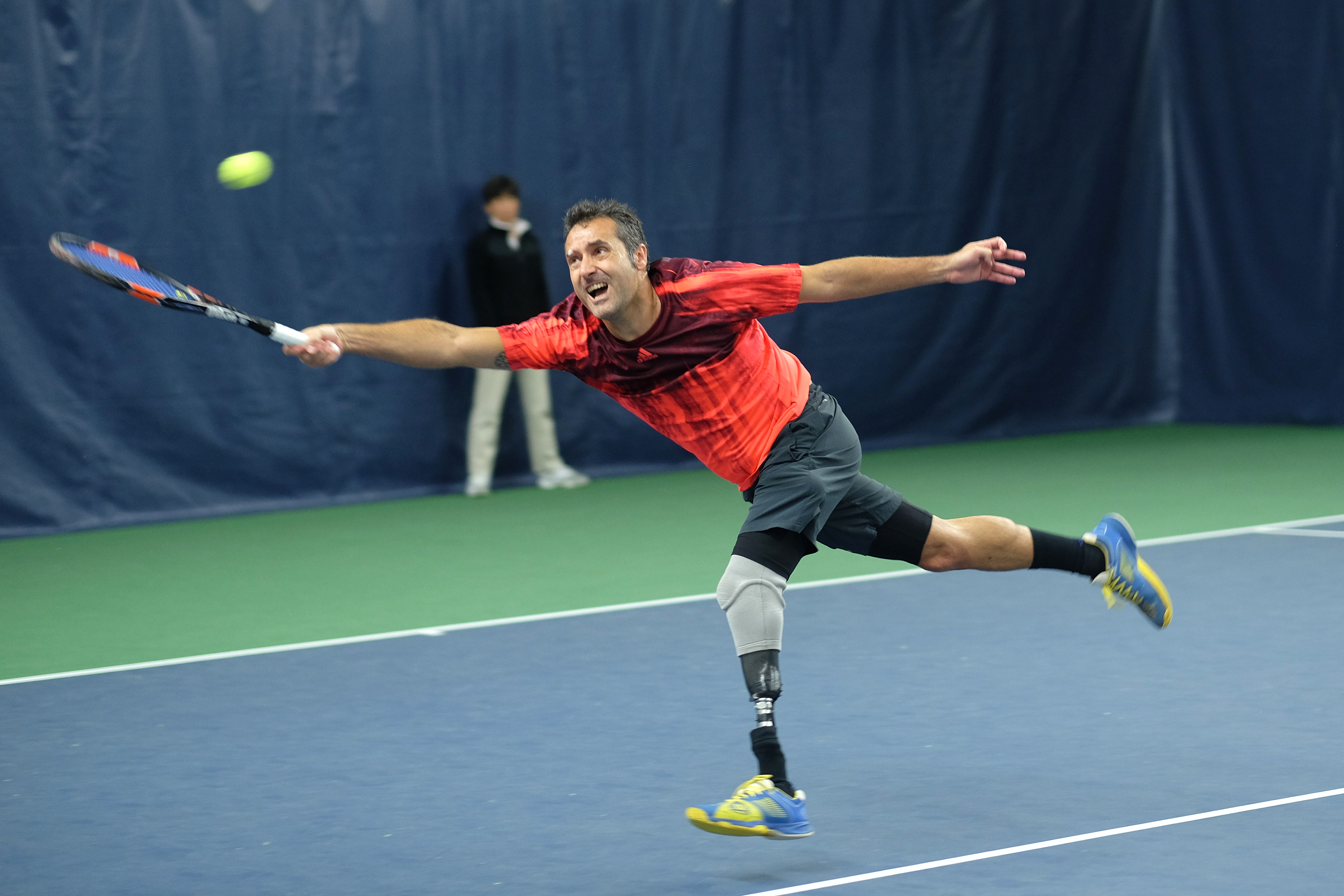
Ivan Corretja of Spain was the champion (Category A; 2016) at the Inaugural 2016 USA TAP Open in Houston, Texas

PST is recognized by the International Tennis Federation and is seeking certification from the International Paralympic Committee to be played at tennis grand slams and in the Paralympics.

== History ==
This form of tennis has its organized roots coming from Latin America. Locations in Mexico and South America were the first to begin organizing efforts for tennis tournaments and programming specifically tailored to individuals who qualified to play para standing tennis. The form of tennis became referred to as tenis adaptivo de pie. Translated from Spanish to English as playing from the foot up, or standing adaptive tennis. Tenis Adaptivo de pie is also referred to by the acronym TAP.

Throughout the years and origin of adaptive sports many individuals began to participate not only for their own interest but for socialization. In 1937, John Poulin of Austria started playing tennis with a lower limb amputation to one of his legs against pedestrians with the aid of crutches. He is considered to be the first known para standing tennis player. Antonio Solano of Mexico, born in 1960, is considered to be the first known person with upper extremity disability, congenital limb malformation or shortened arms, to play para standing tennis.

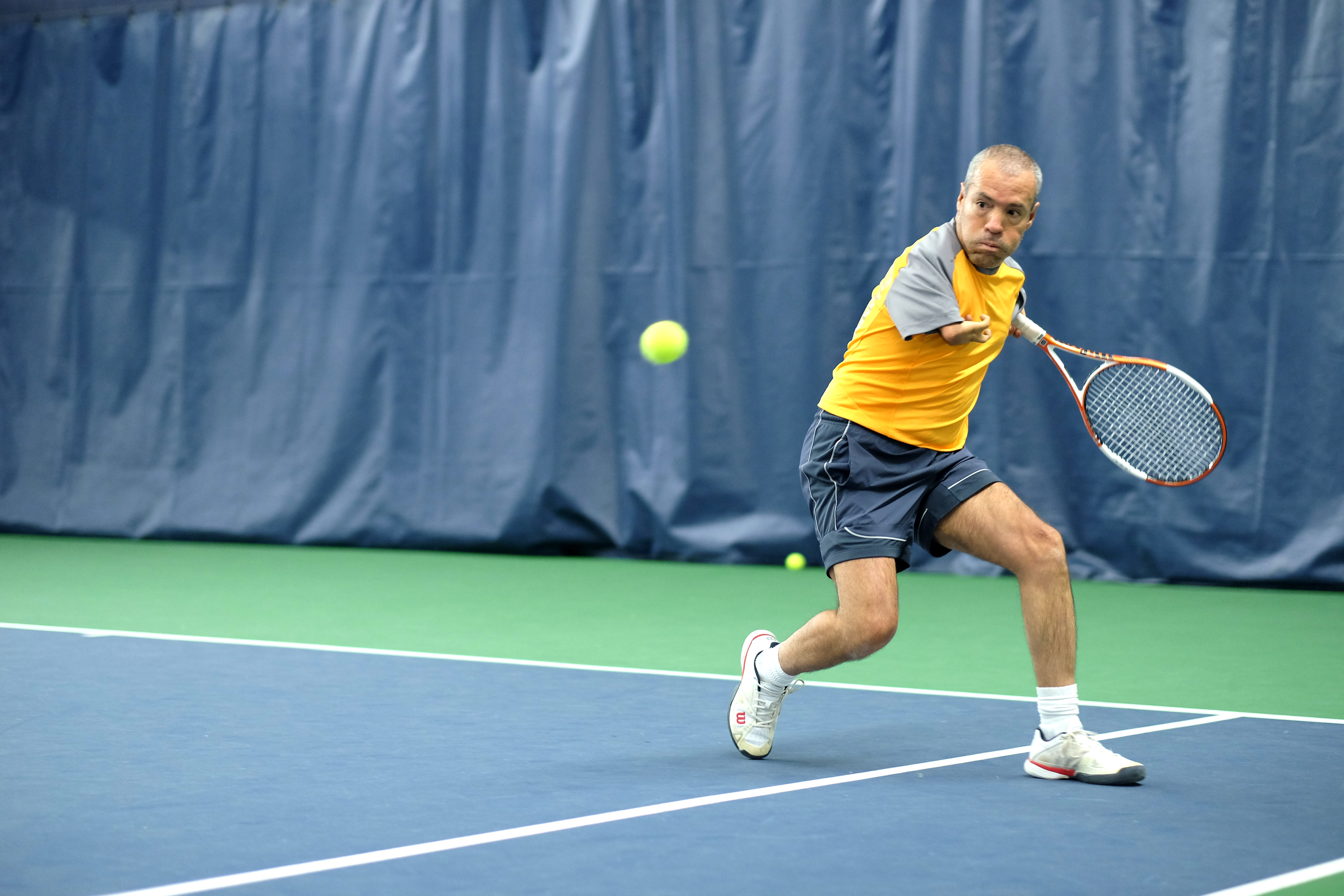
Antonio Solano of Mexico playing in the 2016 USA TAP Open Adaptive Standing Tennis World Championship in Houston, Texas

As advancements in technology in prosthetics and orthotics have increased over the years, persons with physical disabilities began to compete in tennis tournaments with the aid of prosthetic legs, arms, and orthotic braces. Before being labeled a more organized modality of tennis, several exhibitions and tournaments took place around the world. Today, a growing number of organizers operate a schedule of tournaments around the world.

== Tournaments ==
Since para standing tennis was not recognized by governing federations of tennis until 2023, previous tournaments were considered exhibition events.

The first organized International adaptive standing tennis tournament took place at the Tres Marias Club in Morelia, Michoacán, Mexico in 2013. Participants from five countries came to compete in the tournament.

On December 11-12, 2015 the Master Final TAP was held in Santiago, Chile. The tournament was organized by the TAP Foundation as part of the TAP World Tour. The TAP World Tour is an International tennis circuit for persons who play para standing tennis. Enzo Amadei Jerez and Ana Maria Rodriguez are the founders of the TAP Foundation and TAP World Tour.

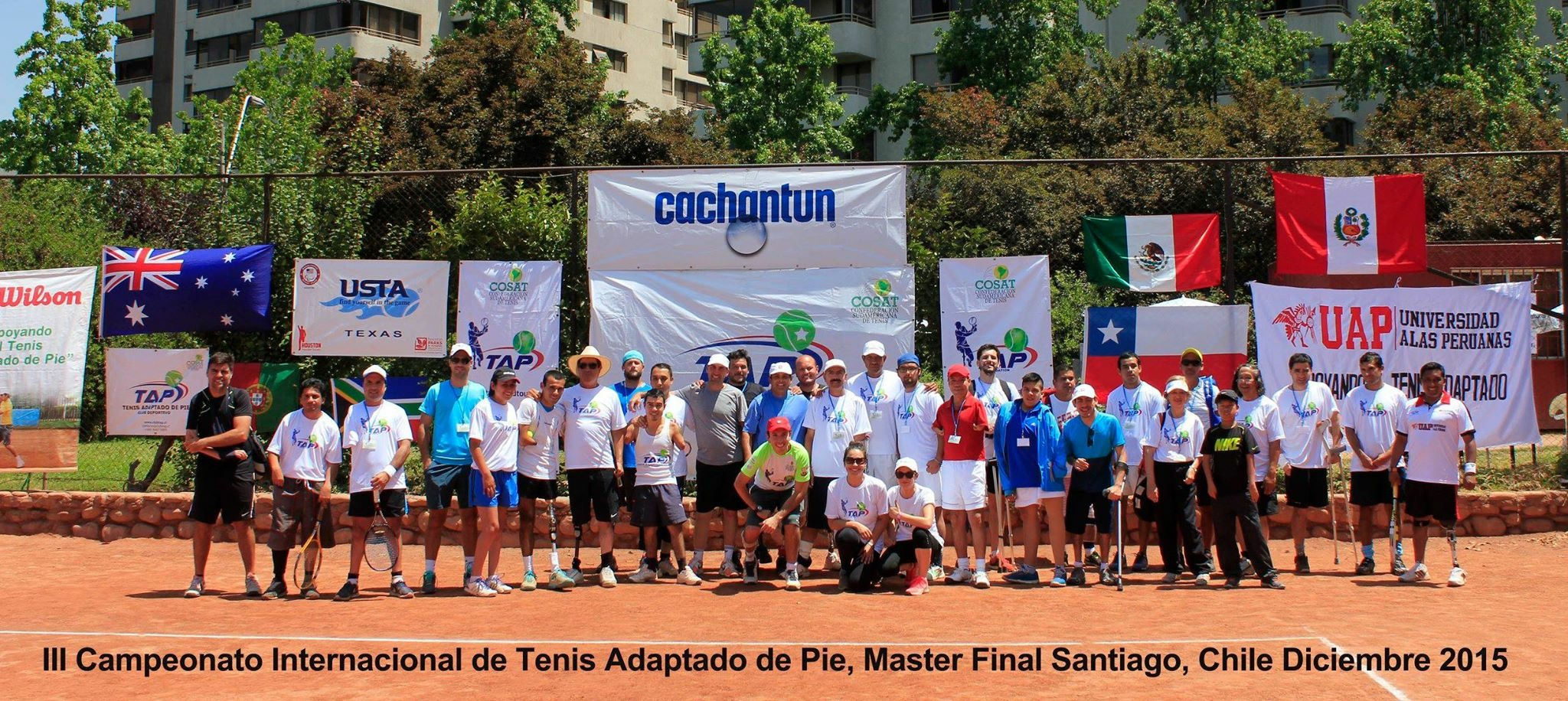
The Master Final TAP in Santiago, Chile which took place in December 2015

The United States hosted its first International event with the Inaugural USA TAP Open which was held December 9–11, 2016 in Houston, Texas. The tournament was organized by Cindy Benzon, Jeff Bourns, Harold Graham, Enzo Amadei Jerez, and Ana Maria Rodriguez with support from the United States Tennis Association of Texas. 1987 International Tennis Hall of Fame inductee Dennis Ralston was the honorary tournament ambassador. 28 players from 11 countries around the world came to compete in the inaugural event. The USA TAP Open served as the International Adaptive Standing Tennis World Championships from 2016 until 2019 before being interrupted by the COVID-19 pandemic.

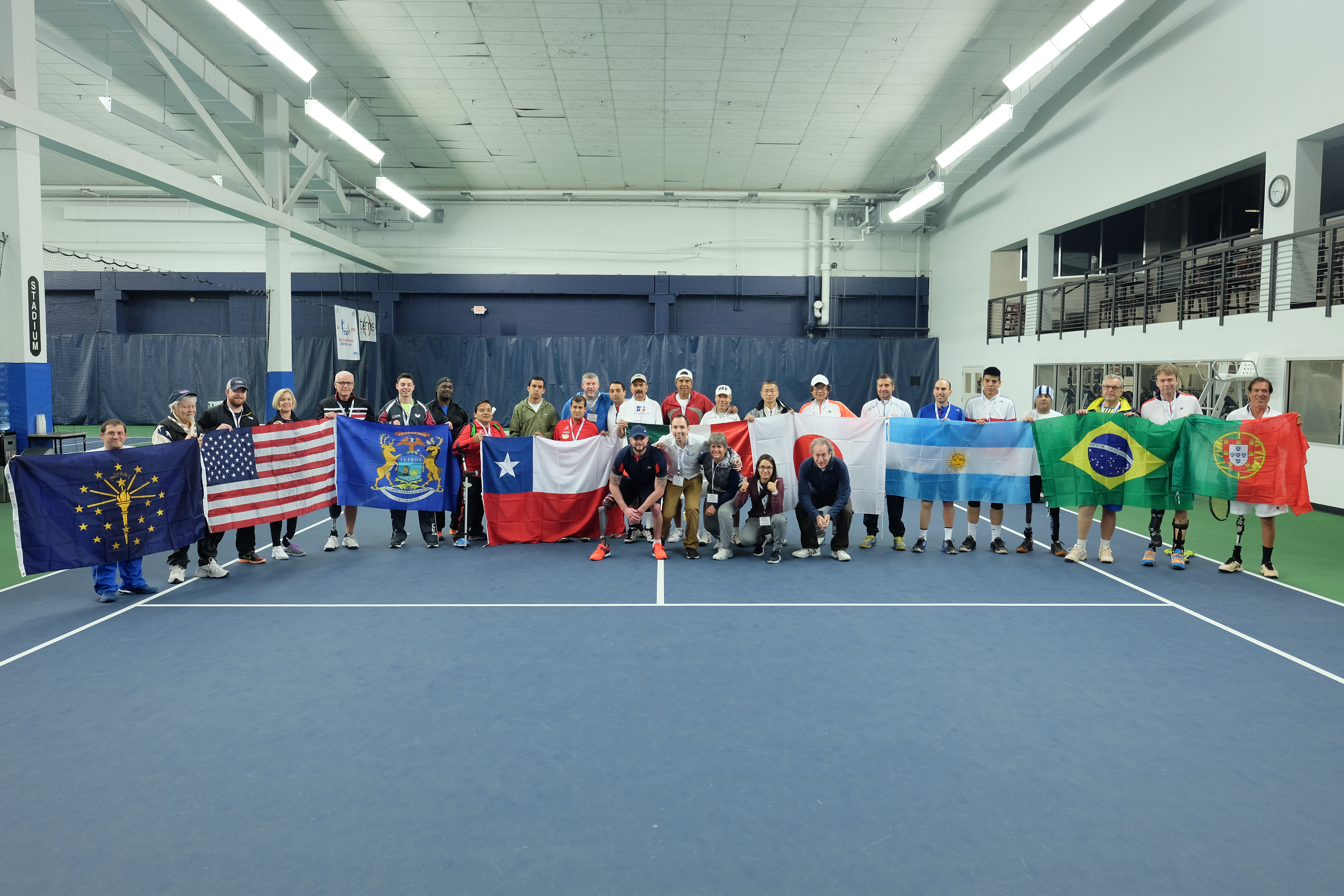
The Inaugural USA TAP OPEN was the first International Adaptive Standing Tennis Tournament in the United States taking place December 9–11, 2016 in Houston, Texas. 28 competitors from 11 countries participated in the World Championship.

The Orthotics Prosthetics Activities Foundation (OPAF) was founded by Robin Burton. The foundation held "first volley" clinics across the United States in an effort to get people playing tennis. The clinics were for both wheelchair and standing amputee tennis players. OPAF held the first United States based amputee tennis tournament in November 2016.

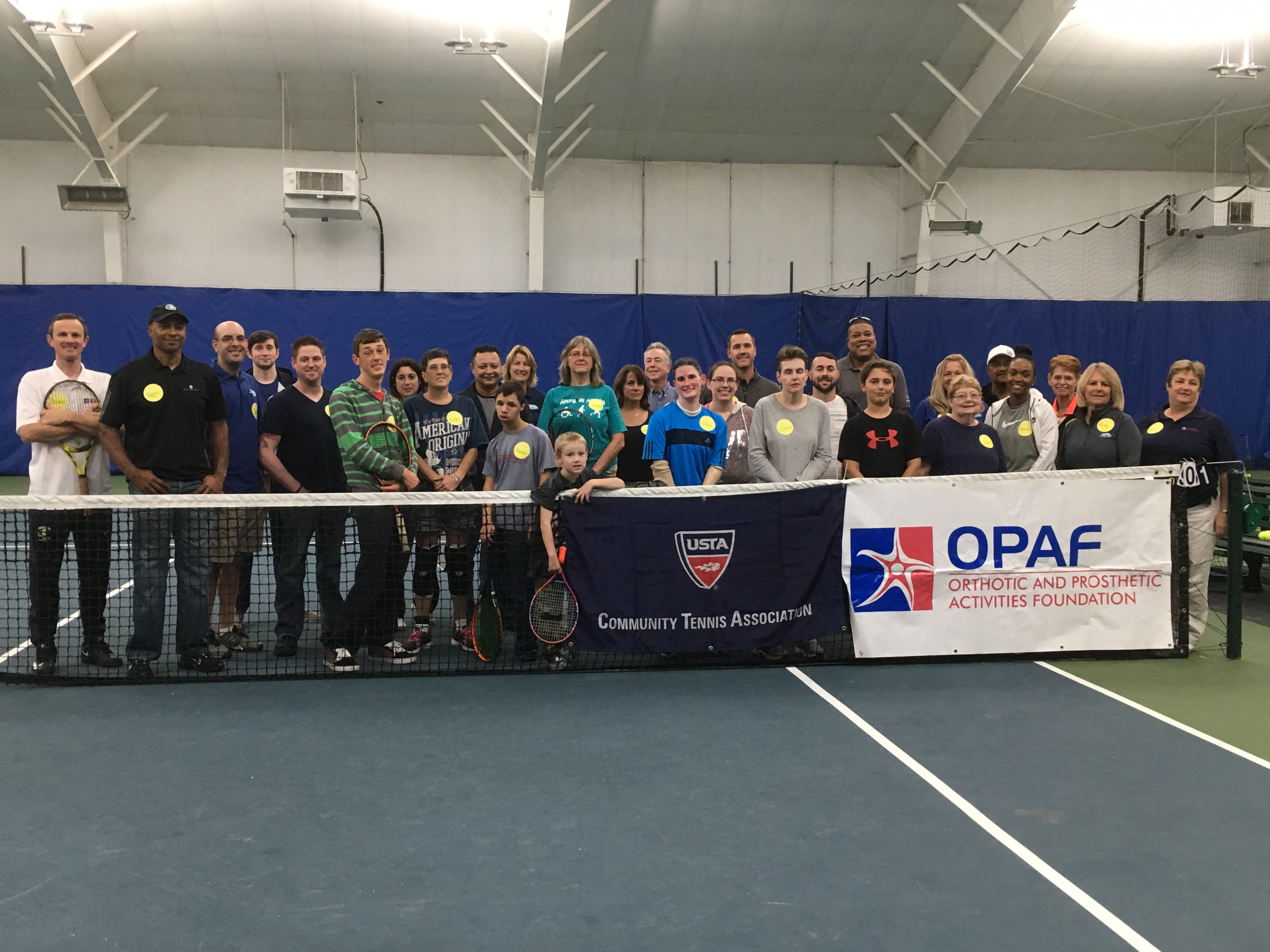
The Orthotics and Prosthetics Activities Foundation hosting an amputee tennis tournament at Cherry Hill Health and Tennis Club

The Carolinas Adaptive Standing Tennis Association (CAST) began to host annual tournaments at Pinetop Tennis Club with the Inaugural CAST Open April 26–28, 2019 in Greensboro, North Carolina. The organization was founded by John Hizer.

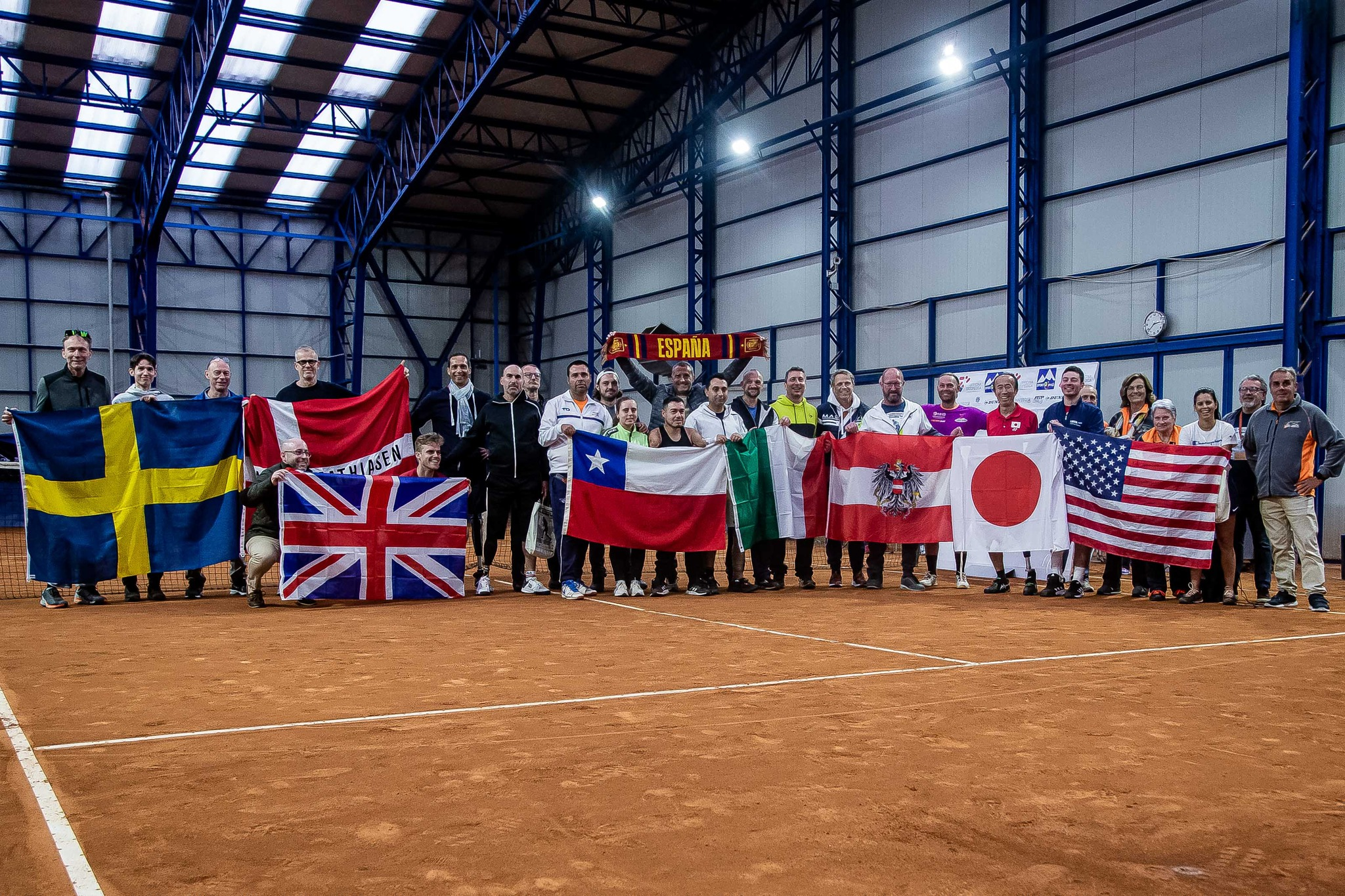
2023 PST Italian Open in Turin. The tournament was largest in Europe and featured players from 12 countries.

Europe hosted its first international level tournament at the 2018 Malmo Open in Malmo, Sweden. The Malmo Open is Europe's largest para sporting event. The tournament was organized by Harald Von Koch and the organizing staff of the Malmo Open. Europe has since seen expanded growth and development in Para-Standing Tennis. In 2023, the PST Italian Open in Turin featured 30+ athletes from 12 different countries. The tournament singles winners were Brazilian Thalita Rodrigues (PST1-2) and American Danny Scrivano (PST3-4).

Japan is known to be the first country that created a national incorporated organization, Japan Adaptive Stand-Up Tennis Association (JASTA). The organization was formed in 2019 by Ken Shibatani and Reiko Shibatani.
