= Jeff Bourns =

American tennis player

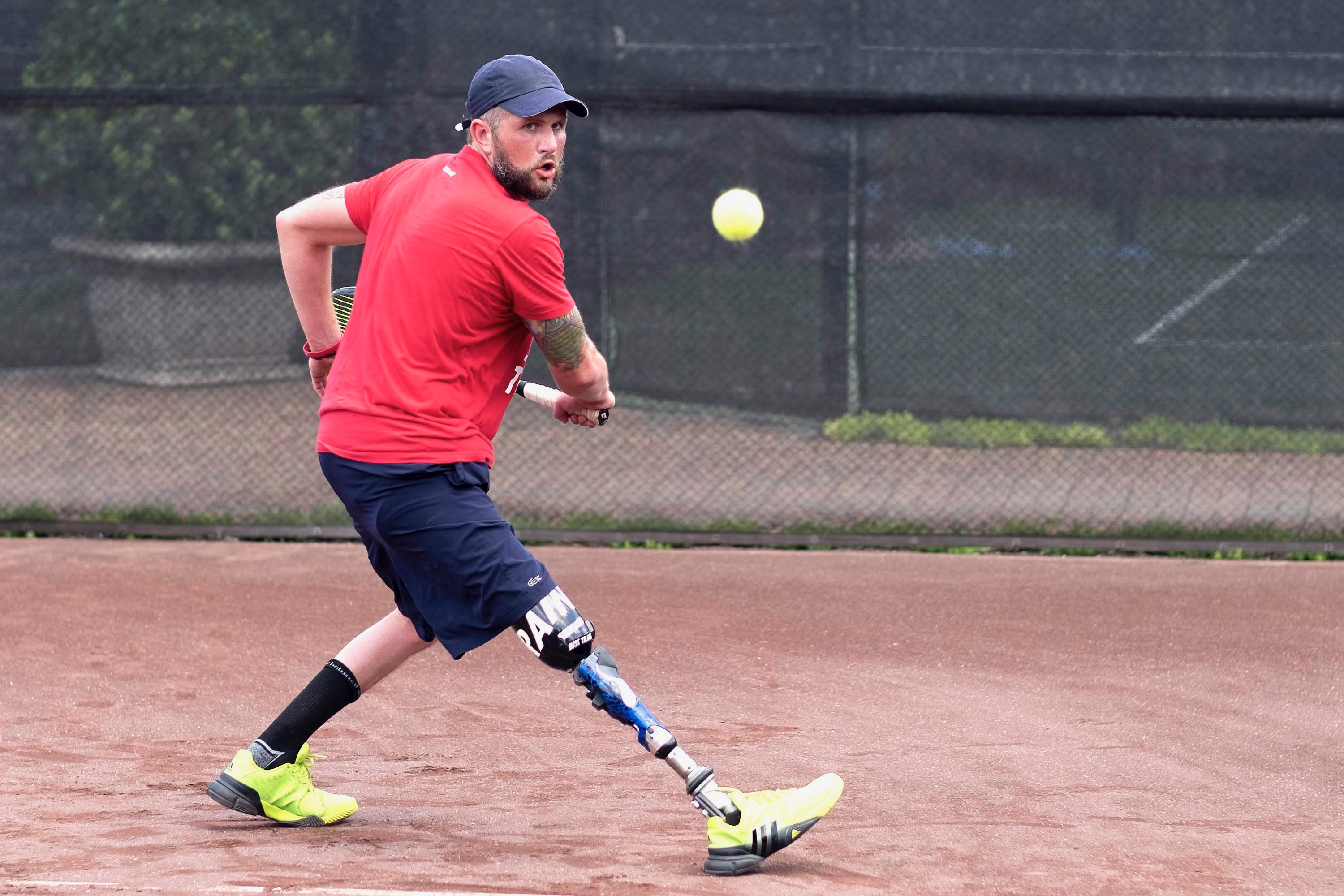
- Jeff Bourns setting up to return a backhand at River Oaks Country Club
- Full name: Jeffrey Richard Bourns
- Country (sports): United States
- Residence: Houston, Texas
- Born: August 18, 1981 (age 45) Parkersburg, West Virginia
- Height: 5 ft 11 in (1.80 m)
- Turned pro: 2015
- Retired: 2019
- Plays: Right handed (Two-handed backhand)
- Coach: Irwin Montalvo

Singles
- Highest ranking: No. 4 (Category A)

Jeff Bourns (born August 18, 1981) is an American amputee tennis player who helped pioneer the growth and development of Adaptive Standing Tennis.

Bourns was the first American to represent the United States in international para-standing tennis tournaments, also known as adaptive standing tennis.

In 2016 he helped organize the First International Adaptive Standing Tennis Tournament to take place in the United States, the USA TAP Open, with Houston, Texas playing host. The USA TAP OPEN helped to popularize and pioneer a new category of tennis for individuals in the United States and abroad.

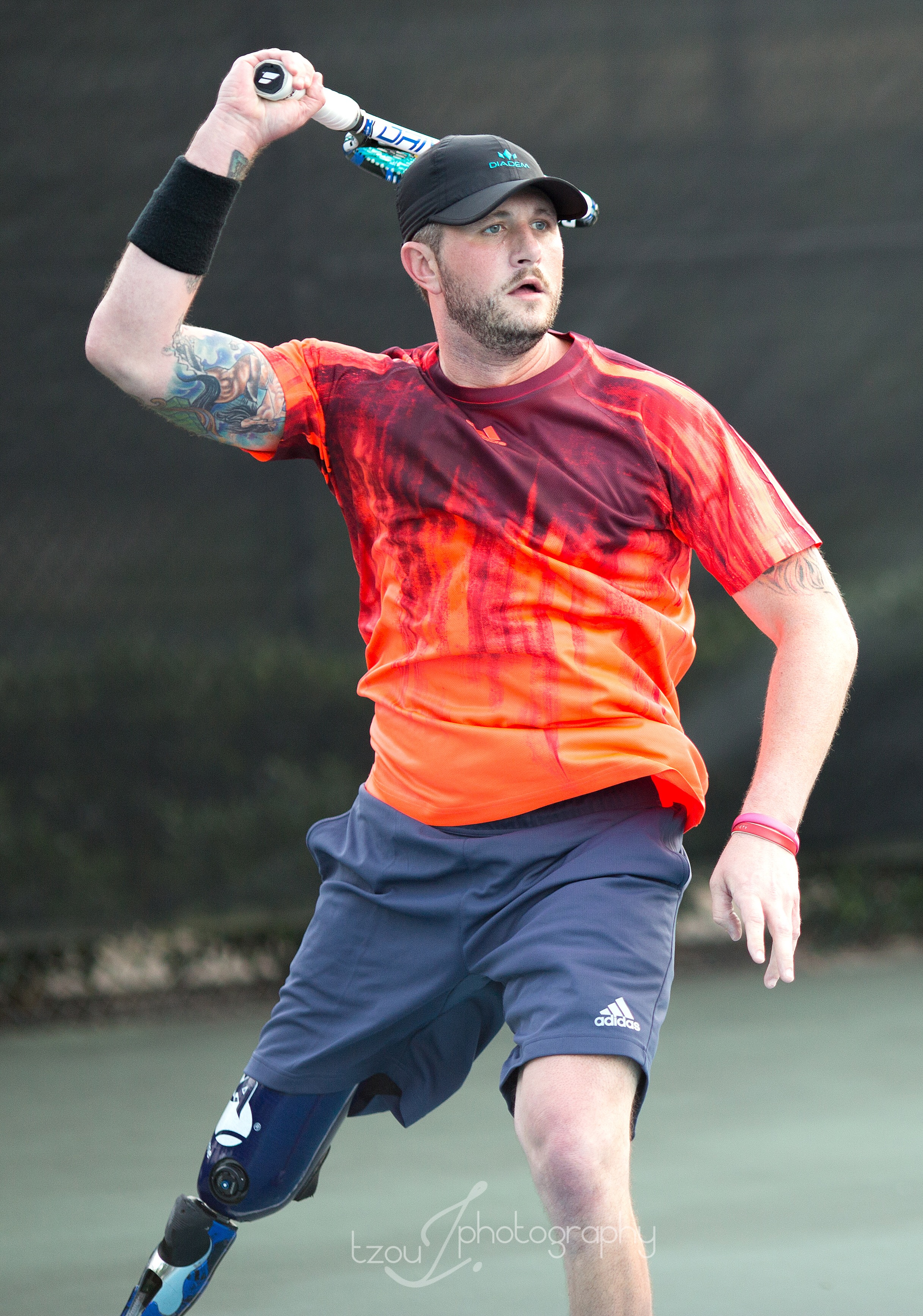
United States Adaptive Standing Tennis player Jeff Bourns training for the 2016 Brazil Open held in Uberlandia, Brazil

Bourns retired ranked No. 4 in the world and top ranked American in his (TAP) classification in 2019.

== Early life ==
Bourns was born in Parkersburg, West Virginia in Wood County on August 18, 1981. He is the oldest of three boys. He was born with a congenital birth defect to his right leg, known as Tibial Hemimelia. As a result, his leg was amputated below the knee when he was two years old. He spent the early years of his life in Belpre, Ohio in Washington County along the Little Hocking River. His family relocated to Houston, Texas in 1987 and his leg was amputated once again, above the knee. A year later it was discovered he had Tethered spinal cord syndrome. He developed bacterial spinal meningitis while recovering from the operation.

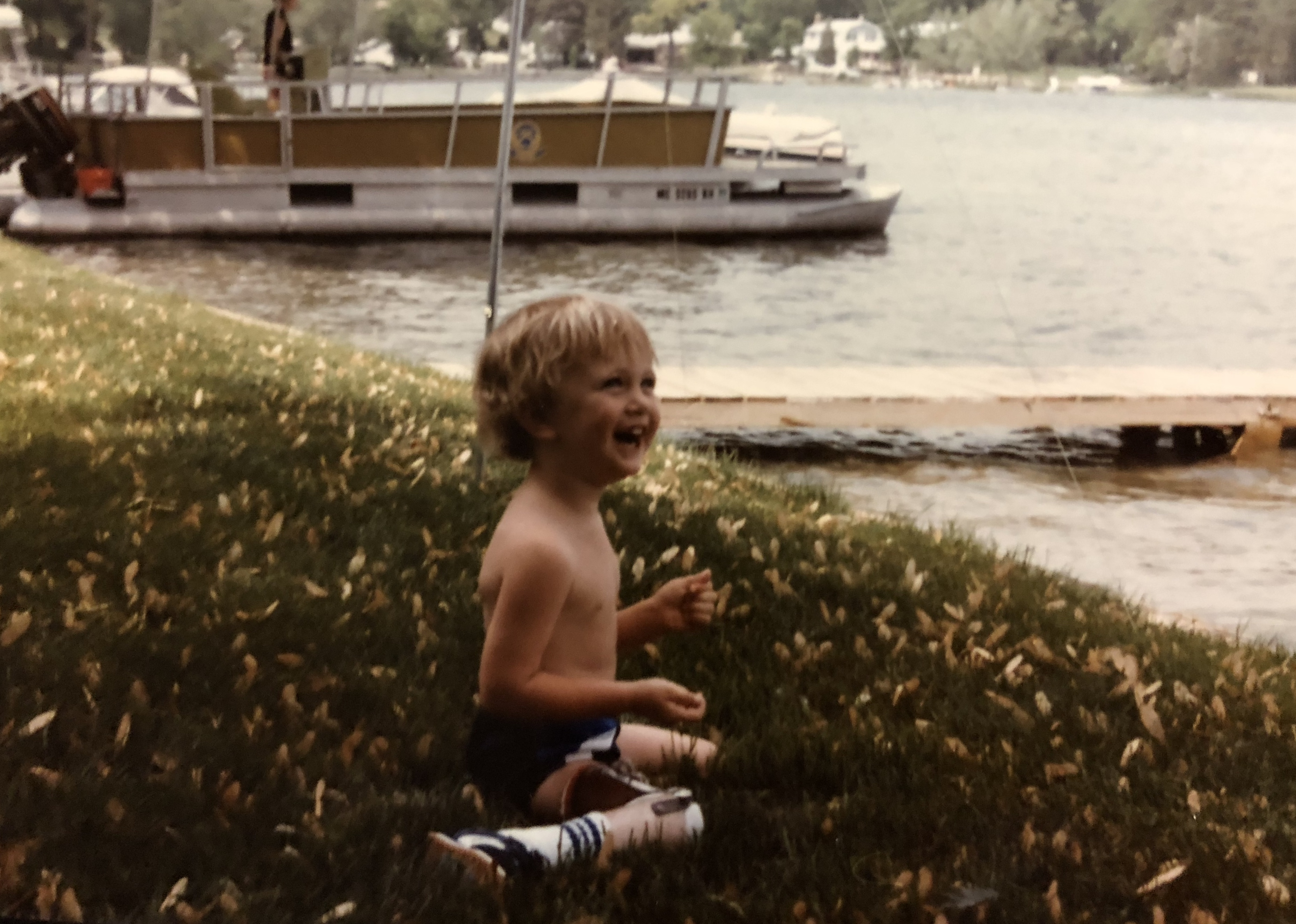
Jeff Bourns at his great-grandmother's lake home in Silver Lake, Michigan in 1983

Bourns attended Clear Brook High School in Friendswood, Texas, graduating in 2000. He played the euphonium in the marching band and competed on his high school tennis team, playing against other able-bodied students. He grew up in an era where Adaptive Sports were not wide spread and well known. Following high school he signed a contract as an athlete with Hanger Prosthetics and Orthotics. Kevin Carroll built his first sprinting prosthesis in 2001.

Bourns is a graduate of San Jacinto College. While attending college he was a member of Phi Beta Lambda. He worked in the hospitality industry as a waiter and associate manager at Truluck's restaurant and has a level one wine sommelier certification.

Bourns is the father of one child with Lauren Nicole Frolick. Parker Richard Bourns was born December 16, 2004, in Pasadena, Texas. Jeff Bourns currently resides in Houston.

== Professional career ==
Bourns rediscovered his passion for tennis after recovering from a spinal cord injury in 2010. He started a non profit organization for amputees, the Houston Amputee Society. Bourns helped organize Houston's first amputee skateboarding and WCMX clinic in March 2013 at Lee and Joe Jamil skatepark assisted by professional skateboarder Sean Malto.

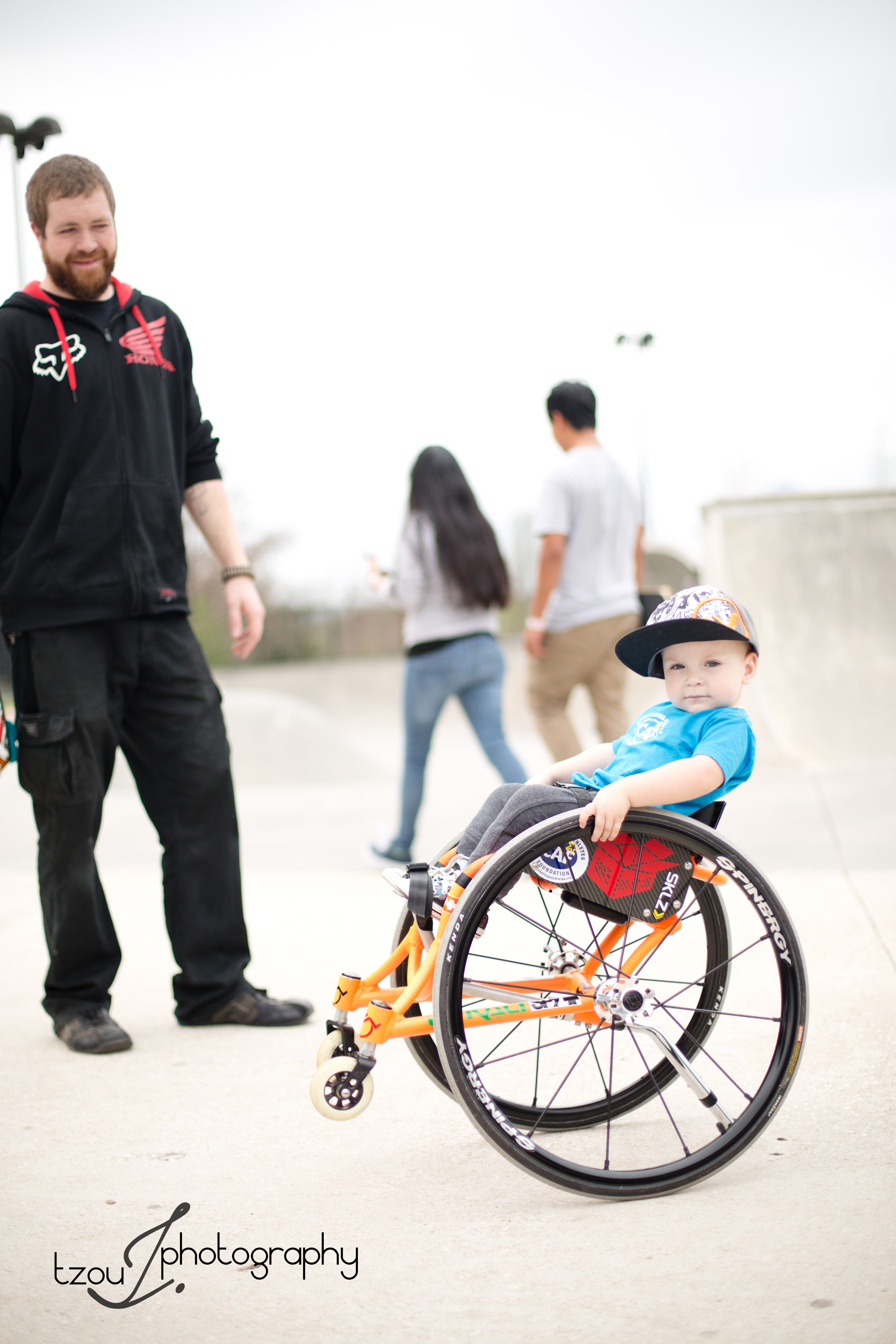
Abel Rose of Waxahachie, Texas at Houston's first amputee skateboarding and WCMX event at Lee and Joe Jamail skate park, March 8, 2013

Bourns found a wheelchair tennis program available at Houston's Metropolitan Multi-Service Center. Instead of playing in a wheelchair he played standing or ambulatory on his prosthesis as he did growing up. While a student in the class he searched for adaptive tennis programs for amputees who played standing. He could not find any, anywhere. In 2014 Bourns started an amputee tennis program at Houston's Metropolitan Multi-Service Center. He partnered with the United States Tennis Association of Texas (USTA) and city of Houston. In 2014 Bourns was selected to serve on USTA Texas' adaptive and wheelchair committee charged with helping pioneer and grow the sport of tennis for amputees. He is the first person to represent the United States competing in International adaptive standing tennis tournaments. He learned of an International adaptive standing tennis tournament to take place December 11–13, 2015 in Santiago, Chile. Bourns finished in the quarterfinals of the Masters Final TAP and began competing on the TAP World Tour in 2015. The TAP World Tour is a competitive circuit for tennis players with physical disabilities who play tennis standing rather than in wheelchairs.

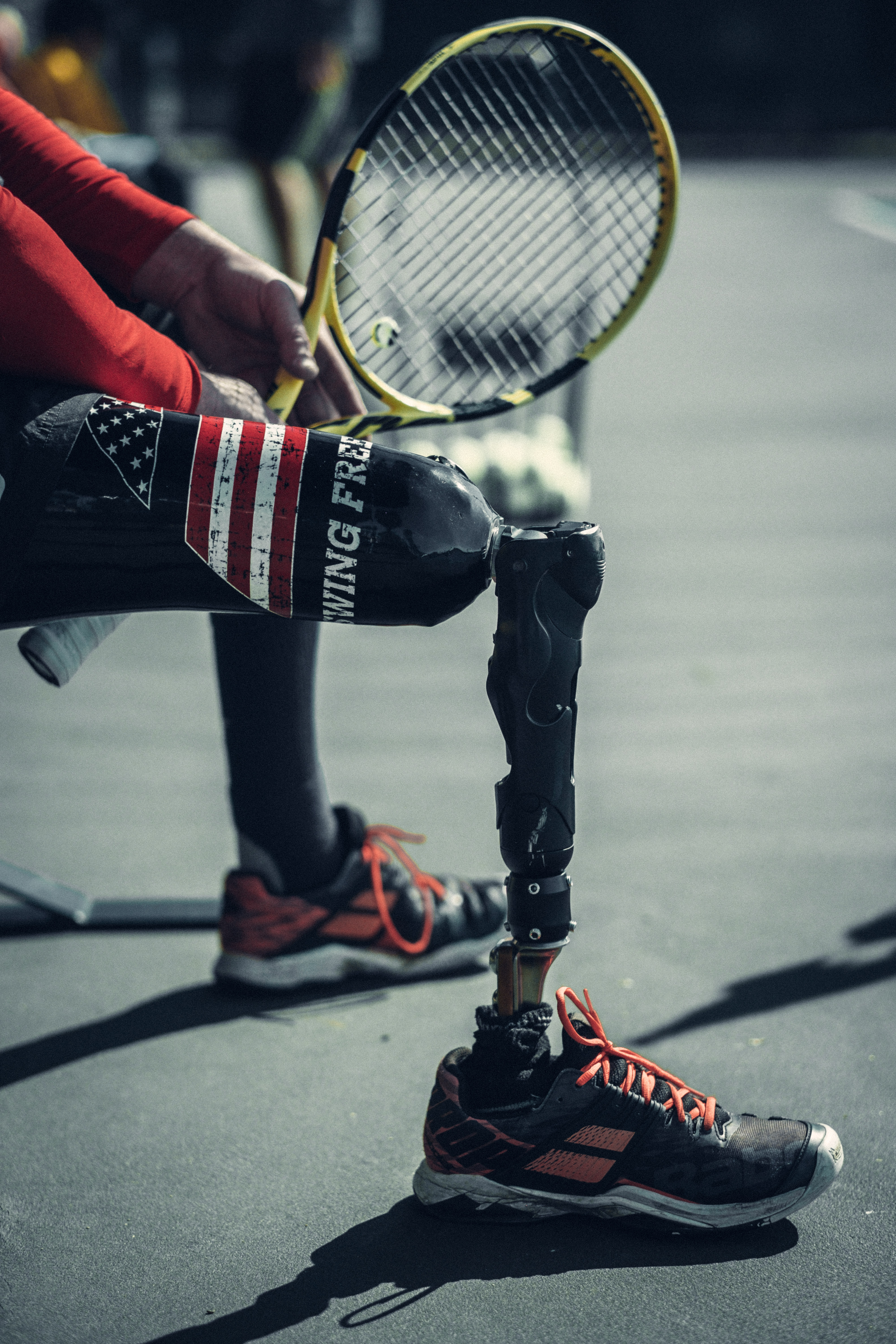
Adaptive Standing Tennis is a form of tennis for individuals with a disability that play tennis standing, or ambulatory as opposed to playing in a wheelchair

At the Brazil Open held in Uberlandia, Brazil July 30–31, 2016 he was eliminated in the second round. Bourns was instrumental to bringing the first International Adaptive Standing Tennis Tournament to the United States, the USA TAP Open, where he was an organizer and player with Houston, Texas playing host. The USA TAP Open acted as a springboard to popularize the growth and development of a new modality of tennis for individuals in the United States and Internationally. His best International showing came at the Malmo Open, the largest Para-Sporting event in Europe, where he was a semi-finalist. In 2019 he played in his last tennis tournament at the Inaugural CAST Open in Greensboro, North Carolina where he was a finalist. Bourns retired from the TAP World Tour in 2019 ranked No. 4 in the world adaptive standing tennis rankings and top ranked American in his classification.

In a venture off of the court, Bourns has a cast and producing credit in the documentary film Tin Soldiers. The film is a look into the world of adaptive sports, where athletes with spina bifida, cerebral palsy, amputations or paralysis find new ways to enjoy the sports they love.

Bourns is a strong advocate for Adaptive Sport and physical activity for individuals with disabilities.

=== Partnerships ===
Bourns began his adaptive sporting journey with an athletic contract from Hanger Prosthetics and Orthotics in swimming and as a sprinter from 2000 to 2002. Kevin Carroll built his first sprinting prosthesis. He signed an athletic contract with New Life Brace and Limb in 2016. He served as a spokesperson for Valeo Cryotherapy and Physical Therapy from 2016 to 2018. Bourns became a Babolat endorsed athlete and brand ambassador in 2016.

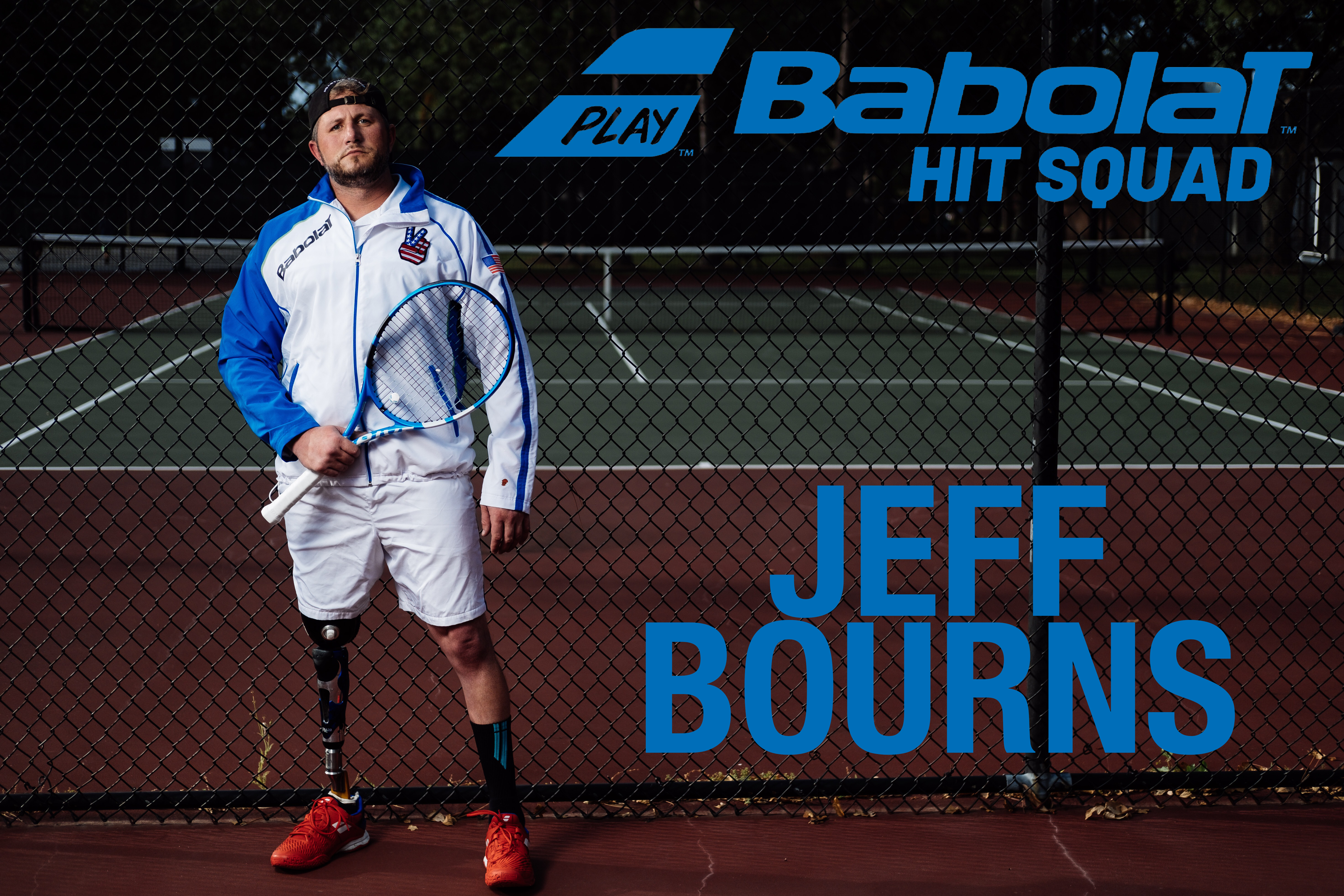
Bourns is a Babolat brand ambassador and athlete.

Wayne Luckett of Louisville Prosthetics and Orthotics contracted him to work with Special Olympic Tennis champion Dionte Foster in Louisville, Kentucky.
