= Bacliff, Texas =

- Census-designated place (CDP)
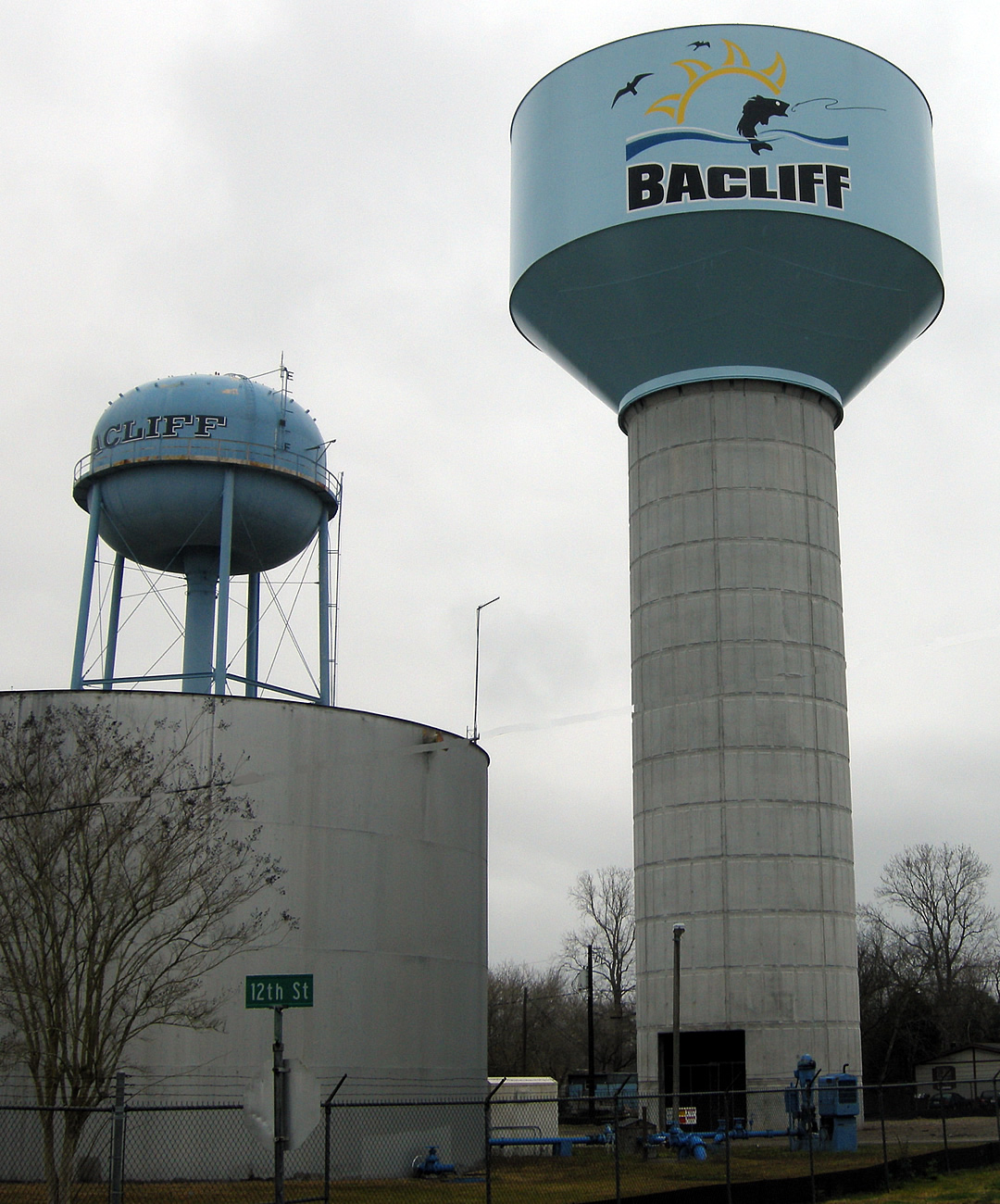
- Bacliff Water Tower

- Location of Bacliff, Texas
- Coordinates: 29°30′19″N 94°59′20″W
- Country: United States
- State: Texas
- County: Galveston

Area
  - Total: 2.7 sq mi (7.0 km^{2})
  - Land: 2.5 sq mi (6.6 km^{2})
  - Water: 0.15 sq mi (0.4 km^{2})
- Elevation: 16 ft (4.9 m)

Population (2020)
  - Total: 9,677
  - Density: 3,800/sq mi (1,500/km^{2})
- Time zone: UTC-6 (Central (CST))
  - Summer (DST): UTC-5 (CDT)
- ZIP code: 77518
- Area code: 281
- FIPS code: 48-05180
- GNIS feature ID: 2407791

Bacliff is a census-designated place (CDP) in north-central Galveston County, Texas, United States, 16 miles (26 km) northwest of Galveston. The population was 9,677 at the 2020 census, up from 8,619 at the 2010 census. Bacliff, originally called Clifton-by-the-Sea, began as a seaside resort town. Located on the western shore of Galveston Bay, Bacliff, along with San Leon and Bayview, are the largest unincorporated communities on the Galveston County mainland.

The Bacliff CDP is home to the Kenneth E. Little Elementary school and Bayshore Park, created from land donated by Texas Genco.

== History ==
Bacliff was established in 1910 by local landowners G.C. Perkins and W.Y. Fuqua as Clifton-by-the Sea. The area was developed as a seaside weekend resort, and included parks, hotels, summer homes, and a bathhouse and open air pavilion built on a pier over the water. Telephone service came to Clifton-by-the-Sea in 1913, and Grand Avenue (FM 646) became the main street. Hurricanes, Galveston's recovery after the Hurricane of 1900, and rapid transportation diminished Clifton-by-the-Sea's popularity.

The hurricane of 1915 destroyed many of the improvements to the area, but by 1924 the bathhouse and pavilion had been restored and summer residents returned to the community. A fire destroyed the pavilion in 1929 and it was rebuilt and hosted numerous summer concerts by both the Galveston and Houston orchestras. The hurricane of 1943 caused major damage to the area and the bathhouse and pavilion were not rebuilt.

In 1933, Clifton-by-the-Sea was home to 50 residents and two businesses, and from 1940 to 1949 it was home to 100 residents and four businesses. After World War II the area expanded as it became home for workers of the nearby petrochemical plants. The expansion of the area required the establishment of a post office in 1948. The U.S. Postal Service refused to allow the name Clifton-by-the-Sea to be used due to its length, and the name Clifton was already in use by another Texas town, so the residents chose the same name as the subdivision at the center of business, Bay Cliff, as a replacement. However, the name was misspelled on the postal paperwork as Bacliff. The new name had only seven letters, so it was admissible.

"Gator" Miller, former publisher of the Seabreeze, said that in the 1950s the Galveston Daily News bought a large parcel of land and awarded free lots to subscribers; people who canceled subscriptions lost their homesites, which were given to other subscribers. Miller said that this resulted in confused titles and a lack of large business; Miller said that a retailer would not wish to buy land in Bacliff and then discover that an individual claimed title to the land.

In 1964, Houston Lighting and Power began construction on two 450 MW electric generating units in Bacliff as part of the company's Project Enterprise expansion. The units were of supercritical boiler design, which was then a new technology. The power plant, originally known as the Bacliff Plant, was renamed the P. H. Robinson plant, in honor of company president Perk H. Robinson.

In the 1970s and 1980s, there was a dispute over the valuation of the power plant between HL&P and the Dickinson Independent School District (DISD). In 1979 HL&P said the plant was worth $238 million but DISD's board of equalization said it was worth over $242 million. A legal dispute ensued between the two agencies.

During the 1980s, three measures to incorporate the Bacliff area failed by wide margins. In April 1985, residents of Bacliff, Bayview, and San Leon considered an incorporation proposal to become the City of Bayshore. Judge Ray Holbrook signed an order for the election to take place on April 6, 1985, freeing the area, which had a population of 11,000, from the extraterritorial jurisdiction of League City and Texas City. Residents rejected the incorporation proposal. The vote was tallied with 1,268 against and 399 in favor. Proponents wanted a local police force and the ability to pass ordinances. Opponents said that the tax base was too small to support municipal services including police and road and drainage improvements.

By 1986, the community became a bedroom community for workers commuting to jobs in the area; during that year, the Bacliff community had 4,851 residents and 19 businesses.

In 1986, residents in Bacliff and Bayview considered incorporating into a general law city. Supporters said that incorporation would establish more local control over affairs, an area police department, and the ability to pass ordinances. Opponents said that the area's tax base could not sufficiently support municipal service, including police protection and road and drainage improvements. At the time the area of 3.6 square miles (9.3 km^{2}) considering incorporation had 7,000 people. Galveston County Judge Ray Holbrook signed an order setting the date of the election as Saturday, August 9, 1986, and releasing the area from the extraterritorial jurisdiction of Kemah, League City, and Texas City. In 1986, the Bacliff and Bayview area received water and sewer services from two municipal utility districts; if the incorporation measure had passed the districts would have likely remained. Donna Maples, vice president of the Bacliff-Bayview Community Association, supported the incorporation measure. The officials overseeing the election described turnout as "heavy." Officials announced that the incorporation proposal failed on a 770 to 163 count.

In 2000, in Bacliff there were 6,692 people organized into 2,523 households. That year Bacliff and San Leon formed a nine member board to prepare the communities for incorporation. At that time Bacliff and San Leon had a combined population of 10,000. The board was to have three members from the Bacliff area, three members from the San Leon area, and three at large members. It was prompted after the City of Texas City suddenly annexed several commercial parcels along Texas State Highway 146 between Kemah and Dickinson Bayou in the year 2000. The board hoped to convince Texas City to reverse the annexation.

In 2003, the P. H. Robinson power plant was mothballed by Texas Genco. The plant was mothballed due to the proliferation of newer gas-fired merchant plants in Texas. Robinson Units 1-4 had 2,213 MW. The plant was decommissioned in 2009 and demolished in 2012. In 2013, NRG began construction on a 6 unit electrical generation "peaking plant". This plant was placed in service on June 1, 2017

After Hurricane Ike hit Texas in September 2008, Galveston County officials offered a debris removal program to residents in unincorporated areas, including Bacliff. Flooding from hurricane Ike was minimized due in part to Bacliff's relatively high elevation of 16 feet.

In 2017, in Bacliff there were 10,925 people organized into 3,004 households.

== Geography and climate ==
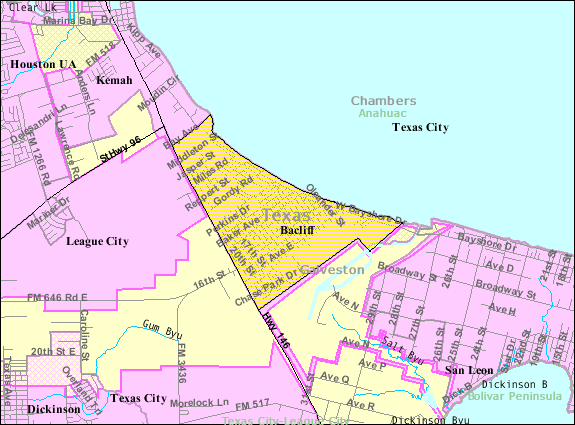
Map of the Bacliff CDP

Bacliff is a Census class code U5, populated area.

According to the United States Census Bureau, the CDP has a total area of 2.7 square miles (7.0 km^{2}), of which 2.5 square miles (6.6 km^{2}) is land and 0.15 square miles (0.4 km^{2}), or 5.85%, is water. Bacliff is east of League City, 3 miles (4.8 km) south of Kemah, 16 miles (26 km) northeast of Galveston, and 36 miles (58 km) southeast of Downtown Houston. Most of the area is along the Galveston Bay, east of Texas State Highway 146.

The Bacliff, San Leon, and Bayview communities form the "Bayshore" area.

Climate data for Bacliff, Texas
Month	Jan	Feb	Mar	Apr	May	Jun	Jul	Aug	Sep	Oct	Nov	Dec	Year
Mean daily maximum °F (°C)	62 (17)	66 (19)	72 (22)	77 (25)	84 (29)	89 (32)	91 (33)	92 (33)	88 (31)	81 (27)	72 (22)	65 (18)	78 (26)
Mean daily minimum °F (°C)	43 (6)	46 (8)	53 (12)	60 (16)	67 (19)	73 (23)	74 (23)	74 (23)	70 (21)	60 (16)	52 (11)	45 (7)	60 (15)
Average precipitation inches (mm)	4.76 (121)	2.91 (74)	3.11 (79)	3.22 (82)	4.92 (125)	5.35 (136)	4.78 (121)	3.84 (98)	7.12 (181)	3.93 (100)	4.43 (113)	3.36 (85)	51.73 (1,315)
Source: Weather.com

== Demographics ==
Historical population
Census	Pop.	Note	%±
1980	4,851		—
1990	5,549		14.4%
2000	6,962		25.5%
2010	8,619		23.8%
2020	9,677		12.3%
U.S. Decennial Census; 1850–1900 1910; 1920 1930 1940; 1950 1960 1970; 1980 1990 2000; 2010

Bacliff first appeared as a census designated place in the 1980 United States census.

=== 2020 census ===
Bacliff CDP, Texas – Racial and ethnic composition Note: the US Census treats Hispanic/Latino as an ethnic category. This table excludes Latinos from the racial categories and assigns them to a separate category. Hispanics/Latinos may be of any race.
Race / Ethnicity (NH = Non-Hispanic)	Pop 2000	Pop 2010	Pop 2020	% 2000	% 2010	% 2020
White alone (NH)	4,897	4,741	4,606	70.34%	55.01%	47.60%
Black or African American alone (NH)	123	283	486	1.77%	3.28%	5.02%
Native American or Alaska Native alone (NH)	32	46	40	0.46%	0.53%	0.41%
Asian alone (NH)	203	237	223	2.92%	2.75%	2.30%
Native Hawaiian or Pacific Islander alone (NH)	1	6	0	0.01%	0.07%	0.00%
Other race alone (NH)	2	20	16	0.03%	0.23%	0.17%
Mixed race or Multiracial (NH)	82	90	344	1.18%	1.04%	3.55%
Hispanic or Latino (any race)	1,622	3,196	3,962	23.30%	37.08%	40.94%
Total	6,962	8,619	9,677	100.00%	100.00%	100.00%

As of the 2020 United States census, there were 9,677 people, 3,672 households, and 2,684 families residing in the CDP.

=== 2010 census ===
As of the census of 2010, there were 8,619 people, 3,022 households, and 2,095 families residing in the CDP. This represented a growth of approximately 23.8% since the 2000 census. The population density was 3,405.4 people per square mile. The racial makeup of the CDP was 74.3% White, 3.5% African American, 0.7% Native American, 2.8% Asian, 0.1% Pacific Islander, 15.9% from other races, and 2.7% from two or more races. Hispanic or Latino of any race were 37.1% of the population.

There were 3,022 households, out of which 34.3% had children under the age of 18 living with them, 47.9% were married couples living together, 14.2% had a female householder with no husband present, and 30.7% were non-families. 24.1% of all households were made up of individuals, and 6.9% had someone living alone who was 65 years of age or older. The average household size was 2.87 and the average family size was 3.41.

In the CDP, the population was spread out, with 18.7% under the age of 18 years, 7.5% from 18 to 24 years, 31.3% from 25 to 44 years, 22.5% from 45 to 64, and 8.8% who were 65 years of age or older. The median age was 32.6 years. For every 100 females, there were 100.3 males.

As of 2012 most residents of Bacliff are commuters. As of 2012 Bacliff, Bayview, and San Leon together make up the largest unincorporated community in the mainland portion of Galveston County by population.

In 2008 Phale Cassady Le, an outreach coordinator of Boat People SOS Houston, said that in Bacliff and San Leon there were between 150 and 200 Vietnamese families with origins in crab, oyster, and shrimp fishing operations. According to Le, most of the Vietnamese have no house or boat insurance, and even if they did have this insurance, their English is not well developed enough to read the terms of the policies. Many families had hand-made boats that were constructed over several years as the owner made more and more money. Nick Cenegy of The Galveston County Daily News said that the Vietnamese community in Bacliff and San Leon had a "tradition of self-reliance and wariness of outsiders."

The Vietnamese first moved into the Galveston Bay Area in the 1970s and established shrimping businesses with borrowed money. By the early 1980s, many native residents in the area became angered and a conflict started between the groups. Because media groups portrayed White residents as, in the words of Bob Burtman of the Houston Press, "bigoted rednecks," many residents had a suspicion of the media; Burtman said that the media had exaggerated the importance of Ku Klux Klan involvement in that conflict. Due to the conflict, local residents had also gained anti-government feelings that were present in 1997. That year, Burtman said "For the most part, the Vietnamese and Texan shrimpers have ironed out their differences, though mistrust remains."

== Crime ==
As of 2008 (Originally started in 1995), Bacliff had the 4th Street Bloods (4SB), a street gang consisting of mostly White Americans. The name of the gang originates from its headquarters in Bacliff. Documents filed in federal court stated that the gang was formed by six people in the mid-1990s. Cindy George of the Houston Chronicle said "The gang purportedly makes money by selling powdered and crack cocaine as well as methamphetamine." To identify themselves, members wore red and had tattoos that read "4th Street Playa" and "Kliff Side".

In 2008 the Federal Bureau of Investigation (FBI) Texas City Safe Street Task Force, the Galveston County Sheriff's Office, and other agencies started an investigation into the gang. That year, 10 people were arrested, accused of drug charges. In 2011 the Federal Government of the United States arrested four men from Bacliff, accusing to be a part of the gang and charging them crimes related to crack cocaine distribution. In 2011 12 people accused of being members faced drug charges. In 2012 a federal judge in Houston sentenced four 4SB men to prison. They had pleaded guilty to their crimes.

== Infrastructure ==
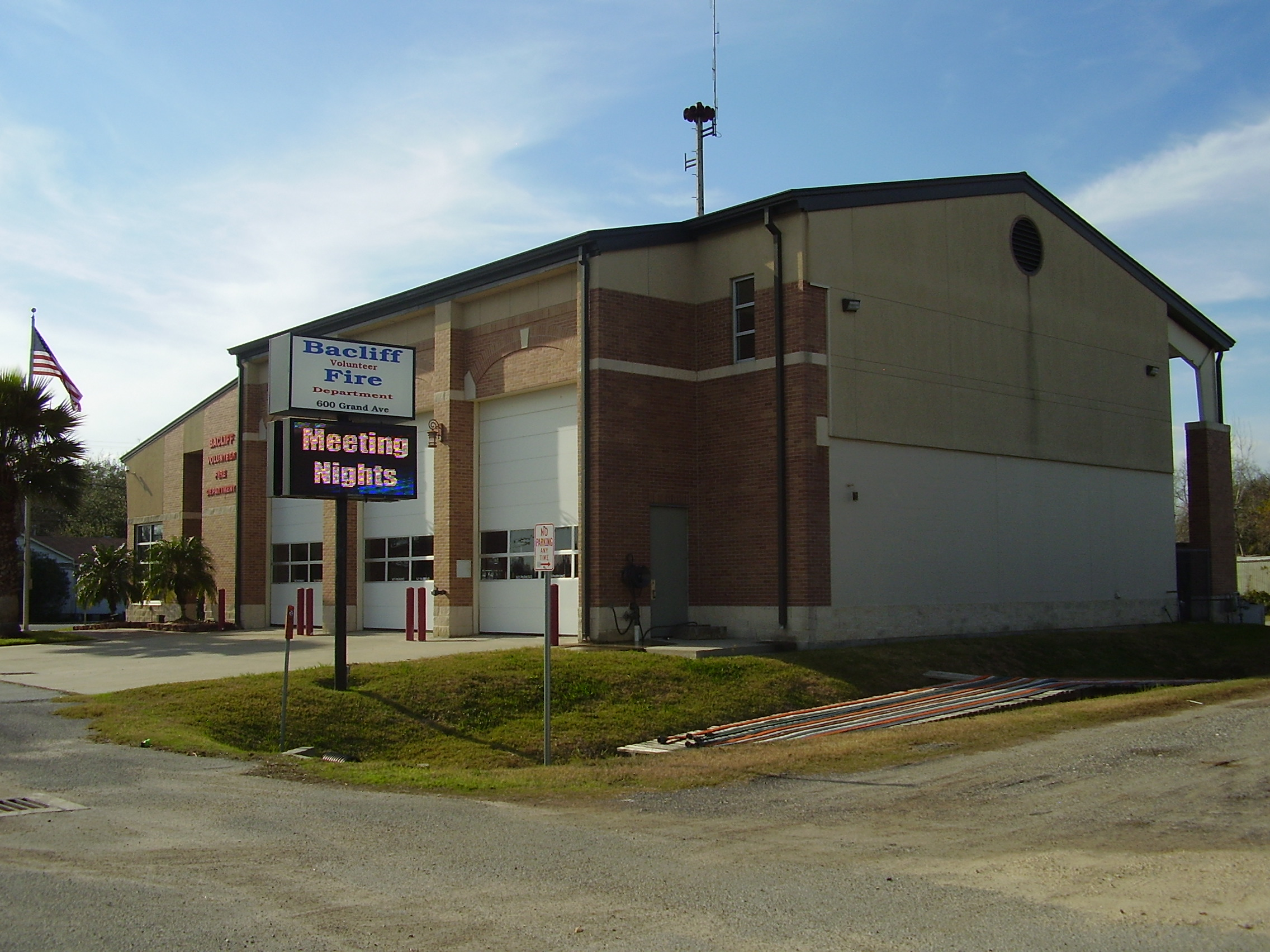
Bacliff Volunteer Fire Department

=== Utilities ===
Two municipal utility districts serve the Bacliff CDP. Some sections of the Bacliff CDP are served by the Bacliff Municipal Utility District (MUD), while other sections are served by the Bayview MUD. In November 2011 the Bacliff MUD requested and received an 8.95 million dollar bond issue for the expansion of water services which are currently provided to about 2,700 water taps. This bond issue will be funded by Bacliff residents through increased property taxes. In addition to water/sewer service, the Bacliff MUD became responsible for administering trash collection as of February 2016. The Bacliff Volunteer Fire Department provides fire protection services. In 2010, under the American Recovery and Reinvestment Act, the fire department got a $356,320 loan and a $191,854 grant from the United States Department of Agriculture Rural Development. The department used it to buy a newly built pumper fire truck.

As of January 2014 Bacliff resident James Wistinghausen was the General Manager of the Bacliff MUD and the Fire Chief for the Bacliff Volunteer Fire Department.

=== County, state, and federal representation ===
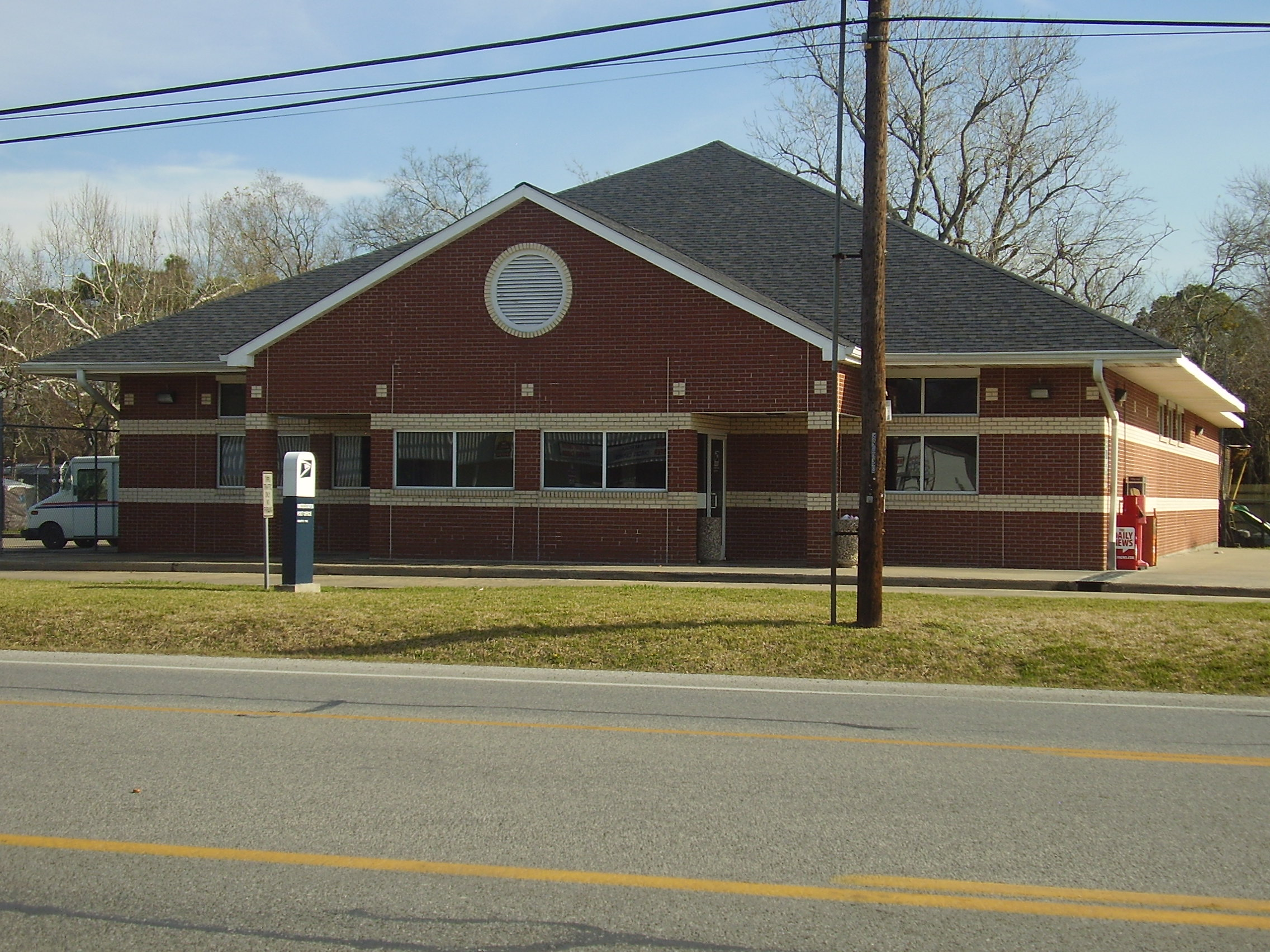
Bacliff US Post Office

The community is within the boundaries of Galveston County Commissioners' Court Precinct 1. As of 2017, Darrell Apffel is the Commissioner of the precinct. The Galveston County Sheriff's Office is the primary provider of law enforcement for Bacliff. In November 2012, Rick Sharp was elected constable of Precinct 1, replacing Pam Matranga. The Galveston County Precinct 1 Justice of the Peace court is located in Bacliff; as of April, 2015, the Justice of the Peace was Alison Cox. On January 26, 2016, a new Law Enforcement Center, located on Grand Avenue at 12th St, was opened. This building was a former illegal gambling hall and was confiscated by Galveston County, it now serves as a local base of operations for the Galveston County Sheriff's Department and Galveston County Precinct 1 Constable's office.

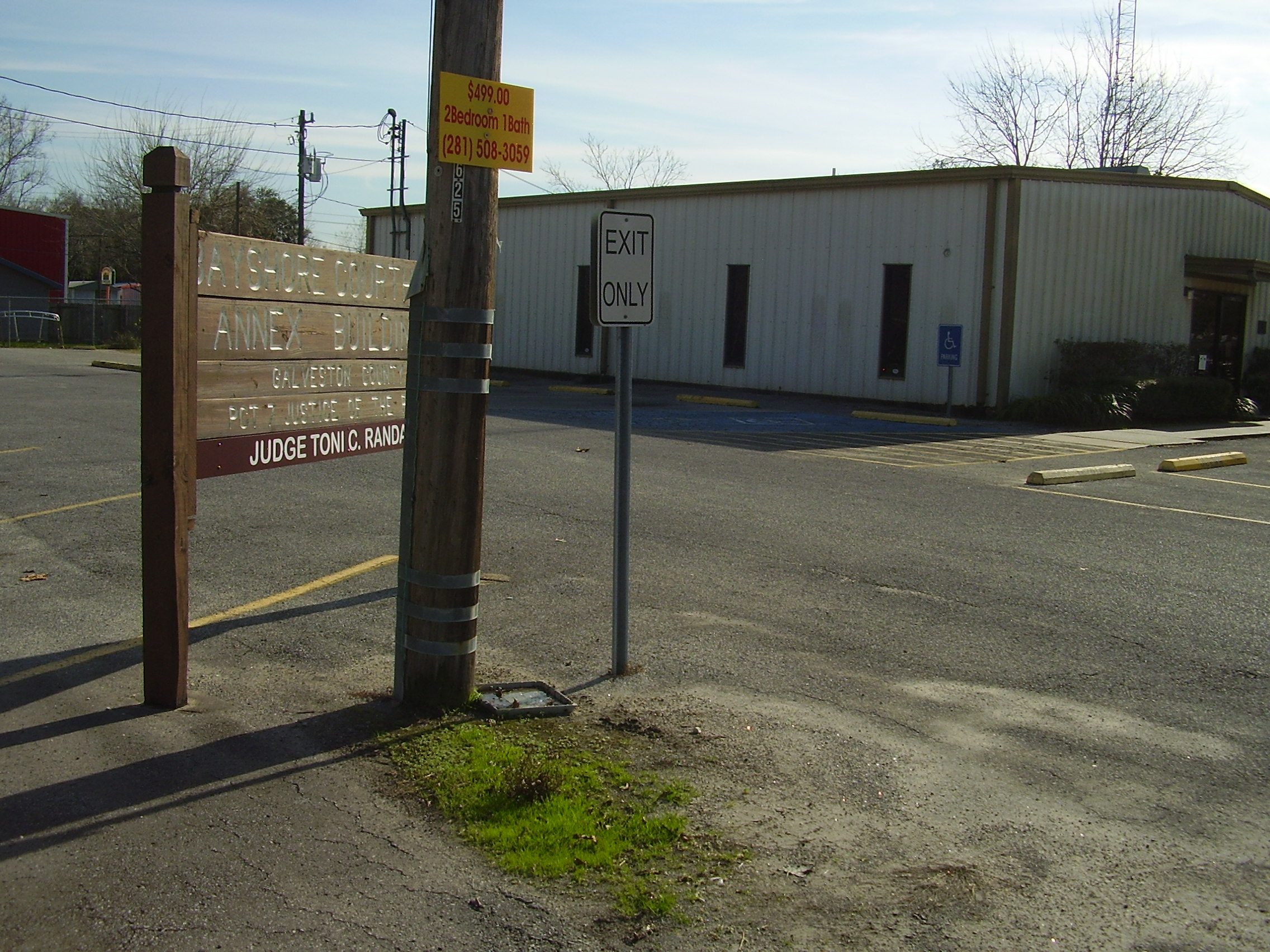
Bayshore Courthouse Annex Building

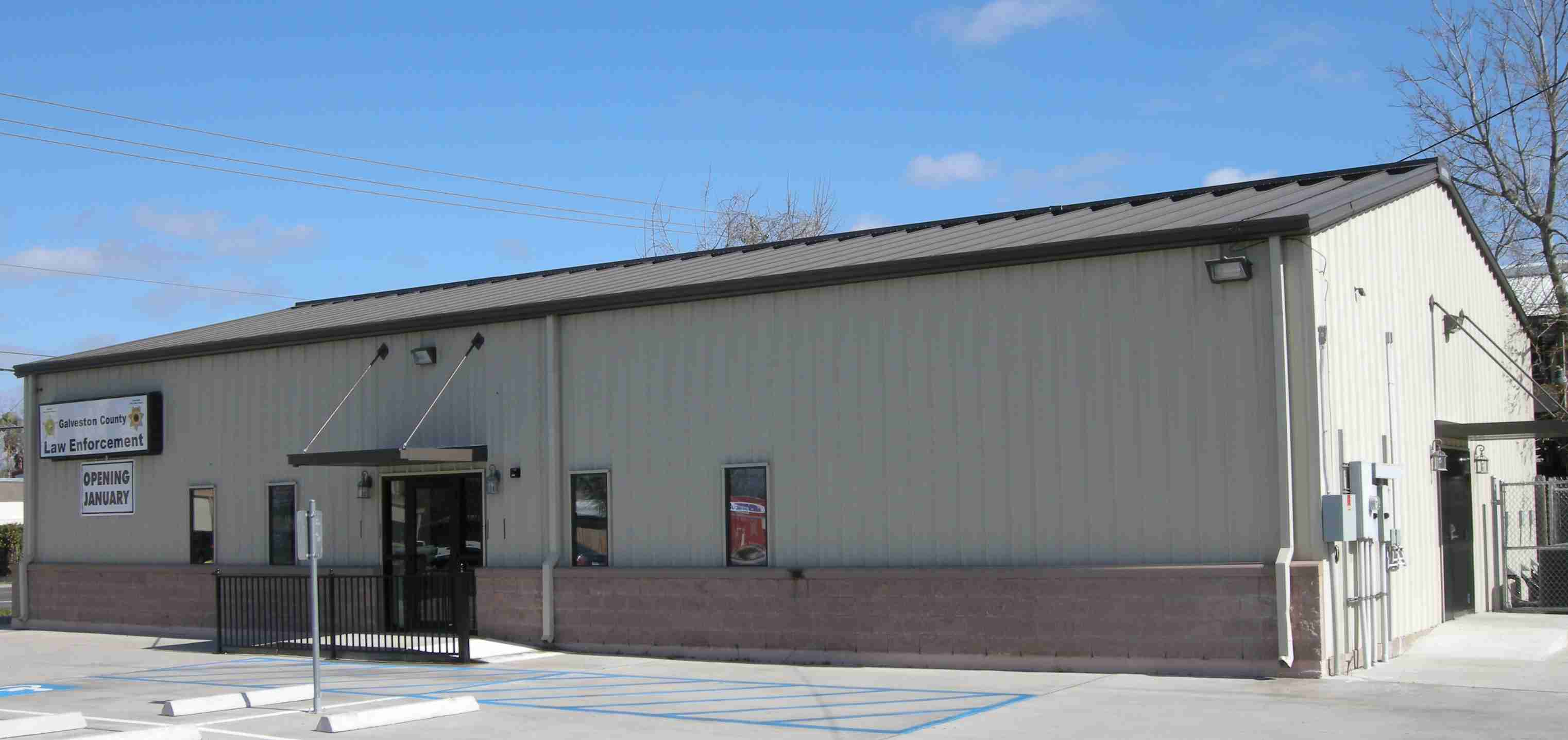
Bacliff Law Enforcement Center

Bacliff is located in District 23 of the Texas House of Representatives. As of 2016, Wayne Faircloth represents the district. Bacliff is within District 11 of the Texas Senate; as of 2016 Larry Taylor represents that district. In 1992, Bacliff was within District 24 of the Texas House of Representatives; after statewide legislative redistricting District 24 became District 23 in 1993 with its boundary changing by several city blocks.

Bacliff is in Texas's 14th Congressional district. As of 2016, Randy Weber represents the district. The United States Postal Service Bacliff Post Office is located at 415 Grand Avenue.

Unincorporated areas in Galveston County receive animal services from the Galveston County Animal Resource Center, an animal shelter operated by the Galveston County Health District in Texas City.

Unincorporated areas in Galveston County receive emergency medical services from the Galveston Area Ambulance Authority (GAAA), also operated by the health district.

In 1994 Republican Party strength grew in Bacliff.

=== Media ===
Bacliff has one local tabloid which has been published in Bacliff and distributed free of charge since 1986, The Eagle Point Press Also circulated in Bacliff, between 2008 and 2018, on a monthly basis is The Seabreeze News, which is published in San Leon

== Economy ==
Bacliff, like San Leon, and Bayview, originated as a fishing community. In 2012 T.J. Aulds of the Galveston County Daily News stated that much of the area's economic influence moved to the corridor along Texas State Highway 146, and that the economy adjusted with the growth of retail food service outlets and bars. Like San Leon and Bayview, many residents in Bacliff commute to work in Houston.

== Education ==
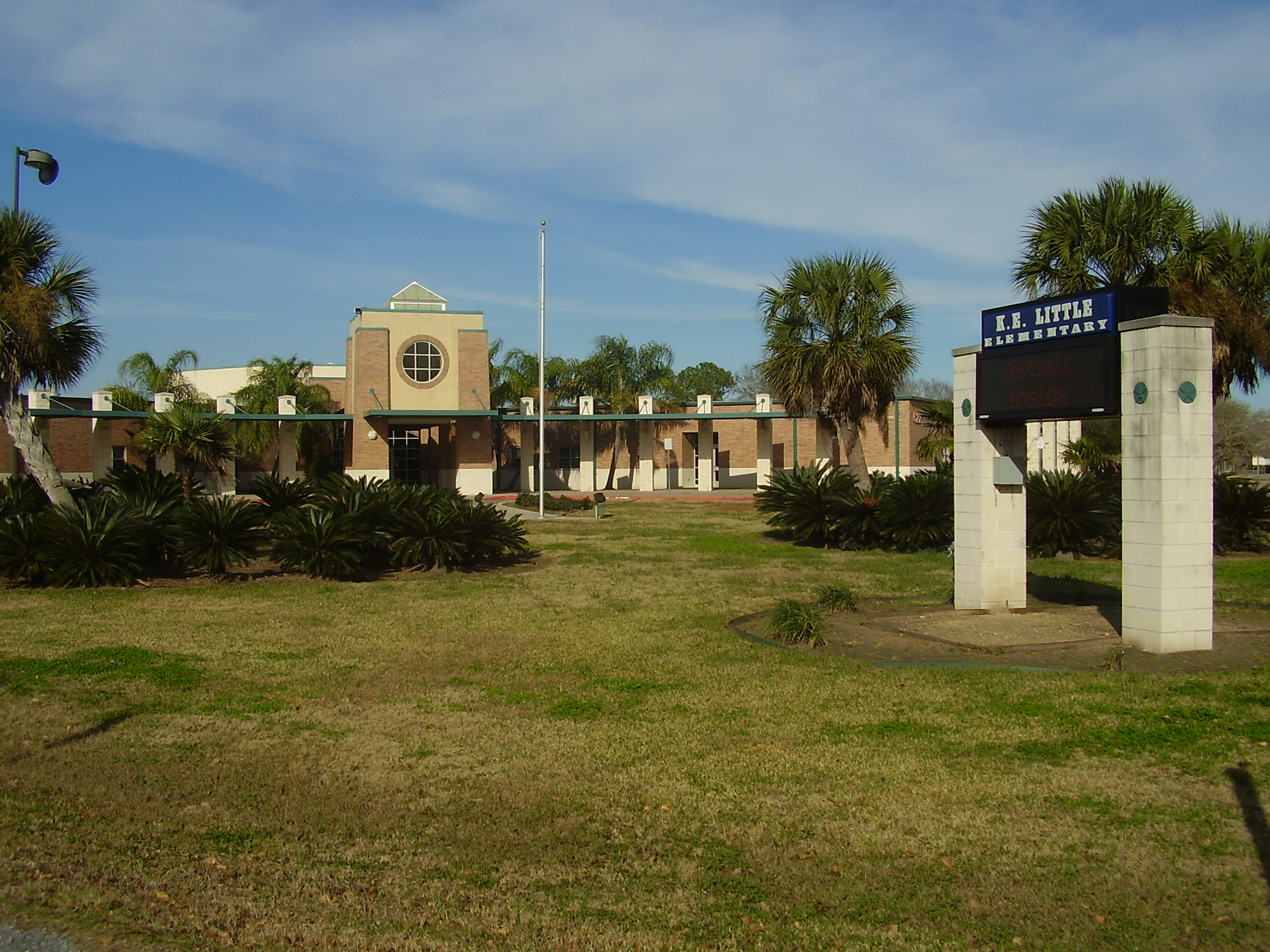
Kenneth E. Little Elementary School

Some of the areas within the Bacliff CDP fall under the boundary of Dickinson Independent School District (DISD), while northern areas are zoned to Clear Creek Independent School District (CCISD).

The DISD portion is zoned to Kenneth E. Little Elementary School in Bacliff. The current 92,000-square-foot (8,500 m^{2}) facility, on a 20-acre (8.1 ha) campus, has 33 classrooms and capacity for about 750 students. The architect of the building was Bay Architects and the construction company was Falcon Group Construction. Construction began in the year 2000 and completion was scheduled for June 2001. The cost was $7.5 million. Classrooms are arranged in pods organized by grade level. Each pod has a commons area. The school has a lighthouse motif reflecting its proximity to the Galveston Bay. The school entrance has a frosted dome, pyramidal skylight. The previous school building was located on the same site. Portions of the original building were to be demolished after students moved into the new school facility.

Residents of the DISD portion are also zoned to Barber Middle School in Dickinson, McAdams Junior High School in Dickinson, and Dickinson High School in Dickinson. CCISD pupils are zoned to Stewart Elementary School (formerly Kemah Elementary School) in unincorporated Galveston County, Bayside Intermediate School in League City, and Clear Falls High School in League City. Previously residents were zoned to League City Intermediate School, and Clear Creek High School in League City.

Residents of Dickinson ISD and the Galveston County portion of Clear Creek ISD (and therefore Bacliff) are zoned to the College of the Mainland, a community college in Texas City.

== Parks and recreation ==
Along the Galveston Bay Bacliff has several boat ramps.

The Galveston County Department of Parks and Senior Services operates several recreational facilities in Bacliff. The Bacliff Community Center is at 4503 11th Street. The 28-acre (110,000 m^{2}) Bayshore Park at 5437 East Farm to Market Road 646 (FM 646) has five baseball fields, one boat ramp, one historic site, ten picnic areas, one pier, one playground, and five practice backstops. The 25-acre (10 ha) park was originally owned by Texas Genco for 35 years; the county operated the park according to an agreement. In 2005 Texas Genco donated the park to the county. Many anglers and their families use Bayshore Park as a place of recreation.

In 2014 Galveston County purchased and cleared a new 64-acre (26 ha) tract in Bacliff which will become a new park for the Bayshore area. In August 2016 the Galveston County Commissioners Court approved a $1.9 million contract to build a Community Center at the park with Galveston County crews initiating construction the same month. As of January 2018 the new Bacliff Community Center and Park was in full operation.

The Bacliff Boat Ramp is located behind Clifton's Seaside Diner, while the Bayshore Park Boat Ramp is located on Farm to Market Road 646, aka Bayshore Drive. The nearest full service marina is the Eagle Point fishing camp, located off East Bayshore Drive in San Leon.

As of 2016 one of the most popular restaurants in Bacliff was Noah's Ark. T.J. Aulds of The Galveston County Daily News said that Bacliff, San Leon, and Bayview "are known for great spots to eat seafood."

As of 1991 Bacliff, along with Kemah and Seabrook, houses pleasure boats from NASA employees due to its proximity to the Lyndon B. Johnson Space Center.

== Notable person ==
- Floyd Tillman, country musician who contributed to the creation of Western swing
