= Keith Cooper Jr. =

American football player (born 2003)

Keith Cooper
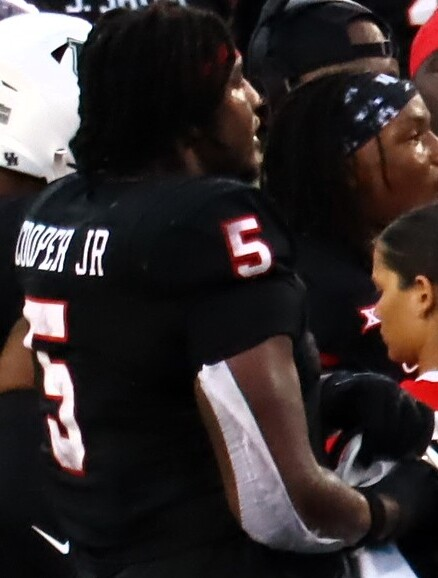
- Cooper in 2024

No. 97 – Miami Dolphins
- Position: Defensive end
- Roster status: Active

Personal information
- Born: March 30, 2003 (age 23); Houston, Texas, U.S.
- Listed height: 6 ft 5 in (1.96 m)
- Listed weight: 285 lb (129 kg)

Career information
- High school: Dickinson (Dickinson, Texas)
- College: Tulane (2021–2023); Houston (2024)
- NFL draft: 2025: undrafted

Career history
- Detroit Lions (2025)*; Cleveland Browns (2025); Miami Dolphins (2026); Carolina Panthers (2026)*; Miami Dolphins (2026–present)
- * Offseason or practice squad member only

Awards and highlights
- Second team All-Big 12 (2024)

Career NFL statistics as of Week 3, 2026
- Games played: 4
- Total tackles: 1
- Stats at Pro Football Reference

Keith Cooper Jr. (born March 30, 2003) is an American professional football defensive end for the Miami Dolphins of the National Football League (NFL). He played college football for the Houston Cougars and for the Tulane Green Wave.

== Early life ==
Cooper attended high school at Dickinson located in Dickinson, Texas. Coming out of high school, he was rated as a three-star recruit, where he committed to play college football for the Tulane Green Wave.

== College career ==
=== Tulane ===
During his three-year career at Tulane from 2021 through 2023, he recorded 73 tackles with 17 being for a loss, 10.5 sacks, and a forced fumble. After the conclusion of the 2023 season, Cooper decided to enter his name into the NCAA transfer portal.

=== Houston ===
Cooper transferred to play for the Houston Cougars. During his one season at Houston in 2024, he totaled 46 tackles with nine being for a loss, three and a half sacks, and 29 pressures. For his performance during the 2024 season, Cooper was named second-team all-Big 12.

== Professional career ==
Pre-draft measurables
Height	Weight	Arm length	Hand span	Wingspan	40-yard dash	10-yard split	20-yard split	20-yard shuttle	Three-cone drill	Vertical jump	Broad jump	Bench press
6 ft 3 in (1.91 m)	280 lb (127 kg)	34 7/8 in (0.89 m)	10 3/4 in (0.27 m)	6 ft 11 3/4 in (2.13 m)	5.08 s	1.70 s	2.94 s	4.73 s	7.51 s	30.0 in (0.76 m)	9 ft 6 in (2.90 m)	24 reps
All values from Pro Day

=== Detroit Lions ===
After not being selected in the 2025 NFL draft, Cooper signed with the Detroit Lions as an undrafted free agent. Heading into the 2025 season, he was one of the team's top UDFA's, where he competed for a 53-man roster spot. He was waived on August 26 as part of final roster cuts, and re-signed to the practice squad. Cooper was released on October 16.

=== Cleveland Browns ===
On December 9, 2025, Cooper signed with the Cleveland Browns' practice squad.

=== Miami Dolphins ===
On January 9, 2026, Cooper signed a reserve/futures contract with the Miami Dolphins. On September 28, he was waived and re-signed to the practice squad two days later. On October 8, Cooper was released.

=== Carolina Panthers ===
On October 12, 2026, Cooper signed with the Carolina Panthers practice squad.

=== Miami Dolphins (second stint) ===
On November 11, 2026, Cooper was signed by the Miami Dolphins off of the Panthers practice squad.
