= San Leon, Texas =

- Census-designated place (CDP)
- Location of San Leon, Texas

- Location within Texas Location within the United States
- Coordinates: 29°29′42″N 94°56′38″W
- Country: United States
- State: Texas
- County: Galveston

Area
  - Total: 5.2 sq mi (13.4 km^{2})
  - Land: 4.9 sq mi (12.6 km^{2})
  - Water: 0.27 sq mi (0.7 km^{2})
- Elevation: 3 ft (0.91 m)

Population (2020)
  - Total: 6,135
  - Density: 1,260/sq mi (487/km^{2})
- Time zone: UTC-6 (Central (CST))
  - Summer (DST): UTC-5 (CDT)
- ZIP code: 77539-2492
- Area code: 281
- FIPS code: 48-65564
- GNIS feature ID: 2409259

San Leon is a census-designated place (CDP) in Galveston County, Texas, United States. The population was 6,135 at the 2020 census.

== History ==
During the early 19th century, the pirate Jean Lafitte, who ruled Galveston Island, established a stronghold at Eagle Point in modern San Leon. Eagle Point went on to become an important shipping and trading post for slaves. A community was established, known as Edward's Point and later North Galveston. When the North Galveston, Houston, and Kansas City Railroad was built through the area in 1893, the town began to develop as a commercial center. However, following the hurricanes in 1900 and 1915, the town was devastated and never able to fully recover. Attempts were made in the early 20th century to establish a resort community in the area, but these efforts met with only modest success. Growth and development since this time have been relatively stagnant.

The San Leon Municipal Utility District (MUD) was created by an Act of the 1965 Texas Legislature with all the powers of a Texas Conservation and Reclamation District, a Municipal Corporation and a Water Control and Improvement District (WCID).

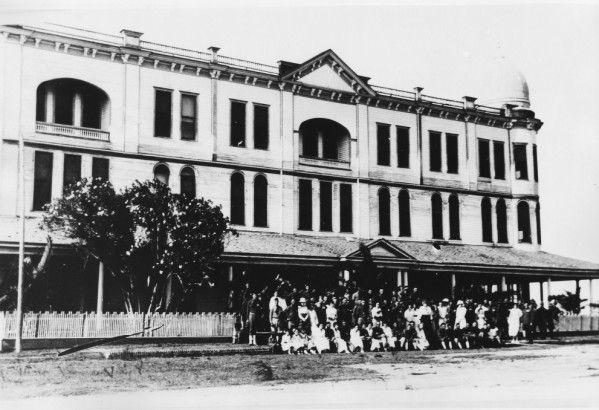
San Leon Motel

In April 1985, residents of San Leon, Bacliff and Bayview considered an incorporation proposal to become the City of Bayshore. Judge Ray Holbrook signed an order for the election to take place on April 6, 1985, freeing the area, which had a population of 11,000, from the extraterritorial jurisdiction of League City and Texas City. Residents rejected the incorporation proposal. The vote was tallied with 1,268 against and 399 in favor. Proponents wanted a local police force and the ability to pass ordinances. Opponents said that the tax base was too small to support municipal services including police and road and drainage improvements.

San Leon was not in a 1986 proposal to incorporate that included Bacliff and Bayview. Donna Maples, vice president of the Bacliff - Bayview Community Association, said that historically, San Leon had generated most of the opposition to incorporation proposals. She said, "In the past, San Leon has shown it is not interested in incorporation. So this time we decided not to include them. They don't have as much in common as we do."

On April 23, 1991, the community, and other areas of Galveston County, received an enhanced 9-1-1 system which routes calls to proper dispatchers and allows dispatchers to automatically view the address of the caller. On September 13, 2008, San Leon, TX received extensive damage from Hurricane Ike.

In 2000, there were 4,365 people organized into 1,815 households. That year, Bacliff and San Leon formed a nine-member board to prepare the communities for incorporation. At that time, Bacliff and San Leon had a combined population of 10,000. The board was to have three members from the Bacliff area, three members from the San Leon area, and three at-large members. It was prompted after the City of Texas City suddenly annexed several commercial parcels along Texas State Highway 146 between Kemah and Dickinson Bayou in 2000. The board hoped to convince Texas City to reverse the annexation.

In 2012, the P.H. Robinson electric generation plant formerly operated by Texas Genco, located in the area, was demolished. In November 2025 the plants five (5) remaining cooling towers caught fire and burned to the ground.

== Geography ==
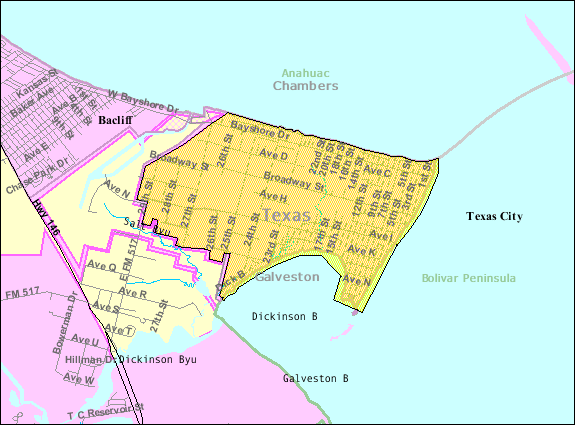
Map of the San Leon CDP

According to the United States Census Bureau, the CDP has a total area of 5.2 sq mi (13 km^{2}), of which 4.9 sq mi (13 km^{2}) is land and 0.3 sq mi (0.78 km^{2}), or 5.61%, is covered by water.

The Bacliff, San Leon, and Bayview communities form the "Bayshore" area.

Shore erosion had affected San Leon. Avenue A was built along the north shore. By 1997, it was no longer contiguous because portions had been destroyed by erosion.

Effective August 15, 2019 Galveston County Commissioners Court approved revised Federal Emergency Management Agency flood plain maps which categorized the vast majority of San Leon as being at high risk from floods.

== Demographics ==
Historical population
Census	Pop.	Note	%±
1980	1,745		—
1990	3,328		90.7%
2000	4,365		31.2%
2010	4,970		13.9%
2020	6,135		23.4%
U.S. Decennial Census; 1850–1900 1910; 1920 1930 1940; 1950 1960 1970; 1980 1990 2000; 2010

San Leon first appeared as a census designated place in the 1980 United States census.

=== 2020 census ===
San Leon CDP, Texas – Racial and ethnic composition Note: the US Census treats Hispanic/Latino as an ethnic category. This table excludes Latinos from the racial categories and assigns them to a separate category. Hispanics/Latinos may be of any race.
Race / Ethnicity (NH = Non-Hispanic)	Pop 2000	Pop 2010	Pop 2020	% 2000	% 2010	% 2020
White alone (NH)	3,270	3,408	3,504	74.91%	68.57%	57.11%
Black or African American alone (NH)	35	35	109	0.80%	0.70%	1.78%
Native American or Alaska Native alone (NH)	33	35	27	0.76%	0.70%	0.44%
Asian alone (NH)	327	281	164	7.49%	5.65%	2.67%
Native Hawaiian or Pacific Islander alone (NH)	3	0	0	0.07%	0.00%	0.00%
Other race alone (NH)	8	1	18	0.18%	0.02%	0.29%
Mixed race or Multiracial (NH)	62	54	239	1.42%	1.09%	3.90%
Hispanic or Latino (any race)	627	1,156	2,074	14.36%	23.26%	33.81%
Total	4,365	4,970	6,135	100.00%	100.00%	100.00%

As of the 2020 United States census, there were 6,135 people, 2,276 households, and 1,649 families residing in the CDP.

=== 2010 census ===
As of the census of 2010, 4,970 people, 1,815 households, and 1,121 families resided in the CDP. The population density was 894.1 inhabitants per square mile (345.2/km^{2}). The 2,293 housing units averaged 469.7 per square mile (181.4/km^{2}). The racial makeup of the CDP was 80.41% White, 0.80% African American, 0.82% Native American, 7.61% Asian, 0.11% Pacific Islander, 8.27% from other races, and 1.97% from two or more races. Hispanics or Latinos of any race were 14.36% of the population.

Of the 1,815 households, 25.1% had children under the age of 18 living with them, 48.6% were married couples living together, 7.3% had a female householder with no husband present, and 38.2% were not families. About 30.0% of all households were made up of individuals, and 8.5% had someone living alone who was 65 years of age or older. The average household size was 2.39 and the average family size was 2.99.

In the CDP, the population was spread out, with 23.0% under the age of 18, 7.4% from 18 to 24, 30.8% from 25 to 44, 28.5% from 45 to 64, and 10.3% who were 65 years of age or older. The median age was 39 years. For every 100 females, there were 110.4 males. For every 100 females age 18 and over, there were 112.8 males.

The median income for a household in the CDP was $31,687, and for a family was $40,656. Males had a median income of $32,574 versus $25,526 for females. The per capita income for the CDP was $19,422. About 14.8% of families and 19.7% of the population were below the poverty line, including 33.5% of those under age 18 and 2.3% of those age 65 or over.

As of 1986, the community is primarily residential. During weekends and summer, many people stayed in their cottages and small houses.

As of 2012, San Leon, Bayview, and Bacliff together make up the largest unincorporated community in the mainland portion of Galveston County by population. As of July 2019 the San Leon CDP included 2632 single family residences, 14 multi-family residences and 2116 vacant lots which provided a tax base of $369,924,758.

In 2008, Phale Cassady Le, an outreach coordinator of Boat People SOS Houston, said that in San Leon and Bacliff, between 150 and 200 Vietnamese families were involved with crab-, oyster-, and shrimp-fishing operations. According to Le, most of the Vietnamese have no house or boat insurance, and even if they did have this insurance, their English is not well developed enough to read the terms of the policies. Many families had hand-made boats that were constructed over several years as the owner made more and more money. Nick Cenegy of The Galveston County Daily News said that the Vietnamese community in San Leon and Bacliff had a "tradition of self-reliance and wariness of outsiders."

In 2017 there were 4,890 people organized into 2,036 households.

== Economy ==
The most significant sector of the community's economy is oyster and shrimp fishing. Many homes in the community are second homes used as summer residences. Like Bacliff and Bayview, many residents in San Leon commute to work in Houston.

== Government ==
San Leon CDP is located within Galveston County Precinct 1 and is represented in Galveston County Commissioners Court by the Honorable Darrell A. Apffel who was elected November 8, 2016. San Leon voters reside within Galveston County Voting Precinct 151.

== Education ==
San Leon students are zoned to schools in the Dickinson Independent School District.

San Leon Elementary School opened in the beginning of the 2007–2008 school year, and serves residents from kindergarten through fourth grade.

Barber Middle School in Dickinson serves the fifth and sixth grades. McAdams Junior High School in Dickinson serves grades 7 and 8. Students are zoned to Dickinson High School for grades 9 through 12.

== Infrastructure ==
The San Leon Water Control and Improvement District (WCID) provides water services. The political entity San Leon MUD (WCID) was organized in 1965 and is regulated by the state of Texas as a Water Control and Improvement District (WCID).

The San Leon Post Office was damaged and not replaced after Hurricane Ike in 2008.

In February 2025 the WCID cancelled its fire services contract with the San Leon VFD due to failure by the VFD to provide its 2023 audited financial report.

Unincorporated areas in Galveston County receive animal services from the Galveston County Animal Resource Center, an animal shelter operated by the Galveston County Health District in Texas City.

Unincorporated areas in Galveston County receive emergency medical services from the Galveston Area Ambulance Authority (GAAA), also operated by the health district.
