= Dickinson Independent School District =

School district in Texas, United States

Address
- 2218 East FM 517 Dickinson, Texas, 77539; United States

District information
- Type: Public
- Grades: PK–12
- Superintendent: Carla Voelkel
- Schools: 19
- NCES District ID: 4817070

Students and staff
- Students: 12,592 (2023–2024)
- Teachers: 871.29 (on an FTE basis) (2023–2024)
- Staff: 977.65 (on an FTE basis) (2023–2024)
- Student–teacher ratio: 14.45 (2023–2024)

Other information
- Website: dickinsonisd.org

Dickinson Independent School District is a school district based in Dickinson, Texas, United States in Greater Houston.

DISD serves most of the city of Dickinson as well as portions of the cities of La Marque, League City, and Texas City and some houses in unincorporated Galveston County (including most of Bacliff and all of San Leon).

All of the DISD catchment area is also served by the College of the Mainland.

In 2009, the school district was rated "academically acceptable" by the Texas Education Agency.

== History ==
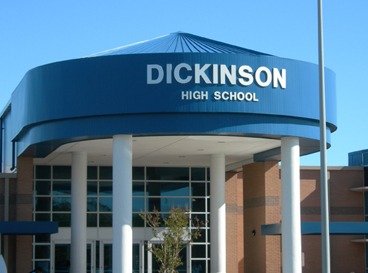
Dickinson High School

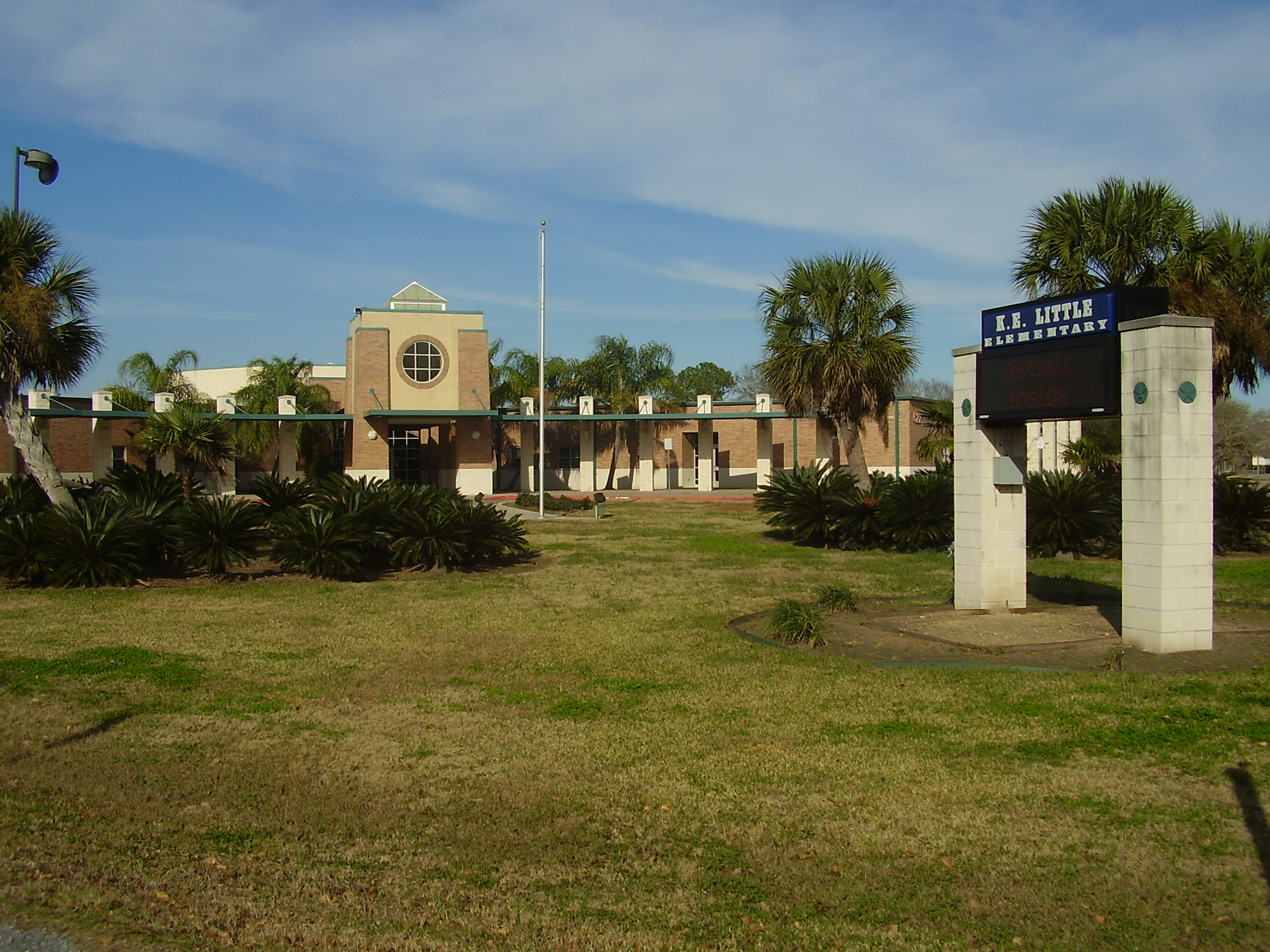
Kenneth E. Little Elementary School in Bacliff

In the 2000s, rising real estate costs in Galveston, alongside the devastation brought by Hurricane Ike, forced many families to move to other areas, including League City and Texas City. This meant an influx of children out of Galveston ISD and into other school districts like Dickinson ISD.

== Standardized dress ==
All DISD students were required to wear "standardized dress", which is similar to school uniforms. In 2014 DISD did away with the standardized dress code.

== Schools ==
=== Secondary schools ===
High schools

- Dickinson High School 9-12

Junior high schools

- Dickinson Junior High (Texas City) 7-8
- McAdams Junior High School (Dickinson) 7-8
- Kranz Junior High School Named after Gene Kranz former NASA flight director who is a longtime resident of the city. 7-8

=== Primary schools ===
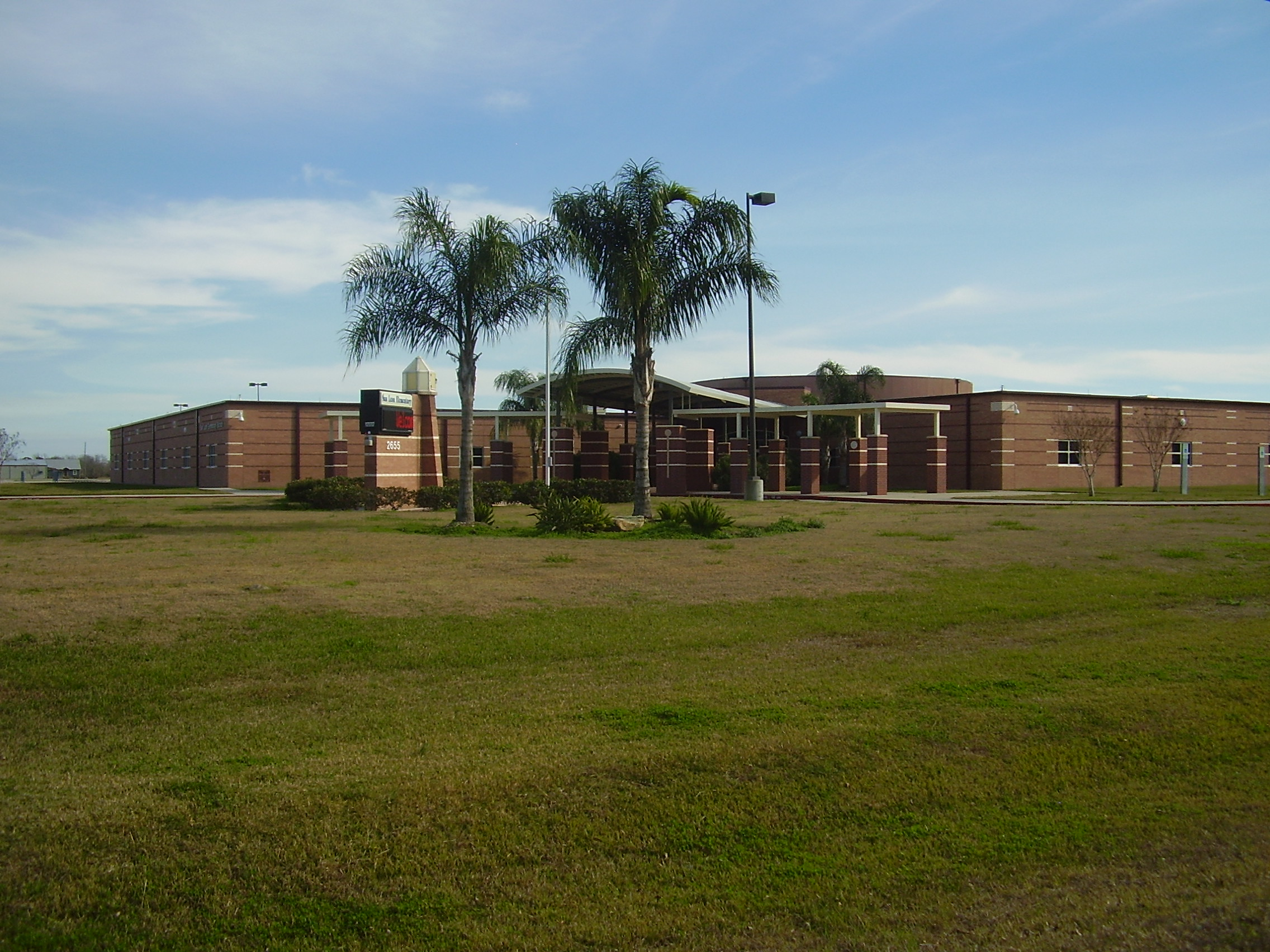
San Leon Elementary School

Middle schools

- Dunbar Middle School (Unincorporated Galveston County, Dickinson address) 5-6
- John and Shamarion Barber Middle School (Dickinson) 5-6

Elementary schools

- Bay Colony Elementary School (League City) grades PK-4
- Hughes Road Elementary School (Dickinson) grades PK-4
- Kenneth E. Little Elementary School (Unincorporated Galveston County, Bacliff address) grades PK-4
- Jake Silbernagel Elementary School (Unincorporated Galveston County, Dickinson address) grades PK-4
- San Leon Elementary School (Unincorporated Galveston County, Dickinson address) grades PK-4
- Calder Road Elementary (League City, Texas) grades PK-4
- Ruty E. Laird Elementary (Texas City, Texas) grades PK-4
- Lobit Campus (Dickinson) grades PK-6 (opened August 2025) (The school was created from the consolidation of Lobit Elementary and Lobit Middle)

=== Alternative schools ===
- Esmond Juvenile Justice Center Residential School - Jerry J. Esmond Juvenile Justice Center, Texas City

== See also ==
- List of school districts in Texas
