= Bayview, Galveston County, Texas =

Unincorporated community in Texas, US

Coordinates: 29°30′54″N 95°00′16″W

Bayview is an area within unincorporated Galveston County, Texas, United States, that was formerly a more distinct community.

The Bayview, San Leon, and Bacliff communities form the "Bayshore" area.

The San Leon-Bacliff-Bayview Chamber of Commerce serves the area.

Like San Leon and Bacliff, many residents in Bayview commute to work in Houston.

== History ==
Bayview was a scattered row of houses located along Galveston Bay north of Farm to Market Road 646 and east of State Highway 146 and between Kemah and Clifton-by-the-Sea (now known as Bacliff). A post office operated between 1902 and 1913. After 1936 the community merged into the Kemah and Clifton-by-the-Sea communities.

Around the 1980s three measures to incorporate the Bacliff area failed by wide margins. In April 1985 residents of Bayview, Bacliff, and San Leon considered an incorporation proposal to become the City of Bayshore. Galveston County Judge Ray Holbrook signed an order for the election to take place on April 6, 1985, freeing the area, which had a population of 11,000, from the extraterritorial jurisdiction of League City and Texas City. Residents rejected the incorporation proposal. The vote was tallied with 1,268 against and 399 in favor. Proponents wanted a local police force and the ability to pass ordinances. Opponents said that the tax base was too small to support municipal services including police and road and drainage improvements.

In 1986 residents in Bacliff and the Bayview considered incorporating into a general law city. Supporters said that incorporation would establish more local control over affairs, an area police department, and the ability to pass ordinances. Opponents said that the area's tax base could not sufficiently support municipal service, including police protection and road and drainage improvements. At the time the 3.6-square-mile (9.3 km^{2}) area considering incorporation had 7,000 people. Galveston County Judge Ray Holbrook signed an order setting the date of the election as Saturday August 9, 1986, and releasing the area from the extraterritorial jurisdiction of Kemah, League City, and Texas City. In 1986 the Bacliff and Bayview area received water and sewer services from two municipal utility districts; if the incorporation measure had passed the districts would have likely remained. Donna Maples, vice president of the Bacliff-Bayview Community Association, supported the incorporation measure. The officials overseeing the election described turnout as "heavy." Officials announced that the incorporation proposal failed on a 770 to 163 count.

In 2000 Bacliff and San Leon formed a nine member board to prepare the communities for incorporation. Joe Sullivan, one of the at-large directors, said that Bayview overwhelmingly voted not to be a part of this council.

== Demographics ==
As of 2012 Bayview, Bacliff, and San Leon together make up the largest unincorporated community in the mainland portion of Galveston County by population. Bayview has an estimated population of 397 as of 2020.

Demographics (2020)
White	94.48%
Two or more races	2.88%
Native American	1.44%
Other race	1.2%
African American	0%
Asian	0%
Native Hawaiian or Pacific Islander	0%

== Government and infrastructure ==
The Bayview Municipal Utility District serves unincorporated areas.

Unincorporated areas in Galveston County receive animal services from the Galveston County Animal Resource Center, an animal shelter operated by the Galveston County Health District in Texas City.

Unincorporated areas in Galveston County receive emergency medical services from the Galveston Area Ambulance Authority (GAAA), also operated by the health district.

== Education ==
The Bayview community is zoned to Clear Creek Independent School District. The CCISD part of the community north of Bay Avenue, which is in the City of Kemah, is within the Board of Trustees District 1, represented by Robert Allan Davee as of 2008. The part south of Bay Avenue, which is unincorporated is within District 5, represented by Dee Scott as of 2008.

Pupils are zoned to Stewart Elementary School (formerly Kemah Elementary School) in unincorporated Galveston County, League City Intermediate School in League City, and Clear Creek High School in League City.

== Parks and recreation ==
T.J. Aulds of The Galveston County Daily News said that Bayview, Bacliff, and San Leon "are known for great spots to eat seafood."
