= Galveston County, Texas =

County in Texas, United States

- County
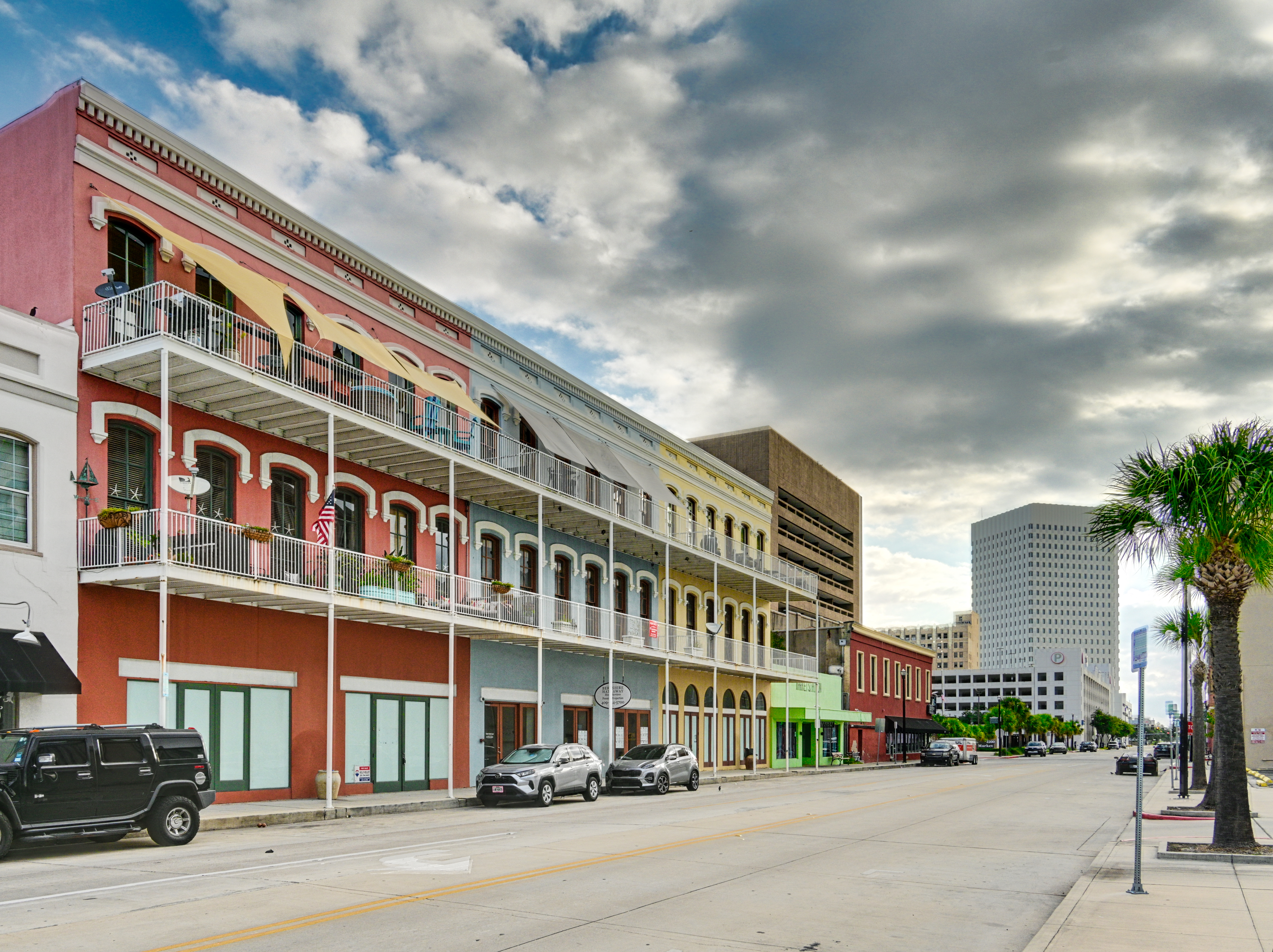
- Galveston in 2021

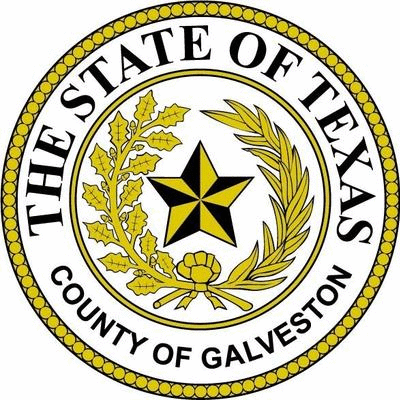
- Seal

- Location within the U.S. state of Texas
- Coordinates: 29°23′N 94°52′W
- Country: United States
- State: Texas
- Founded: 1838
- Named for: City of Galveston
- Seat: Galveston
- Largest city: League City

Area
  - Total: 874 sq mi (2,260 km^{2})
  - Land: 378 sq mi (980 km^{2})
  - Water: 495 sq mi (1,280 km^{2}) 57%

Population (2020)
  - Total: 350,682
  - Estimate (2025): 372,207 ▲
  - Density: 928/sq mi (358/km^{2})
- Time zone: UTC−6 (Central)
  - Summer (DST): UTC−5 (CDT)
- Congressional district: 14th
- Website: www.galvestoncountytx.gov

Galveston County (/ˈɡælvɪstən/ GAL-vis-tən) is a county in the U.S. state of Texas, located along the Gulf Coast adjacent to Galveston Bay. As of the 2020 census, its population was 350,682. The county was founded in 1838. The county seat is the City of Galveston, founded the following year, and located on Galveston Island. The most-populous municipality in the county is League City, a suburb of Galveston at the northern end of the county, which surpassed Galveston in population during the early 2000s.

Galveston County is part of the ten-county Houston–Pasadena–The Woodlands metropolitan statistical area.

== History ==
Sixteenth-century Spanish explorers knew Galveston Island as the Isla de Malhado, the "Isle of Misfortune", or Isla de Culebras, the "Isle of Snakes". In 1519, an expedition led by Alonso Álvarez de Pineda actually sailed past Galveston Island while charting the route from the Florida peninsula to the Pánuco River. The information gathered from the expedition enabled the Spanish government to establish control over the entire Gulf Coast, including Galveston Island. In 1783, José Antonio de Evia, a Spanish navigator, surveyed the area and named the bay "Galveston" to honor Bernardo de Gálvez, who supported the United States in the Revolutionary War.

Galveston County was formally established under the Republic of Texas on May 15, 1838. The county was formed from territory taken from Harrisburg, Liberty, and Brazoria Counties, with governmental organization taking place in 1839. The island and city of Galveston by far formed the most important population center. The city of Galveston was the republic's largest city and its center of commerce and culture. The Galveston County Bar Association, first formed in 1846, is the oldest in Texas. Port Bolivar on the Bolivar Peninsula was a port of secondary importance. Other development in the area was initially mostly ranching interests and small farming communities. Texas soon joined the United States, and Galveston's importance continued to grow as it came to dominate the worldwide cotton trade. As railroads between Galveston, Harrisburg, Houston, and other towns were built during the 19th century, small communities grew up along the rail lines. Nevertheless, Galveston continued to remain a prominent destination for the shipping and trade industries. A bridge was completed in 1859, when the Galveston, Houston, and Henderson Railroad built a wooden trestle that was used by all other railway lines to the island until 1875, when the Gulf, Colorado and Santa Fe Railway built its own bridge. At the end of the 19th century, a group of investors established Texas City directly across the West Bay from Galveston, with the hope of making it a competing port city. The port began operations just before the start of the 20th century.

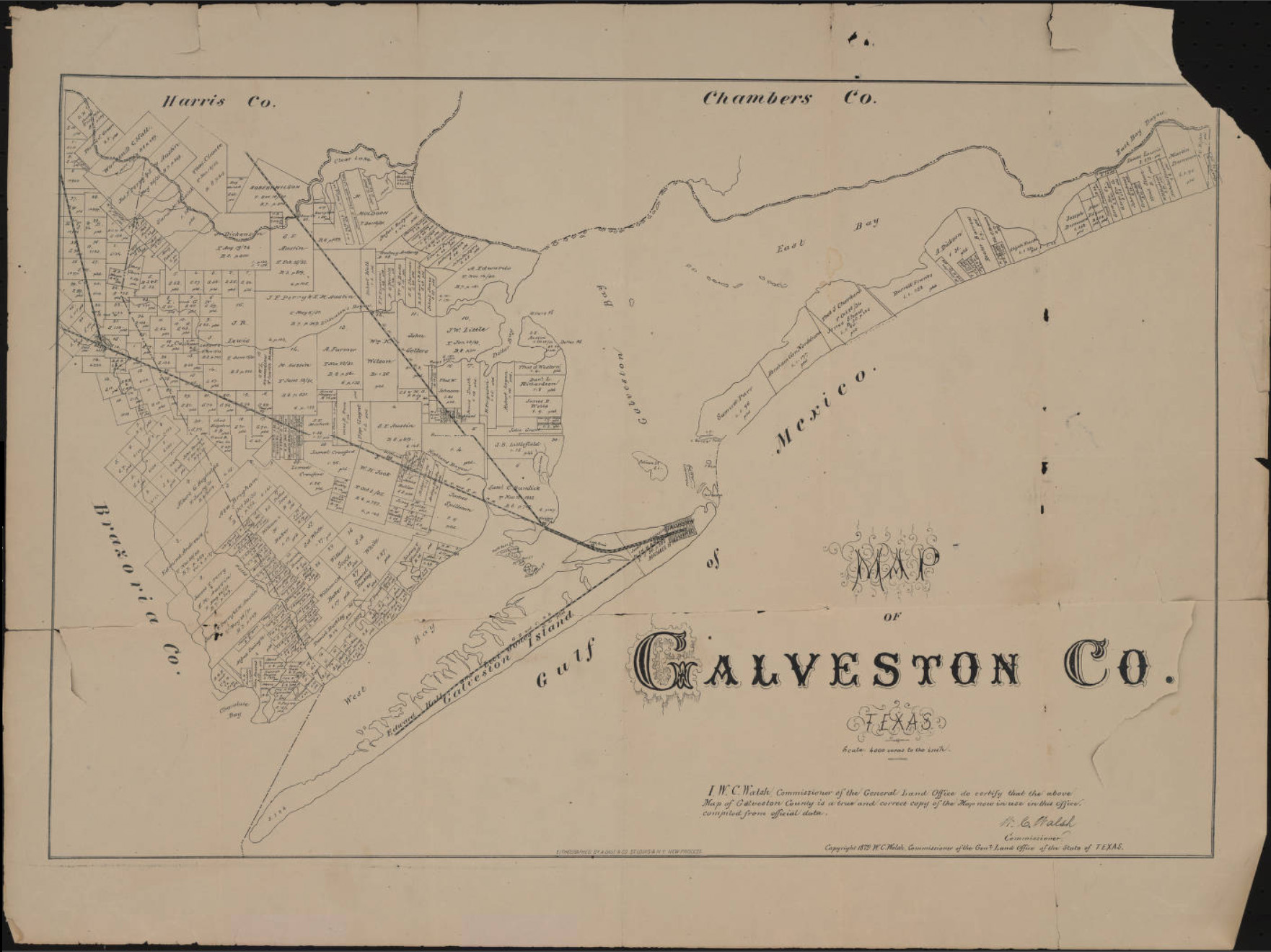
Map of Galveston County in 1879

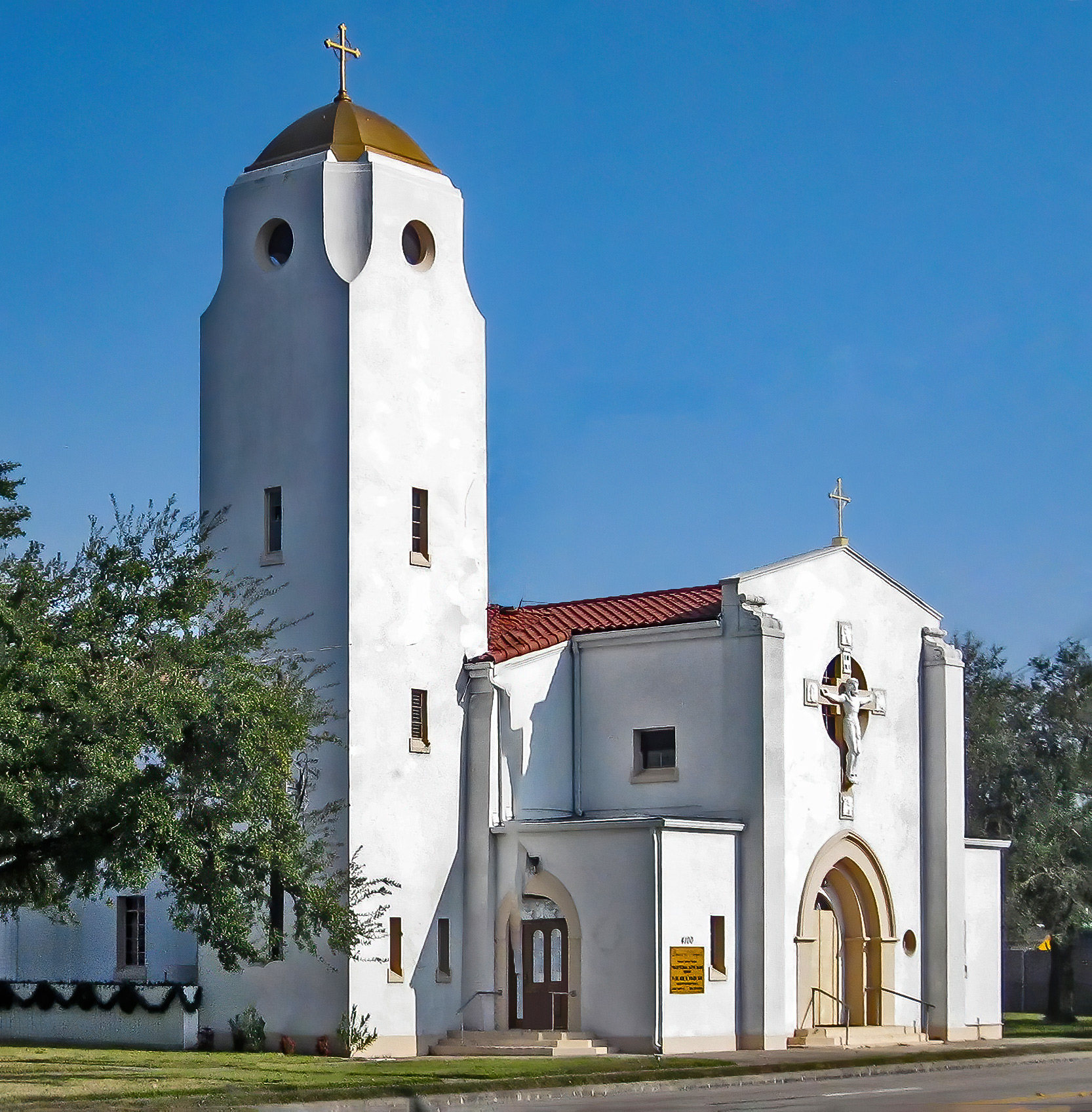
Queen of Angels Church in Dickinson, Texas

The 1900 Galveston Hurricane devastated the county, killing an estimated 6000 people on the island alone and numerous others in the rest of the county. The Port of Galveston was closed for a time during reconstruction, but recovery was swift and profound. By 1910, the county's citizens had developed the commission form of government, constructed the seawall, and raised the merit of the whole city.

Investors had worried that the Texas coast was a dangerous place to establish major commercial operations because of the threat of hurricanes, and the 1900 disaster seemed to prove that. Though Galveston rebuilt its port and other major operations quickly, major investment moved inland, largely to Houston. Soon, Houston and Texas City had outpaced Galveston as major ports.

The oil boom in Texas began in 1901, and pipelines and refineries soon were built in Texas City. Industrial growth blossomed, especially during World War II. Galveston's manufacturing sector, however, was more stagnant during the 20th century.

Galveston, traditionally an attractive tourist destination even before the storm, transformed itself into a major, nationally known destination. Around this time, entrepreneur, power broker, and racketeer Sam Maceo rose to power and transformed the island in what was known as the Free State of Galveston. During this time, the city was home to many casinos, whorehouses, and speakeasies, in addition to becoming a center of culture, economy, and nightlife, all due to the free availability of gambling and alcohol. The city's entertainment business spread throughout the county with major casino districts in Kemah and Dickinson enabled by a lax attitude among law enforcement in the county (Houstonians often humorously referred to the Galveston County line as the "Maceo-Dickinson line"). The county prospered as oil fueled Texas City's industrial growth, and wealthy tourists flocked to Galveston and the other entertainment districts.

The gambling empire was destroyed in the 1950s, as state law enforcement dismantled its establishments. Galveston's economy crashed, as did the economies of some other county municipalities that were dependent on tourism. Texas City's economy weathered the storm because of its strong industry.

The establishment on NASA's Johnson Space Center in 1963 soon created new growth opportunities for the county municipalities near Clear Lake and Harris County. The Clear Lake area communities in Harris and Galveston Counties soon became more tied together, while the island of Galveston languished for many years as businesses increasingly left for the mainland.

Tourism has gradually resurged, both on the island and on the mainland, and today has become a major industry in the county. Aerospace and related service industries continue to be important in the Clear Lake area of the county. Texas City has become an important petrochemical center.

== Geography ==
According to the United States Census Bureau, the county has a total area of 874 square miles (2,260 km^{2}), of which 495 square miles (1,280 km^{2}) (57%) is covered by water.

Galveston County is located on the plains of the Texas Gulf Coast in the southeastern part of the state. The county is bounded on the northeast by Galveston Bay and on the northwest by Clear Creek and Clear Lake. Much of the county covers Galveston Bay, and is bounded to the south by the Galveston Seawall and beaches on the Gulf of Mexico.

=== Adjacent counties ===
- Harris County (north)
- Chambers County (northeast)
- Gulf of Mexico (southeast)
- Brazoria County (west)

== Communities ==
Galveston County has several unincorporated areas; most of them are on the Bolivar Peninsula. Others are outside of Hitchcock and Santa Fe along Texas State Highway 6, and the three communities in the "Bayshore" area: Bacliff, San Leon, and Bayview.

=== Cities ===
- Bayou Vista
- Clear Lake Shores
- Dickinson
- Friendswood (small part in Harris County)
- Galveston (county seat)
- Hitchcock
- Jamaica Beach
- Kemah
- La Marque
- League City (small part in Harris County)
- Santa Fe
- Texas City

=== Villages ===
- Tiki Island

=== Census-designated places ===
- Bacliff
- Bolivar Peninsula
- San Leon

=== Unincorporated communities ===
- Algoa
- Bayview
- Caplen
- Crystal Beach
- Gilchrist
- High Island
- Port Bolivar

Alta Loma, previously unincorporated, became a part of Santa Fe in 1978.

== Demographics ==
Historical population
Census	Pop.	Note	%±
1850	4,529		—
1860	8,229		81.7%
1870	15,290		85.8%
1880	24,121		57.8%
1890	31,476		30.5%
1900	44,116		40.2%
1910	44,479		0.8%
1920	53,150		19.5%
1930	64,401		21.2%
1940	81,173		26.0%
1950	113,066		39.3%
1960	140,364		24.1%
1970	169,812		21.0%
1980	195,940		15.4%
1990	217,399		11.0%
2000	250,158		15.1%
2010	291,309		16.5%
2020	350,682		20.4%
2025 (est.)	372,207	▲	6.1%
U.S. Decennial Census; 1850–2010 2010 2020

=== Racial and ethnic composition ===
Galveston County, Texas – Racial and ethnic composition Note: the US Census treats Hispanic/Latino as an ethnic category. This table excludes Latinos from the racial categories and assigns them to a separate category. Hispanics/Latinos may be of any race.
Race / Ethnicity (NH = Non-Hispanic)	Pop 1980	Pop 1990	Pop 2000	Pop 2010	Pop 2020	% 1980	% 1990	% 2000	% 2010	% 2020
White alone (NH)	133,898	144,852	157,851	172,652	191,358	68.34%	66.63%	63.10%	59.27%	54.57%
Black or African American alone (NH)	35,895	37,414	38,179	39,229	43,120	18.32%	17.21%	15.26%	13.47%	12.30%
Native American or Alaska Native alone (NH)	525	632	893	1,052	1,036	0.27%	0.29%	0.36%	0.36%	0.30%
Asian alone (NH)	1,762	3,357	5,152	8,515	12,202	0.90%	1.54%	2.06%	2.92%	3.48%
Native Hawaiian or Pacific Islander alone (NH)	x	x	88	128	223	x	x	0.04%	0.04%	0.06%
Other race alone (NH)	303	182	268	426	1,455	0.15%	0.08%	0.11%	0.15%	0.41%
Mixed race or Multiracial (NH)	x	x	2,788	4,037	12,652	x	x	1.11%	1.39%	3.61%
Hispanic or Latino (any race)	23,557	30,962	44,939	65,270	88,636	12.02%	14.24%	17.96%	22.41%	25.28%
Total	195,940	217,399	250,158	291,309	350,682	100.00%	100.00%	100.00%	100.00%	100.00%

=== American Community Survey 2025 data ===
The United States Census Bureau estimated that in 2025, Galveston County’s population was 372.207. It was also estimated that the county's population was 52,40% Non-Hispanic White, 27,90% Hispanic or Latino, 12,40% Non-Hispanic Black, 3,90% Asian, 0,30% Native American, 0,06% Pacific Islander, and 2,90% Multiracial.

Total	Population	Percentage
Non-Hispanic White	195,036	52.40%
Hispanic or Latino	103,846	27.90%
Non-Hispanic Black	46,154	12.40%
Asian	14,516	3.90%
Native American	1,117	0.30%
Pacific Islander	223	0.06%
Non-Hispanic Multiracial	10,794	2.90%

=== 2020 census ===
As of the 2020 census, the county had a population of 350,682. The median age was 39.0 years. 23.8% of residents were under the age of 18 and 15.5% of residents were 65 years of age or older. For every 100 females there were 95.8 males, and for every 100 females age 18 and over there were 93.7 males age 18 and over.

The racial makeup of the county was 61.2% White, 12.6% Black or African American, 0.8% American Indian and Alaska Native, 3.6% Asian, 0.1% Native Hawaiian and Pacific Islander, 8.4% from some other race, and 13.4% from two or more races. Hispanic or Latino residents of any race comprised 25.3% of the population.

95.9% of residents lived in urban areas, while 4.1% lived in rural areas.

There were 132,819 households in the county, of which 33.4% had children under the age of 18 living in them. Of all households, 48.9% were married-couple households, 18.1% were households with a male householder and no spouse or partner present, and 26.7% were households with a female householder and no spouse or partner present. About 25.8% of all households were made up of individuals and 10.1% had someone living alone who was 65 years of age or older.

There were 156,191 housing units, of which 15.0% were vacant. Among occupied housing units, 66.5% were owner-occupied and 33.5% were renter-occupied. The homeowner vacancy rate was 1.9% and the rental vacancy rate was 11.8%.

=== 2000 census ===
According to the census of 2000, 250,158 people, 94,782 households, and 66,157 families resided in the county. The population density was 628 people per square mile (242 people/km^{2}). The 111,733 housing units averaged 280 per square mile (110/km^{2}). The racial makeup of the county was 72.69% White, 15.44% Black or African American, 0.47% Native American, 2.10% Asian, 0.04% Pacific Islander, 7.18% from other races, and 2.08% from two or more races. About 18% of the population was Hispanic or Latino of any race.

Of the 94,782 households at the 2000 census, 33.80% had children under 18 living with them, 52.40% were married couples living together, 13.10% had a female householder with no husband present, and 30.20% were not families. Around 25.1% of all households were made up of individuals, and 8.1% had someone living alone who was 65 or older. The average household size was 2.60, and the average family size was 3.12.

In the county, the age distribution was 26.7% under 18, 8.70% from 18 to 24, 30.2% from 25 to 44, 23.3% from 45 to 64, and 11.1% who were 65 or older. The median age was 36 years. For every 100 females, there were 95.90 males. For every 100 females 18 and over, there were 93.10 males.

In 2000, the median income for a household in the county was $42,419, and for a family was $51,435. Males had a median income of $41,406 versus $28,703 for females. The per capita income for the county was $21,568. About 10.10% of families and 13.20% of the population were below the poverty line, including 17.60% of those under age 18 and 10.20% of those age 65 or over.

== Politics ==
Galveston County was a longtime Democratic stronghold in the 20th century, having only voted for Republicans in national landslide election years (1956, 1972, and 1984), and maintained this Democratic lean even after the state of Texas as a whole began shifting toward the Republican party. In 2000, it supported Republican Texas governor George W. Bush as president and has stayed in the Republican column ever since. Mitt Romney in 2012 and Donald Trump in 2024 each brought out record-setting performance for the Republican party in the county.

The head of a Texas county, as set up in the Texas Constitution, is the county judge, who sits as the chair of the county's commissioners' court. The county is split into four geographical divisions called precincts. Each precinct elects a commissioner to sit as a representative of their precinct on the commissioners court and also for the oversight of county functions in their area.

Other elected positions in Galveston County include a county clerk, a district attorney, a district clerk, a county clerk, a sheriff, nine constables, a tax assessor-collector, a county treasurer, and every judge in the county except municipal judges, who are appointed by the officials of their respective cities.

In September 2023, Galveston County was sued in what was the first Voting Rights Act case since Section 2 of the Act was upheld in Allen v Milligan in June. Under the map adopted by the Republican county commissioners in 2021, all four precincts of Galveston County are majority White, despite Black and Latino people making up 45% of the county's population; under previous maps dating back to the 1980s, Precinct 3 was majority minority. On October 13, Judge Jeff Brown of the Southern District of Texas ordered the county commissioners to redraw the electoral map within one week to include at least one majority-minority district, finding the 2021 map to be "stark and jarring" in its gerrymandering of Galveston County.

=== United States Congress ===
U.S. Senators	Name	Party	First Elected	Level
Senate Class 2	John Cornyn	Republican	2002	Senior Senator
Senate Class 1	Ted Cruz	Republican	2012	Junior Senator
U.S. Representatives	Name	Party	First Elected	
District 14	Randy Weber	Republican	2012	

United States presidential election results for Galveston County, Texas
Year	Republican		Democratic		Third party(ies)	
Year	No.	%	No.	%	No.	%
1912	336	10.01%	2,513	74.86%	508	15.13%
1916	1,263	25.64%	3,543	71.94%	119	2.42%
1920	1,625	30.27%	2,933	54.63%	811	15.11%
1924	1,912	25.10%	5,068	66.52%	639	8.39%
1928	4,401	42.43%	5,951	57.38%	20	0.19%
1932	2,011	15.98%	10,491	83.38%	80	0.64%
1936	1,666	15.00%	9,370	84.37%	70	0.63%
1940	2,443	17.92%	11,161	81.87%	28	0.21%
1944	1,542	10.23%	11,748	77.94%	1,784	11.83%
1948	4,857	25.85%	12,491	66.47%	1,444	7.68%
1952	15,715	45.00%	19,058	54.58%	147	0.42%
1956	17,567	52.43%	15,603	46.57%	336	1.00%
1960	16,373	40.10%	23,940	58.64%	515	1.26%
1964	12,365	28.64%	30,672	71.04%	136	0.32%
1968	16,229	30.86%	26,041	49.52%	10,322	19.63%
1972	30,936	57.49%	22,565	41.93%	310	0.58%
1976	25,251	39.62%	37,873	59.42%	611	0.96%
1980	29,527	46.65%	30,778	48.62%	2,992	4.73%
1984	40,262	52.40%	36,092	46.97%	482	0.63%
1988	34,913	47.15%	38,633	52.18%	496	0.67%
1992	31,303	34.69%	38,623	42.80%	20,316	22.51%
1996	35,251	44.01%	38,458	48.02%	6,380	7.97%
2000	50,397	54.20%	40,020	43.04%	2,566	2.76%
2004	61,290	57.83%	43,919	41.44%	772	0.73%
2008	62,258	59.29%	41,805	39.81%	941	0.90%
2012	69,059	62.74%	39,511	35.89%	1,508	1.37%
2016	73,757	60.01%	43,658	35.52%	5,488	4.47%
2020	93,911	60.45%	58,842	37.88%	2,593	1.67%
2024	100,295	63.08%	56,732	35.68%	1,969	1.24%

United States Senate election results for Galveston County, Texas1
Year	Republican		Democratic		Third party(ies)	
Year	No.	%	No.	%	No.	%
2024	95,114	60.05%	59,316	37.45%	3,962	2.50%

United States Senate election results for Galveston County, Texas2
Year	Republican		Democratic		Third party(ies)	
Year	No.	%	No.	%	No.	%
2020	94,317	61.49%	55,094	35.92%	3,975	2.59%
2026	69,943	51.96%	62,051	46.10%	2,604	1.93%

Texas Gubernatorial election results for Galveston County
Year	Republican		Democratic		Third party(ies)	
Year	No.	%	No.	%	No.	%
2022	68,822	62.15%	40,229	36.33%	1,683	1.52%
2026	72,745	54.00%	59,716	44.33%	2,256	1.67%

=== Texas Legislature ===
==== Texas Senate ====
District	Name	Party	First Elected
11	Mayes Middleton	Republican	2022

==== Texas House of Representatives ====
District	Name	Party	First Elected	Area(s) of Galveston County Represented
23	Teresa Leo Wilson	Republican	2022	Galveston, Jamaica Beach, Texas City, Port Bolivar, Crystal Beach, Gilchrist & High Island
24	Greg Bonnen	Republican	2012	Hitchcock, La Marque, Santa Fe, Dickinson, League City, Friendswood (Galveston County part), Algoa, Kemah, Clear Lake Shores

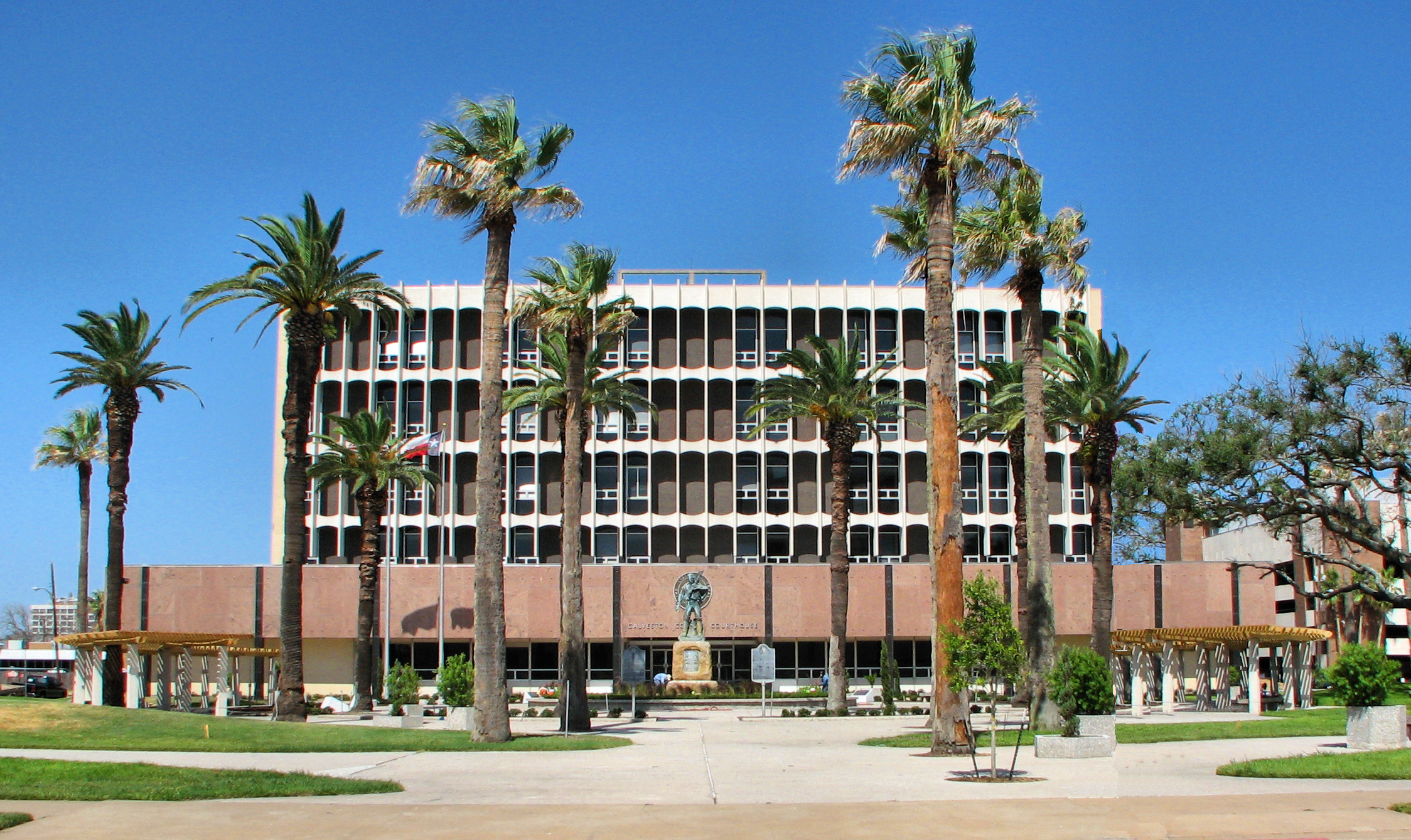
Galveston County Administrative Courthouse

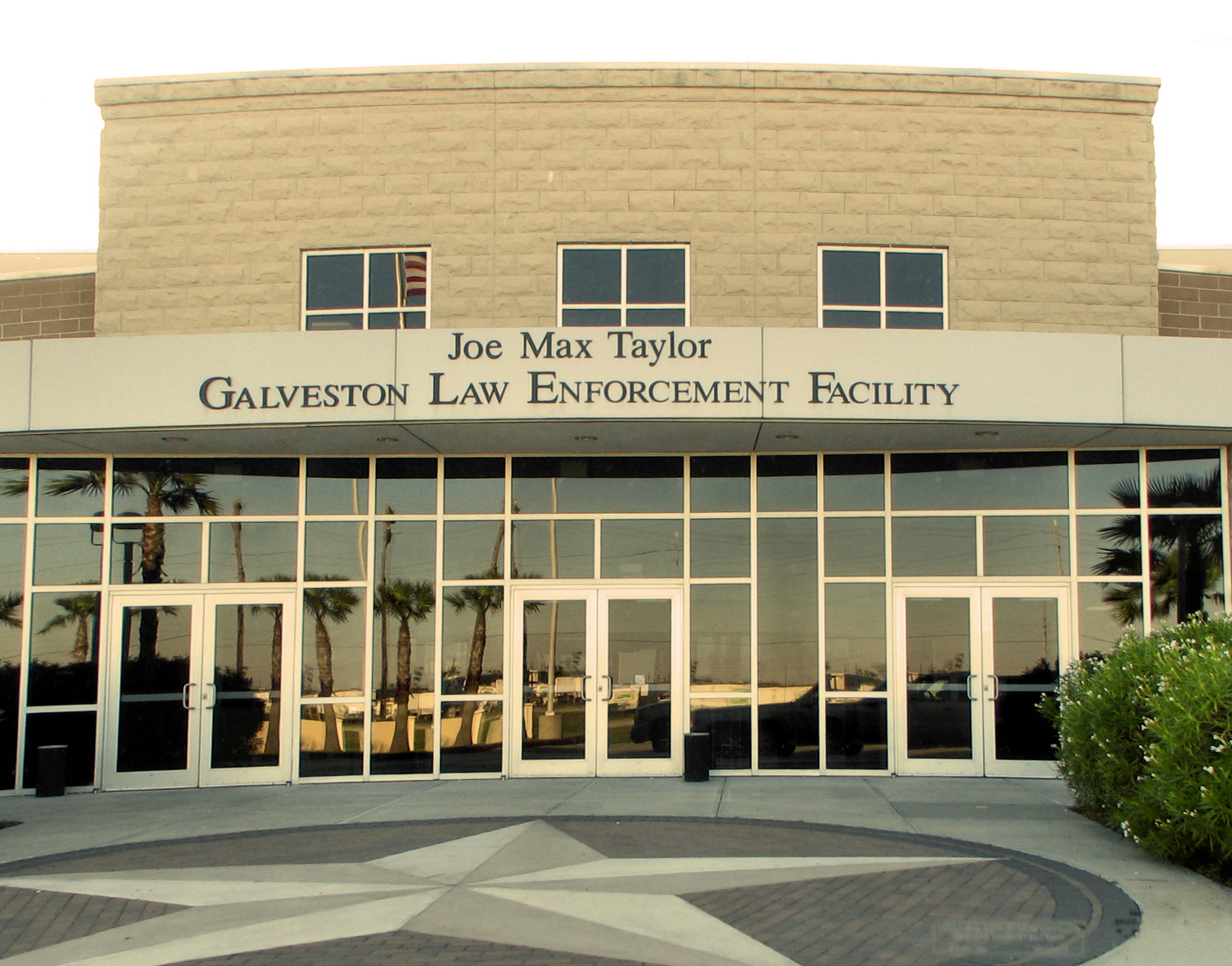
The Joe Max Taylor Galveston Law Enforcement Facility includes the main station of the Galveston County Sheriff's Office

== Education ==
=== K-12 education ===
Eight independent school districts (ISDs) serve Galveston County communities:

- Clear Creek ISD
- Dickinson ISD
- Friendswood ISD
- Galveston ISD
- High Island ISD
- Hitchcock ISD
- Santa Fe ISD
- Texas City ISD

A ninth school district, La Marque Independent School District, was subsumed into Texas City ISD in 2016 after the Texas Education Agency revoked its accreditation due to poor academic and financial performance.

=== Higher education ===
The city of Galveston is home to Texas A&M University at Galveston, an extension of the main A&M campus in College Station, and the University of Texas Medical Branch at Galveston.

The Texas Legislature specified that the following community colleges also serve the area: College of the Mainland for Texas City (including former La Marque), Hitchcock, Santa Fe, Friendswood, and Dickinson school districts as well as the Galveston County portion of Clear Creek ISD (in other words, mainland Galveston County); and Galveston College for Galveston ISD and High Island ISD (the islands).

=== Public libraries ===
The Galveston County Library System, created in 1941, supports libraries in most of the larger towns and cities. The Rosenberg Library in Galveston, a 501(c)3 nonprofit organization, has the distinction of being the oldest public library in Texas, and serves as the headquarters for the Galveston County Library System. Its librarian also functions as the Galveston County librarian. Also, seven other libraries are in Galveston County, including the Genevieve Miller Library in Hitchcock, the La Marque Public Library, the Helen Hall Public Library in League City, the Moore Memorial Public Library in Texas City, the Dickinson Public Library, the Friendswood Public Library, and the Mae Bruce Library in Santa Fe.

== Hospital services ==
Galveston County is served by a major medical complex in Galveston and a private for-profit hospital in Texas City.

The University of Texas Medical Branch in Galveston is a 1,200-bed, major medical complex of seven hospitals. The main general-care hospital is John Sealy Hospital, with other on-campus hospitals specializing in women, children, burn victims, geriatrics, and psychiatrics. Currently, UTMB is certified as a level I trauma center and serves as the lead trauma facility for the nine-county region in southeast Texas, including the Greater Houston area.

The Mainland Medical Center, a 233-bed, private, for-profit hospital, operates in Texas City.

== Health and animal services ==
The Galveston County Health District is headquartered in Texas City.

The Galveston County Animal Resource Center, an animal shelter operated by the Galveston County Health District, is in Texas City. This shelter covers unincorporated areas as well as Bayou Vista, Clear Lake Shores, Hitchcock, Kemah, La Marque, Santa Fe, Texas City, and Tiki Island. The cities of Friendswood and League City operate their own animal shelters. Dickinson and Galveston contract with nonprofit animal shelter services organizations.

== Corrections ==
The Galveston County Jail is located at 5700 Avenue H in Galveston.

The Texas Department of Criminal Justice and University of Texas Medical Branch manage health care facilities for prisoners in Galveston, Galveston County. The facilities include the co-gender Galveston Hospital for prisoners in Galveston and the Young Medical Facility Complex for females in Texas City. Hospital Galveston began contracting for medical treatment of prisoners in 1983. Young opened in 1996 as the Texas City Regional Medical Unit.

== Transportation ==
=== Major highways ===
- Interstate 45
- State Highway 3
- State Highway 6
- State Highway 87
- State Highway 96
- State Highway 99 - Grand Parkway (under construction)
- State Highway 124
- State Highway 146
- State Highway 168
- State Highway 275
- Loop 108
- Loop 197
- Spur 342

=== Airports ===
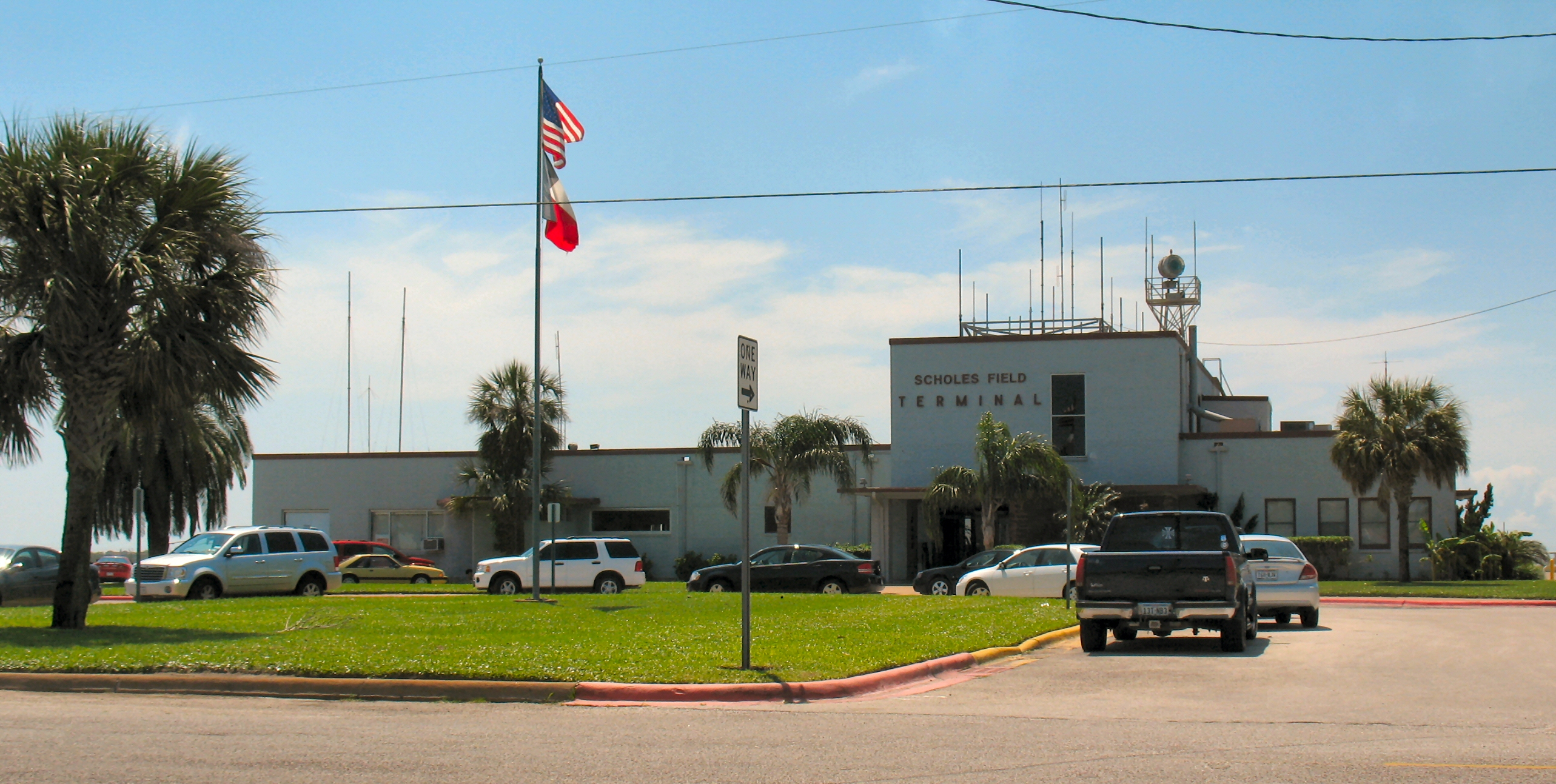
Scholes International Airport at Galveston

Scholes International Airport at Galveston (IATA: GLS, ICAO: KGLS), the county's sole publicly owned airport, is a two-runway airport located on Galveston Island in Galveston. The airport is primarily used for general aviation, offshore energy transportation, and some limited military operations.

Privately owned airports for private use include Creasy Airport and Kami-Kazi Airport, both inn unincorporated areas.

The closest airport with regularly scheduled commercial service is William P. Hobby Airport, located in Houston. The Houston Airport System stated that Galveston County is also within the primary service area of George Bush Intercontinental Airport, an international airport near Houston in Harris County.

Private heliports for private use include:

- University of Texas Medical Branch in Galveston has two heliports: one for Ewing Hall and one for its emergency room.
- Republic Helicopters Heliport is in an unincorporated area, adjacent to Hitchcock.

=== Rail ===
All rail traffic is currently industry-related. Regularly scheduled passenger rail service in Galveston County ceased on April 11, 1967.

=== Mass transit ===
The City of Galveston is served by Island Transit, a public transportation agency.

== Notable people ==
- John Baptista Ashe, former U.S. Representative for Tennessee
- Dez Bryant, American football wide receiver and return specialist for the Dallas Cowboys, was born in Galveston County.
- Red Bryant, American football defensive end for the Seattle Seahawks of the National Football League, was born in Galveston County.
- YBN Almighty Jay, rapper in the YBN collective, was born in Galveston County.
- Larry Taylor - Republican member of the Texas Senate from District 11 (2013–present) and Texas House of Representatives from District 24 (2003–2013)
- Taurian Fontenette, basketball player remembered in conjunction with the film Air Up There (1994).

== See also ==
- List of museums in the Texas Gulf Coast
- National Register of Historic Places listings in Galveston County, Texas
- Recorded Texas Historic Landmarks in Galveston County
