= Dickinson High School (Texas) =

Public school in Texas, United States

Location
- 3800 Baker Dr; Dickinson, Texas 77539; United States; 29°28′03″N 95°01′55″W

Information
- Type: Public High School
- Motto: "Let’s go gators!”
- School district: Dickinson ISD
- Principal: Courtney Ramirez
- Teaching staff: 234.21 (FTE)
- Grades: 9-12
- Enrollment: 3,763 (2023-2024)
- Student to teacher ratio: 16.07
- Colors: Blue and white
- Athletics: Top 10 in State
- Mascot: Gators
- Test average: 12%
- Website: schools.dickinsonisd.org/page/10.homepage
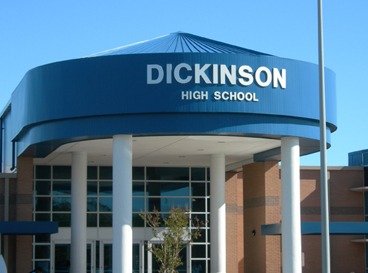
- Main entrance

Dickinson High School is located in Dickinson, Texas, United States, in the Dickinson Independent School District. The school serves most of Dickinson, all of San Leon, the majority of Bacliff, and portions of League City and Texas City.

The school colors are blue and white with red trims. The Dickinson Gators' school mascot is "Big Al" the alligator.

== School awards ==
=== Football ===
- Texas Class 3A State Champions: 1977.

=== Band ===
- Texas Class 4A State Marching Band Champions: 1986, 1989, 1990, 1991, and 1993, all under the direction of Mr. Donnie Owens and Mr. John Gossett. In 1995 and 1997, the band placed 2nd under the direction of Mr. Greg Goodman, and in 2007 won 3rd place in the same competition under the direction of Mr. Wade McDonald. The band also placed 4th in 1987 and 2nd in 1988.
- Bands of America Southwest Regional Competition, Best in Class: 1989, 1992, 1993, 1994, 1996, and 1997.

.........................................................................................

== Notable alumni ==
- Craig Bohmler '74, composer.
- Dennis Cook '81, Major League baseball player.
- Keith Cooper '21, NFL defensive lineman for the Detroit Lions
- Hal Dues, Major League Baseball player.
- Marquis Johnson '23, Wide receiver for the Mississippi State Bulldogs
- Donnie Little '78, Quarterback and wide receiver for the University of Texas '82, and four years at wide receiver for the Ottawa Rough Riders in the Canadian Football League.
- Tramon Mark '20, College basketball player
- Tracy Scoggins '70, Actress, Babylon 5.
- Andre Ware '86, Quarterback for University of Houston '90, 1989 Heisman Trophy winner, first round selection (#7 overall) in the 1990 NFL Draft by the Detroit Lions
- Marcus Williams '20, basketball player in the Israeli Basketball Premier League
- P. J. Williams '22, Offensive tackle for the SMU Mustangs
