= Dickinson, Texas =

- City
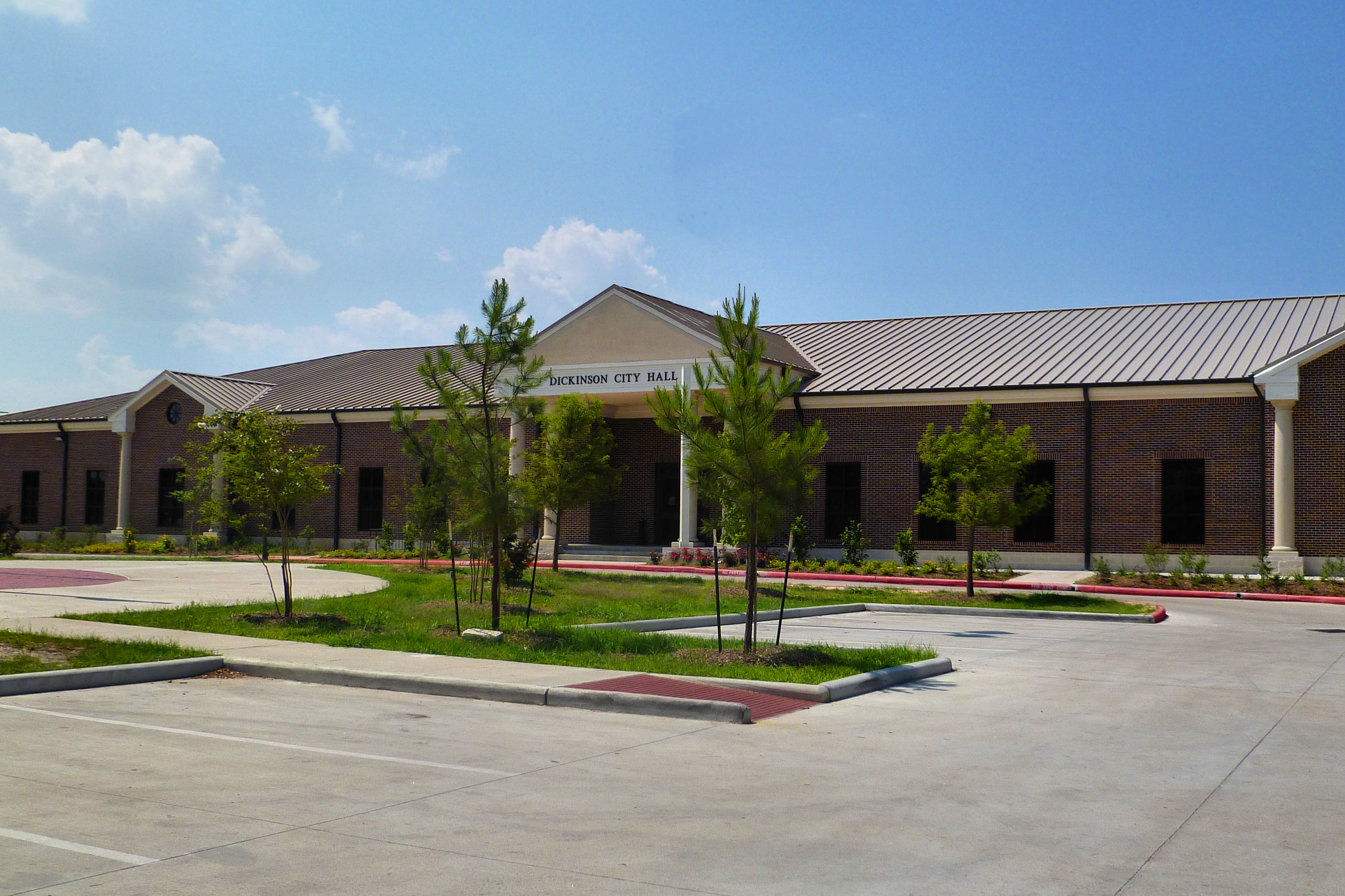
- Dickinson City Hall

- Location in the state of Texas
- Coordinates: 29°27′39″N 95°03′04″W
- Country: United States
- State: Texas
- County: Galveston
- Incorporated: 1977
- Named for: John Dickinson

Government
  - Type: Council-manager
  - Mayor: Travis Magliolo
  - City Manager: Chaise Cary
  - Assistant City Manager: Matt Maggiolino
  - City Council: Dawn King; M. Shaun Holt; Mark Townsend; Scott Shrader; Joe Wilburn; Kevin Edmonds

Area
  - Total: 10.397 sq mi (26.928 km^{2})
  - Land: 9.965 sq mi (25.810 km^{2})
  - Water: 0.432 sq mi (1.118 km^{2})
- Elevation: 9.8 ft (3 m)

Population (2020)
  - Total: 20,847
  - Estimate (2024): 21,834
  - Density: 2,181/sq mi (842.2/km^{2})
- Time zone: UTC–6 (Central (CST))
  - Summer (DST): UTC–5 (CDT)
- ZIP Code: 77539
- Area code: 281
- FIPS code: 48-20344
- GNIS feature ID: 1334345
- Website: www.dickinsontexas.gov

Dickinson is a city in Galveston County, Texas, United States, within Houston–Pasadena–The Woodlands metropolitan area. Its population was 20,847 at the 2020 census.

== History ==
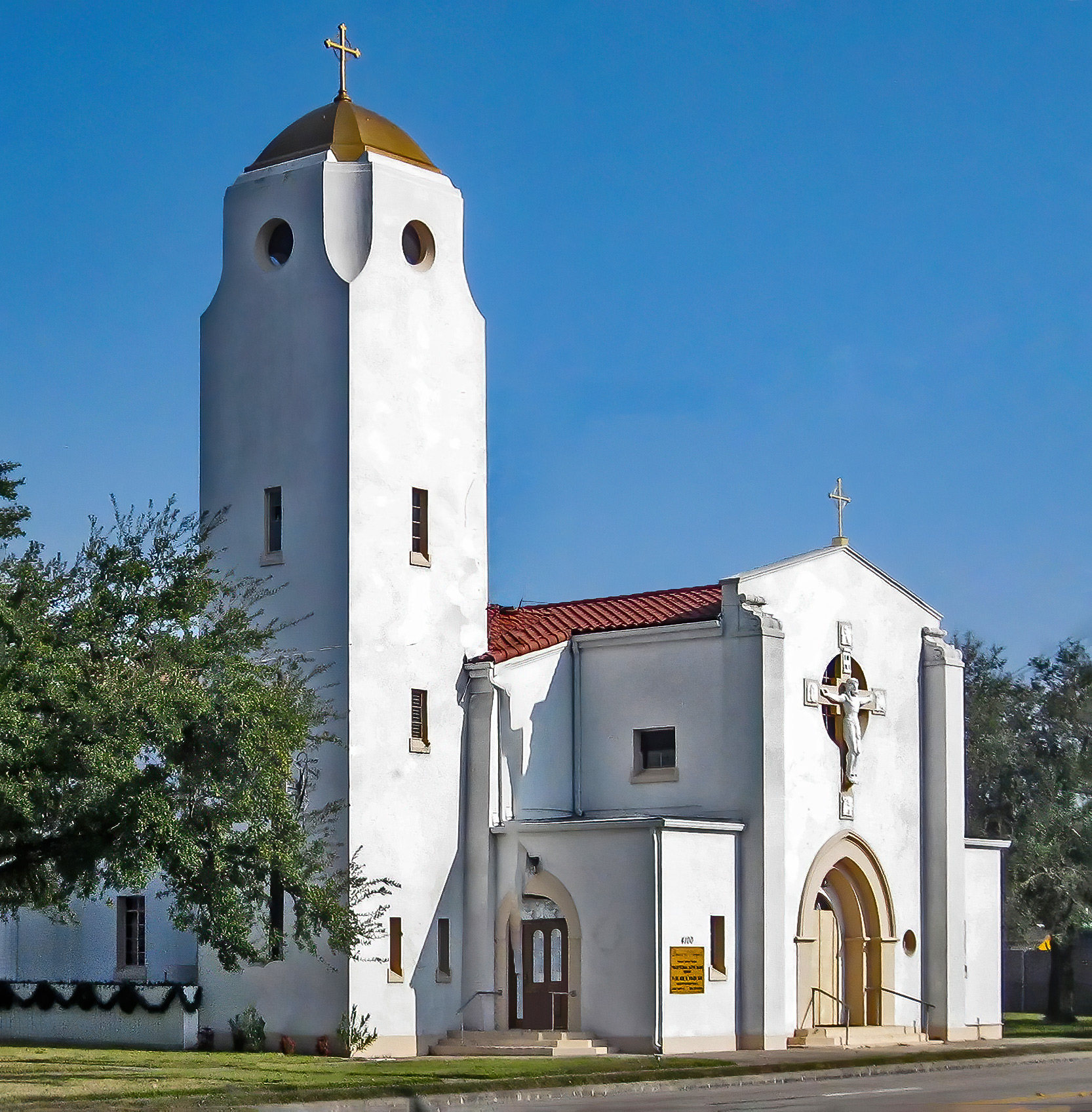
Queen of Angels Church in Dickinson, Texas

Dickinson is located on a tract of land granted to John Dickinson in 1824, and named after him. A settlement had been established in this area on Dickinson Bayou before 1850. The Galveston, Houston, and Henderson Railroad was built directly through Dickinson. This line was used in the American Civil War to successfully retake Galveston.

The Dickinson Land and Improvement Association was organized in the 1890s by Fred M. Nichols and eight other businessmen. It marketed to potential farmers with claims of the soil's suitability for food crops, and to socialites with the creation of the Dickinson Picnic Grounds and other attractions. By 1911, the Galveston–Houston Electric Railway had three stops in Dickinson, and the Oleander Country Club was a popular destination for prominent Galvestonians.

In 1905, Italian ambassador Baron Mayor des Planches convinced about 150 Italians from crowded eastern cities to move to Dickinson. They joined the dozens relocated there after flooding in Bryan forced them to seek new homes.

During the 1920s, Dickinson became a significant tourist destination resulting from investment by the Maceo crime syndicate, which ran Galveston during this time. The syndicate created gambling venues in the city such as the Silver Moon casino.

The City of Dickinson constructed a new multimillion-dollar city hall and library complex that was dedicated June 30, 2009. The complex is located at 4403 Highway 3.

In May 2009, the city began hosting a crawfish festival, called the Red, White and Bayou Crawfish Festival. The city decided in 2018 not to continue with the festival. In August 2022, the city resumed the festival.

In August 2017, Dickinson was devastated by Hurricane Harvey. About 90% of the city was flooded during the storm and 50% was destroyed by flooding. The city received international attention after they tried to force citizens to sign loyalty pledges to Israel to receive relief aid. Local officials said it was required, due to Texas' strict anti-BDS laws.

In January 2021, Dickinson made national news by the mayoral election run-off ending in a tie (1,010 votes each); Mayor Sean Skipworth was selected by drawing a name out of a hat.

In August 2021, Dickinson made national news again when Council Member Position 1, H. Scott Apley died of the COVID-19 virus after making many antimask and antivaccine social-media posts. Johnnie Simpson Jr., a United Methodist pastor, won the seat after earning 49% of the vote in a four-way special election, and 60.3% of the vote in a runoff.

== Geography and Climate ==
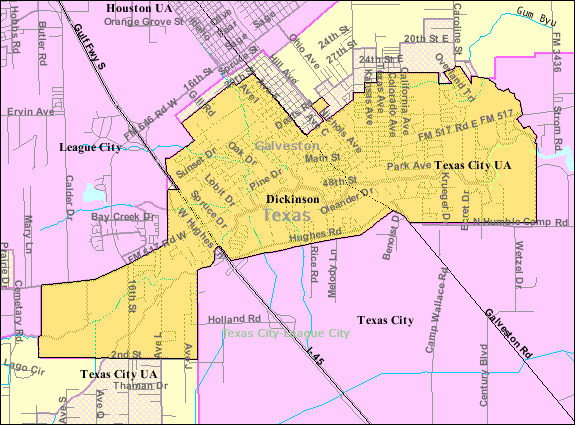
Map of Dickinson

Dickinson is located at 29°27′39″N 95°03′05″W (29.4607876, -95.0513173). This is about 28 miles (45 km) southeast of Houston and 19 miles (31 km) northwest of Galveston. According to the United States Census Bureau, the city has a total area of 10.397 square miles (26.93 km^{2}), of which 0.432 sq mi (1.12 km^{2}), or 4.32%, is covered by water.

Climate: Dickinson and surrounding areas have a high average rainfall, about 57-61" annually, corresponding with the humid subtropical biome in which they are located. Winters are mild with the occasional cold spell or freeze, spring and summers are warm and hot with high humidity daily. The 30 year 1991-2020 average annual temperature was 70.6 degrees F and the average rainfall was 60.37" during that same climatological period. These numbers are used from the Houston National Weather Service office (Station ID: 414333), whose mailing address is located in Dickinson off FM-646.

Climate data for Dickinson, Texas
Month	Jan	Feb	Mar	Apr	May	Jun	Jul	Aug	Sep	Oct	Nov	Dec	Year
Average precipitation inches	4.80	3.02	3.30	4.22	5.12	6.54	4.36	6.64	7.34	5.79	4.54	4.53	60.2
Average precipitation mm	122	77	84	107	130	166	111	169	186	147	115	115	1,529
Source: https://www.ncei.noaa.gov/access/us-climate-normals/#dataset=normals-annualseasonal&timeframe=30&station=USC00414333

== Demographics ==
Historical population
Year	Pop.	±%
1930	760	—
1950	2,704	+255.8%
1960	4,715	+74.4%
1970	10,776	+128.5%
1980	7,505	−30.4%
1990	11,692	+55.8%
2000	17,093	+46.2%
2010	18,680	+9.3%
2020	20,847	+11.6%
2024	21,834	+4.7%
U.S. Decennial Census; 1850-2000; 2020 Census; 2024 Estimate

=== Racial and ethnic composition ===
Dickinson city, Texas – Racial and ethnic composition Note: the US Census treats Hispanic/Latino as an ethnic category. This table excludes Latinos from the racial categories and assigns them to a separate category. Hispanics/Latinos may be of any race.
Race / Ethnicity (NH = Non-Hispanic)	Pop 2000	Pop 2010	Pop 2020	% 2000	% 2010	% 2020
White alone (NH)	10,569	9,770	9,507	61.83%	52.30%	45.60%
Black or African American alone (NH)	1,776	2,087	2,202	10.39%	11.17%	10.56%
Native American or Alaska Native alone (NH)	69	57	61	0.40%	0.31%	0.29%
Asian alone (NH)	190	350	514	1.11%	1.87%	2.47%
Native Hawaiian or Pacific Islander alone (NH)	0	9	14	0.00%	0.05%	0.07%
Other race alone (NH)	30	64	82	0.18%	0.34%	0.39%
Mixed race or Multiracial (NH)	203	237	713	1.19%	1.27%	3.42%
Hispanic or Latino (any race)	4,256	6,106	7,754	24.90%	32.69%	37.19%
Total	17,093	18,680	20,847	100.00%	100.00%	100.00%

=== 2020 census ===
As of the 2020 census, Dickinson had a population of 20,847. The median age was 35.6 years. 26.5% of residents were under the age of 18 and 13.1% of residents were 65 years of age or older. For every 100 females there were 95.9 males, and for every 100 females age 18 and over there were 93.3 males age 18 and over.

The population density was 2,135.32 inhabitants per square mile (824.45/km^{2}). The 8,249 housing units had an average density of 793.4 per square mile (306.3/km^{2}). Of those units, 11.6% were vacant, the homeowner vacancy rate was 2.0%, and the rental vacancy rate was 14.1%.

Of the 7,290 households, 38.8% had children under the age of 18 living in them, 50.2% were married-couple households, 16.8% were households with a male householder and no spouse or partner present, and 25.6% were households with a female householder and no spouse or partner present. About 20.2% of all households were made up of individuals and 7.6% had someone living alone who was 65 years of age or older. The average household size was 2.6, and 5,379 families lived in the city with an average family size of 3.2.

98.2% of residents lived in urban areas, while 1.8% lived in rural areas.

Racial composition as of the 2020 census
Race	Number	Percent
White	11,494	55.1%
Black or African American	2,276	10.9%
American Indian and Alaska Native	230	1.1%
Asian	531	2.5%
Native Hawaiian and Other Pacific Islander	20	0.1%
Some other race	2,915	14.0%
Two or more races	3,381	16.2%

=== 2000 census ===
As of the 2000 census, 17,093 people, 6,162 households, and 4,522 families resided in the city. The population density was 1,770.7 inhabitants per square mile (683.7/km^{2}). The 6,556 housing units had an average density of 679.1 per square mile (262.2/km^{2}). The racial makeup of the city was 75.35% White, 10.52% African American, 0.64% Native American, 1.21% Asian, 0.04% Pacific Islander, 12.82% from other races, and 2.43% from two or more races. Hispanics or Latinos of any race were 24.90% of the population.

Of the 6,162 households, 36.6% had children under 18 living with them, 55.4% were married couples living together, 13.0% had a female householder with no husband present, and 26.6% were not families. About 21.6% of all households were made up of individuals, and 6.6% had someone living alone who was 65 or older. The average household size was 2.76 and the average family size was 3.22.

In the city, the age distribution was 28.5% under 18, 9.6% from 18 to 24, 30.5% from 25 to 44, 21.8% from 45 to 64, and 9.6% who were 65 or older. The median age was 34 years. For every 100 females, there were 99.7 males. For every 100 females 18 and over, there were 98.2 males.

The median income for a household in the city was $41,984, and for a family was $46,585. Males had a median income of $36,391 versus $26,943 for females. The per capita income for the city was $19,785. About 9.5% of families and 13.1% of the population were below the poverty line, including 17.6% of those under 18 and 7.2% of those 65 or over.

== Government and infrastructure ==
The Dickinson City Hall is located at 4403 Highway 3 and the Dickinson Public Library is located at 4411 Highway 3. The Dickinson Police Department is located at 4000 Liggio Street. Fire stations are located at 4500 FM 517 East, which also houses EMS, and 221 FM 517 West. The fire department is run by volunteers. The Dickinson Post Office is located at 2515 Termini Street.

The National Weather Service Houston/Galveston Office and the Galveston Office of Emergency Management share a facility in League City; the facility has a Dickinson postal address.

Dickinson funds the organization Bayou Animal Services, which is an animal shelter and provides animal services. The facility, operated by Texas Animal Control Solutions, opened in 2015. Prior to that year, Dickinson used the Galveston County Health District's Animal Resource Center in Texas City. Dickinson had ended its contract with the Galveston County Health District for animal services.

== Education ==
=== Public schools ===
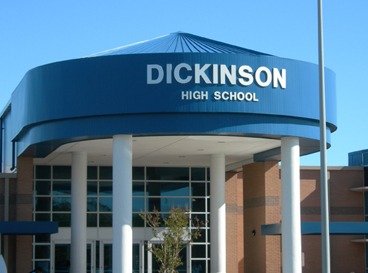
Dickinson High School

Dickinson, Texas water tower

Most of Dickinson is a part of the Dickinson Independent School District. Some of it is a part of the Santa Fe Independent School District.

These schools serve the Dickinson ISD portion:

- Elementary schools (prekindergarten–grade 3)
  - Calder Road Elementary School
  - Bay Colony Elementary School
  - Hughes Road Elementary School
  - Jake Sibernagel Elementary School
  - K. E. Little Elementary School serves Bacliff portion of DISD
  - San Leon Elementary School serves San Leon portion of DISD
  - Louis G. Lobit Elementary School
- Middle schools
  - John and Shamarion Barber Middle School (grades 4-5)
  - Dunbar Middle School
  - Elva C. Lobit Middle School
- Junior high schools
  - R.D. McAdams Junior High School (grades 6-8)
  - Eugene Kranz Junior High School
  - Dickinson Junior High School
- High schools
  - Dickinson High School (grades 9-12)

Before the 2004–2005 school year, all DISD elementary schools provided education for prekindergarten through grade 5, but Barber Elementary School was turned into a middle school center for fifth grade from the 2004/05 school year to the 2007/08 school year. For the 2008/09 school year, a newly built Barber Middle School built off FM 517 and Dunbar Middle School (which previously only held the sixth grade) was set to both hold grades five and six. Students were to be separated into schools based on where they resided.

As of the 2023-2024 school year. two new junior high schools were built. The Eugene 'Gene' Kranz Junior High School opened in 2018 serving grades seven and eight until the start of the 23–24 school year, and Dickinson Junior High who along with Kranz Junior High now serves 6th-8th grade as of the 2023–2024 school year. All the elementaries now serve prekindergarten through third-grade students, and all middle schools servegrades four and five..

Bay Area Charter Middle School is a state charter school in Dickinson.

=== Private schools ===
True Cross Catholic School, a Roman Catholic prekindergarten through grade eight school operated by the Roman Catholic Archdiocese of Galveston-Houston, is in Dickinson. True Cross School was the first Roman Catholic school on the Galveston County mainland. The school was unusable due to Hurricane Harvey. The students attended classes at Our Lady of Fatima in Texas City, Texas. The school reopened for the 2019–2020 school year.

Queen of Angels Academy, a school of the Society of St. Pius X, is located at the original Holy Cross location, and provides a classical Catholic education. Queen of Angels parish also has the traditional Latin Mass daily. Although the church structure was built in 1947, the interior has been renovated to reflect the church's attachment to Catholic tradition.

=== Colleges and universities ===
Dickinson is served by the College of the Mainland, a community college in Texas City.

=== Public libraries ===
Dickinson Public Library, operated by the city, is located at 4411 Highway 3.

== Parks and recreation ==
The Galveston County Department of Parks and Senior Services operates the Dickinson Community Center at 2714 Highway 3.

Dickinson Bayou is a bayou that flows in and out of the city of Dickinson.

Parks are numerous around the city. Paul Hopkins Park on 517 is host to the Festival of Lights each December. Elva Lobit Park and Zempter Park are parks that host the city's youth baseball leagues. A state-maintained boat dock is present at the Highway 3 and 146 bridges.

== Notable people ==
- Bill Gurley, venture capitalist, is originally from Dickinson.
- Gene Kranz, NASA flight director during the Gemini and Apollo programs, is from the city.
- Donnie Little is a former American football quarterback and the first Black quarterback to play for the University of Texas.
- Tracy Scoggins is a Hollywood actress born in the city.
- Andre Ware, 1989 Heisman Trophy winner (University of Houston, quarterback) and former professional football player grew up in the area.
