= Bayport =

Bayport may refer to:

== Places ==
=== Canada ===
- Bayport, Nova Scotia

=== United States ===
- Bayport, Florida
- Bayport, Minnesota
- Bayport, New York
  - Bayport (LIRR station), a station stop along the Montauk Branch of the Long Island Rail Road
- Bayport, Wisconsin, a former town
- Bayport Container Terminal of the Port of Houston
- Bayport Industrial District near La Porte and Pasadena, Texas
- Cos Cob, Connecticut, had the official Post Office name of Bayport

== Other uses ==
- Bayport (The Hardy Boys), the fictional setting for the Hardy Boys series of young-adult detective novels

== See also ==
- Bay Port, Michigan
