= Texas State Highway 225 =

Highway in Texas

State Highway 225
- SH 225, highlighted in red

Route information
- Maintained by TxDOT
- Length: 15.6 mi (25.1 km)
- Existed: 1935–present

Major junctions
- West end: Broadway & Lawndale Streets at Houston
- I-610 in Houston; Beltway 8 / Sam Houston Tollway in Pasadena
- East end: SH 146 in La Porte

Location
- Country: United States
- State: Texas

Highway system
- Highways in Texas; Interstate; US; State; Former; Toll; Loops; Spurs; FM/RM; Park; Rec
← SH 224	→ SH 226

State Highway 225 (SH 225) is an east–west freeway in the Houston area between the Interstate 610 Loop in Houston and State Highway 146/future State Highway 99 in La Porte. It is identified as the La Porte Freeway over its entire length. The freeway passes near several refineries, chemical plants, and tank farms as it passes through La Porte and Deer Park.

== History ==
The La Porte-Houston highway was dedicated in 1929, following a route along most of the current alignment. The highway was designated on December 21, 1935, with the western terminus of the route at US 75.

The first section of freeway along the route was authorized in 1945 and opened in 1952. It connected the Gulf Freeway (then still designated US 75) with the La Porte-Houston highway. The Texas Department of Transportation (TxDOT) officially designated the new freeway section as part of SH 225 on August 25, 1954, with the western terminus now at State Highway 35.

The alignment for the freeway replacement of the La Porte-Houston highway was set during the 1950s. The route passed through a part of Milby Park, which caused legal problems due to a clause in the will that deeded the park land to the city. The city of Houston refused to sell the right-of-way, so TxDOT acquired it via condemnation, triggering a lawsuit by Milby's daughter that was resolved in 1961.

Construction of the freeway began in 1964, with sections completed through 1970. Construction halted due to funding issues in the 1970s, resumed again in the early 1980s, halted again in 1984, and was finally complete in 2000.

On April 2, 1969, TxDOT extended the route of SH 225 to US 59 in downtown Houston, in anticipation of construction of the Harrisburg Freeway (see below), replacing Spur 97, and the section of SH 225 from Spur 97 to SH 35 became part of I-610.

=== The Harrisburg Freeway ===
The Harrisburg Freeway is the name of a once-planned freeway extension of SH 225 into downtown Houston. The extension was never completed due to lack of funding and neighborhood opposition along its proposed route.

The extension was originally proposed in a 1960 traffic study, with the aim of relieving congestion on the Gulf Freeway. The recommended alignment followed Harrisburg Boulevard through a predominantly Hispanic neighborhood. In 1962, TxDOT agreed to build interchanges for the proposed freeway at Interstate 610 and the terminus at US 59 (the planned western terminus is located east of present-day Minute Maid Park). In 1969, after delaying for several years due to a backlog in freeway construction, the Texas Transportation Commission put the Harrisburg Freeway in the state highway system.

As the process of selecting the route and obtaining approval for the freeway began, neighborhood activists proposed an alternate route from the one tentatively proposed. The alternate route would skirt the neighborhood, running near the Houston Ship Channel and Buffalo Bayou. As planning continued, opposition developed over both the original route and a short-lived 1979 proposal by the Texas Turnpike Authority to make the freeway a tollway. The competing routes remained under study until 1973, when the original route was announced as the recommended alignment. The route was approved by the Houston-Galveston Area Council, despite appeals from neighborhood activists.

However, the construction never got off the ground. The environmental impact statement for the project was rejected by the United States Environmental Protection Agency, and TxDOT put the project on hold due to a shortage of highway funds. The Harrisburg Freeway was never revived, and the city of Houston finally deleted it from the Major Thoroughfare and Freeway Plan.

== Route description ==
SH 225 is a freeway located in Greater Houston that links the southeast side of Houston with Pasadena, Deer Park, and La Porte. The freeway lanes begin just inside the I-610 inner beltway of Houston at Broadway Street and Lawndale Street. It heads east to an interchange with I-610 before continuing through the southeast side of Houston. The freeway enters Pasadena and passes through the northern portions of the city as it runs to the south of the Houston Ship Channel. It continues east to the Sam Houston Tollway before it enters the city limits of Deer Park. The freeway does not interchange with any other state highways in Deer Park, but it does have an exit at Independence Parkway (former SH 134) which provides access to San Jacinto Battleground State Historic Site. The freeway continues to the east to its eastern terminus at an interchange with SH 146/future SH 99 in La Porte just south of the Fred Hartman Bridge.

== Exit list ==
The entire route is in Harris County. All exits are unnumbered.

Location	mi	km	Destinations	Notes
Houston			Broadway Street, Lawndale Street	Western terminus
Houston			I-610 (South Loop Freeway, East Loop Freeway)	I-610 exits 30B-C; no access to IH 610 northbound from SH 225 eastbound
Houston			Goodyear Drive	Westbound exit is via the Allen-Genoa Road exit
Houston			Allen-Genoa Road	No eastbound exit
Houston			Scarborough Lane	Westbound exit is via the Richey Street exit
Pasadena			Richey Street	
Pasadena			Shaver Street	Eastbound exit and westbound entrance
Pasadena			Pasadena Boulevard, Red Bluff Road	
Pasadena			Bearle Street	
Pasadena			Preston Road	Eastbound exit is via the Bearle Street exit
Pasadena			Beltway 8 (Frontage Road) / Sam Houston Tollway	
Deer Park			Deer Park	Eastbound exit and westbound entrance
Deer Park			Center Street	Westbound exit is via the Tidal Road exit
Deer Park			Tidal Road	
Deer Park			East Boulevard/Rohm & Haas Road	Westbound exit is via the Battleground Road exit
Deer Park			Independence Parkway	Former SH 134
La Porte			Miller Cut-Off Road	
La Porte			Sens Road, Strang Road	
La Porte			SH 146 – La Porte, Baytown	Eastern terminus; tri-stack interchange, SH 146 will be co-signed with SH 99 in the future
1.000 mi = 1.609 km; 1.000 km = 0.621 mi: Incomplete access
