= Barbours Cut Terminal =

Barbours Cut Container Terminal
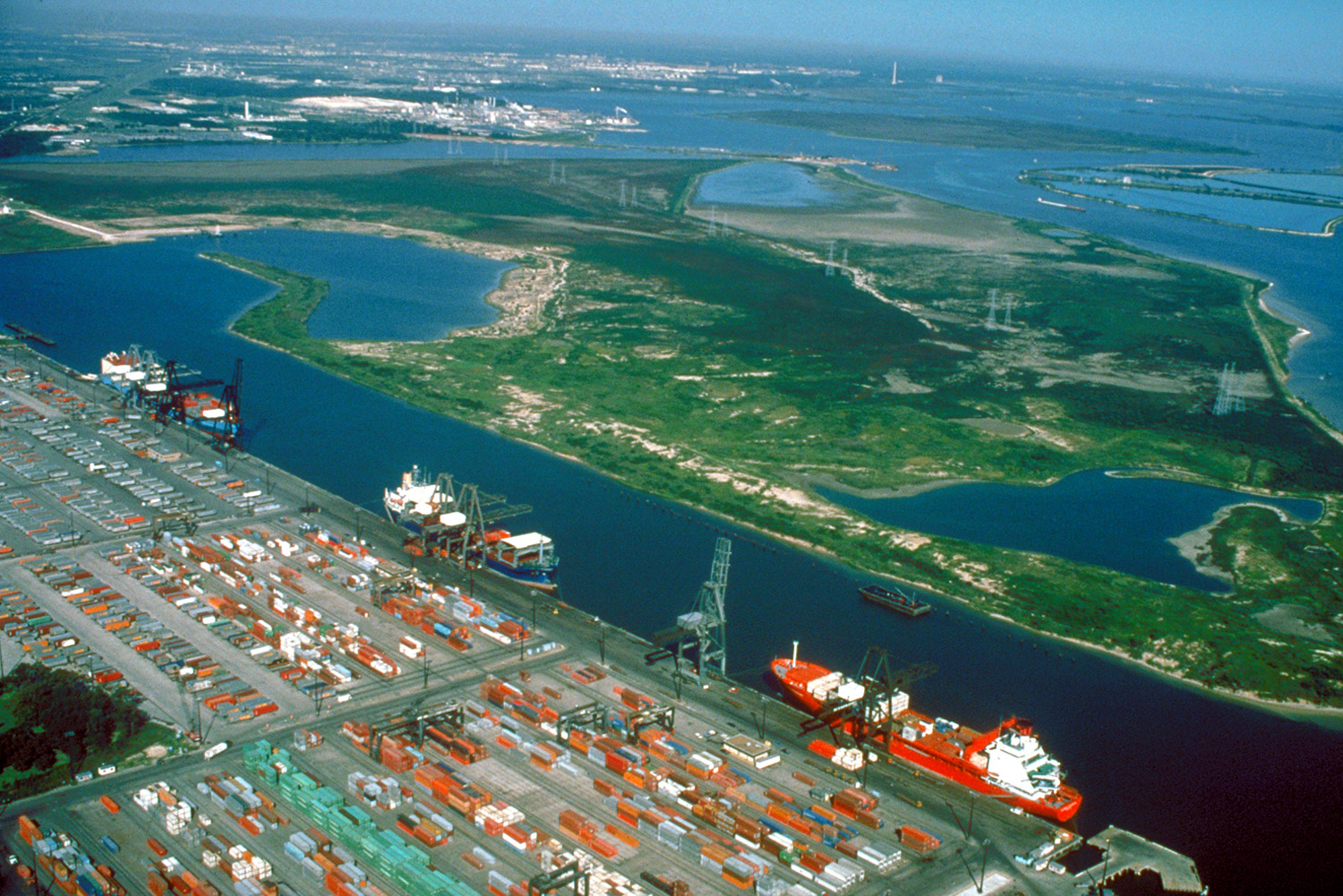
- The terminal along the Barbours Cut Ship Channel and the Houston Ship Channel

Location
- Country: United States
- Location: Morgan's Point, Texas
- Coordinates: 29°40′55″N 94°59′54″W

Details
- Opened: 1977
- Operated by: Port of Houston Authority
- Owned by: City of Houston
- Type of harbour: Natural / artificial
- Land area: 250 acres (100 ha)
- No. of berths: 6
- No. of wharfs: 6,000 feet (1,800 m)
- Loading area: 230 acres (93 ha)
- Warehouse space: 255,000 square feet (23,700 m^{2})

Statistics
- Annual cargo tonnage: 15.4 million short tons / 17.0 million metric tons (2007)
- Website http://www.portofhouston.com

The Barbours Cut Container Terminal, or simply the Barbours Cut Terminal, is a major deep water port in the Greater Houston area in the U.S. state of Texas. It is part of one of the world's busiest ports by cargo tonnage.

== Geography ==
Barbours Cut is situated along the Barbours Cut Ship Channel, between La Porte and Morgan's Point, Texas. This channel, located at the mouth of Buffalo Bayou on Galveston Bay, is itself a tributary to the larger Houston Ship Channel, which runs from Houston, through the bay, to the Gulf of Mexico. It is located approximately 27 miles (43 km) from downtown Houston.

The terminal is located near the Battleground Industrial District, a major industrial complex in the jurisdiction of La Porte.

== History ==
Opened in 1977, the Barbours Cut Terminal was built at a cost of US$53 million (US$275 million in today's terms). The new terminal had a distinct geographical advantage over the old Turning Basin terminal. Whereas Turning Basin, situated upriver at the navigational head of Buffalo Bayou, is 6 hours or more from the Gulf, Barbours Cut requires only three hours travel time.

In 2007 the terminal handled 15.4 million short tons (17.0 million metric tons) of cargo including more than one million cargo containers. The terminal both directly and indirectly contributes thousands of jobs to the Galveston Bay Area and is a key factor in the economy of Greater Houston.

== Description ==
Part of the larger Port of Houston complex, Barbours Cut is the largest of the terminals and the first port in Texas to handle standardized cargo containers.

The terminal has six berths with 6,000 feet (1,800 m) of continuous wharfs. The loading area covers 230 acres (93 ha), with 255,000 square feet (23,700 m^{2}) of warehouse/storage space. The channel depth is 40 feet (12 m) at low tide.

The facilities at Barbours Cut include a cruise ship terminal. Until 2007 Norwegian Cruise Line ran cruises from this terminal but currently there are no cruise lines operating from the terminal.

== Environmental issues ==
Barbours Cut was the first port in the United States to implement the ISO 14001 environmental management standard, a rigorous set of requirements for minimizing a business' effects on the environment. Nevertheless, the Natural Resources Defense Council, an environmental advocacy group, has given Barbours Cut and the Port of Houston a grade of "F" citing "its deplorable treatment of local residents and its few noteworthy programs to reduce the effects of its operations on air and water quality."

== See also ==
- Bayport Terminal
- Port of Galveston
- Port of Houston
- Port of Texas City
