= San Jacinto Ordnance Depot =

The San Jacinto Ordnance Depot was a World War II facility built on an almost 5,000 acres (2,000 ha) site located on the Houston Ship Channel, approximately 15 miles (24 km) southeast of downtown Houston, Texas. The job of the depot was to support the U.S. Army and U.S. Navy by storing and inspecting ammunition received from manufacturers that was being shipped through the Port of Houston docks, and storing and inspecting ammunition received from domestic U.S. military bases and areas of overseas operations.

The depot also supported Army and Navy operations for a short while after World War II, but plans were made to gradually phase out the depot's mission. Before the depot could be shut down, the United States became involved in the Korean War, and plans to cease operations were postponed. The depot was finally determined to be unnecessary in 1959, and the United States Army Corps of Engineers was given control and responsibility of the site. The land and facilities of the depot were sold to the Houston Channel Industrial Corporation in October 1964.
