= Baytown Tunnel =

Demolished tunnel under the Houston Ship Channel in Texas, US

Coordinates: 29°42′20″N 95°01′01″W

- Interactive map of Baytown Tunnel

Overview
- Other name: Baytown – La Porte Tunnel
- Location: Baytown
- Status: Demolished
- Start: Baytown
- End: La Porte

Operation
- Opened: September 1953
- Closed: 1995

Technical
- Design engineer: U.S. Army Corps of Engineers
- Length: 4,110 ft (1,250 m)
- No. of lanes: 2
- Min elevation: 40 feet
- Width: 530 ft (160 m)

The Baytown Tunnel or Baytown – La Porte Tunnel was a two-lane underwater motor-vehicle tunnel connecting Baytown and La Porte, two suburbs of Houston, Texas. Completed in 1953, it traveled northeast-southwest underneath the Houston Ship Channel and had a length of 4,110 feet (1,250 m). It was closed to vehicular traffic in 1995 with the opening of the Fred Hartman Bridge, and subsequently demolished beginning in 1997 in order for the U.S. Army Corps of Engineers to deepen the channel in 1998.

The Fred Hartman Bridge had been designed to replace the Baytown Tunnel (of depth clearance 40 feet (12.2 m)), which had to be removed when the Houston Ship Channel was deepened to 45 feet (13.7 m), with a minimum 530 feet (161.5 m) bottom width, to accommodate larger ships. The last section of the Baytown Tunnel was removed on September 14, 1999, with removal of the tunnel being the responsibility of the Texas Department of Transportation.

== History ==
Conceived and constructed as a means to improve traffic circulation, the tunnel opened in September 1953 as a replacement facility for the now-defunct Morgans Point Ferry at a final cost of $10 million. The land where the tunnel entered and exited was leased from Exxon by the state for an annual fee of $1.

The tunnel consisted of prefabricated sections that were sunk into place on the floor of the channel. The completed facility had a diameter of 36 feet (11 m) complete with a 1 inch (25 mm) steel shell with a 2 foot (0.61 m) concrete lining. The actual roadbed inside was flat with a ventilation shaft running beneath its surface. The 300 and 250 feet long pipe sections of diameter 34 feet, 10 inches were fabricated by the Orange, Texas plant of Consolidated Western Steel.

It served as a connection between State Highway 146 and State Highway 225 on the south to State Highway 146 and Loop 201 to the north. By the 1970s the tunnel had exceeded its capacity of 25,000 vehicles a day and in 1986 the Texas Department of Highways and Public Transportation awarded a contract for its replacement with an eight-lane cable-stayed bridge. With the closure of the tunnel occurring in 1995, a clause in the original tunnel permit issued by the corps called for the Department of Transportation to remove the facility if it became unused or abandoned.

By 1997 a proposal was made to dismantle the unused facility in 350 feet (110 m) long sections, float them down the channel and sink each section in 100 feet (30 m) of water at the Freeport Liberty Ship Reef in creating an artificial reef for marine wildlife in the Gulf of Mexico. This plan was scrapped due to both high costs in addition to the process resulting in over 50 closures of the channel to complete. The tunnel was removed by 1998 and its former structure was salvaged as paving aggregate.
