= Bayport Industrial District =

- Industrial district
- Interactive map of Bayport Industrial District
- Coordinates: 29°37′N 95°3′W
- Country: United States
- State: Texas
- County: Harris

Area
  - Total: 7.3 sq mi (19 km^{2})
- Time zone: UTC-6 (Central (CST))
  - Summer (DST): UTC-5 (CDT)
- Area code: 281

The Bayport Industrial District is a large commercial real-estate development located in southeast Harris County, Texas, within the Bay Area of Greater Houston. It is one of the two industrial districts in the extraterritorial jurisdiction of La Porte (the other being the Battleground Industrial District). It is located adjacent to both La Porte and Seabrook, Texas.

In 1965 the City of Pasadena and the City of Houston both annexed an area that included the site of Bayport resulting in a lawsuit between Pasadena and City of Houston. Houston was joined by Harris County and Humble Oil & Refining Company in the lawsuit. In 1969 the Supreme Court of Texas reversed lower court rulings that had sustained Houston's motion for summary judgment and upheld the validity of Pasadena's 1965 annexation of the disputed territory.

In 1970 the City of Pasadena created an industrial district that included the Bayport complex. The development, created in 1970, is among the largest private industrial complexes in the United States. The leading center for chemical processing in the Houston area, Bayport contains more than 60 chemical plants. Businesses located in this district can receive tax incentives from Harris County, La Porte, and Pasadena. As of 2007 local business volume for Bayport-related enterprises exceeds $829 million annually with 11,000 jobs directly attributable to the complex. Additionally the Bay Area Houston Economic Partnership estimates that for every job created within the complex approximately 3.79 related jobs are created on average outside the district. Thus the district represents a key economic pillar of the communities in the area.

Major facilities in the district include the LyondellBasell site, the Celanese/Air Products/Clariant/Dow/Arkema site, and the Albemarle/Akzo Nobel site.

Adjacent to the industrial complex is the new Bayport Terminal, which contains both a major new cargo container shipping terminal and a cruise ship terminal. This port is operated by the Port of Houston Authority.

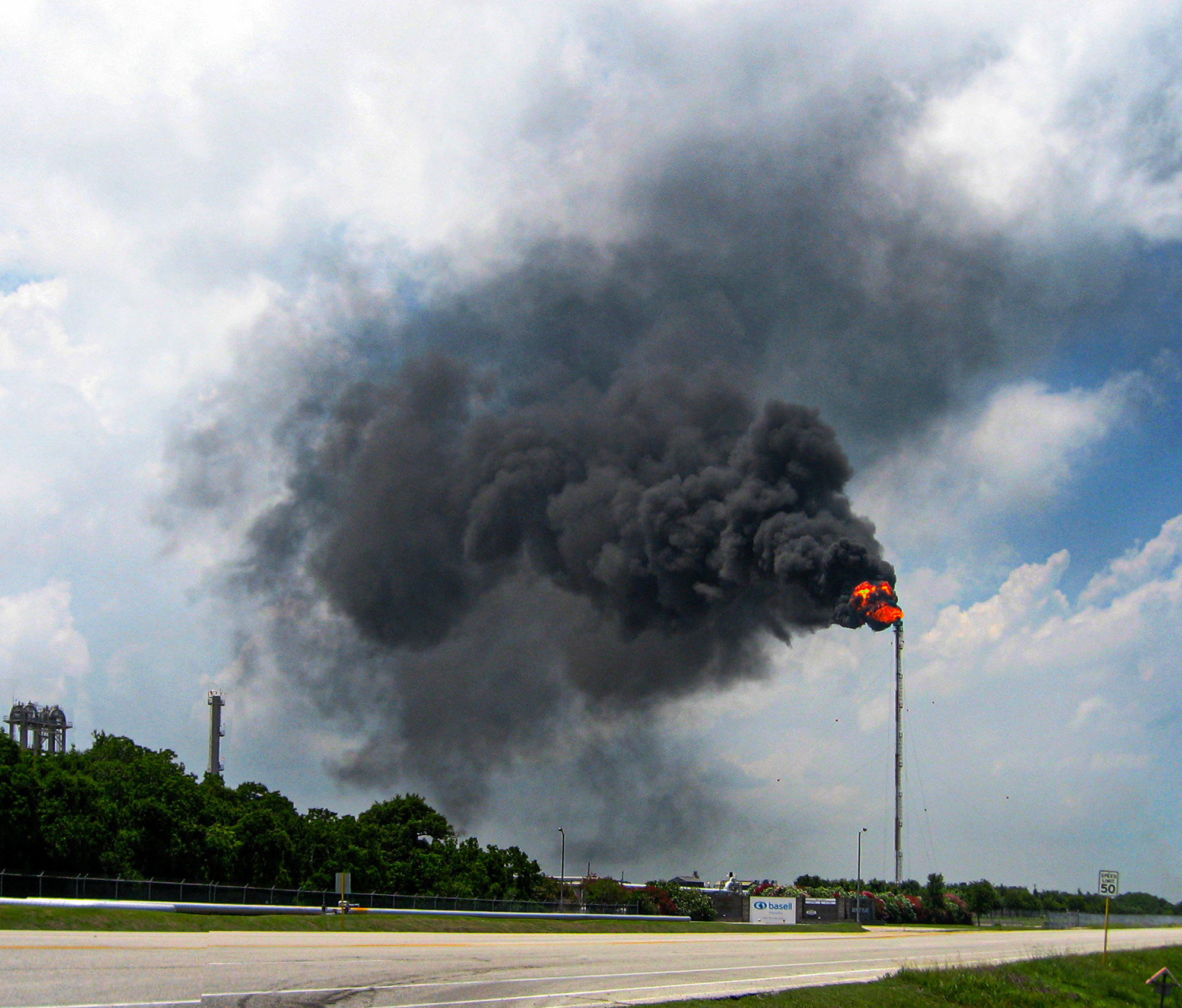
Flare, Bayport Industrial District, Harris County, Texas
