= La Porte, Texas =

City of La Porte
- City
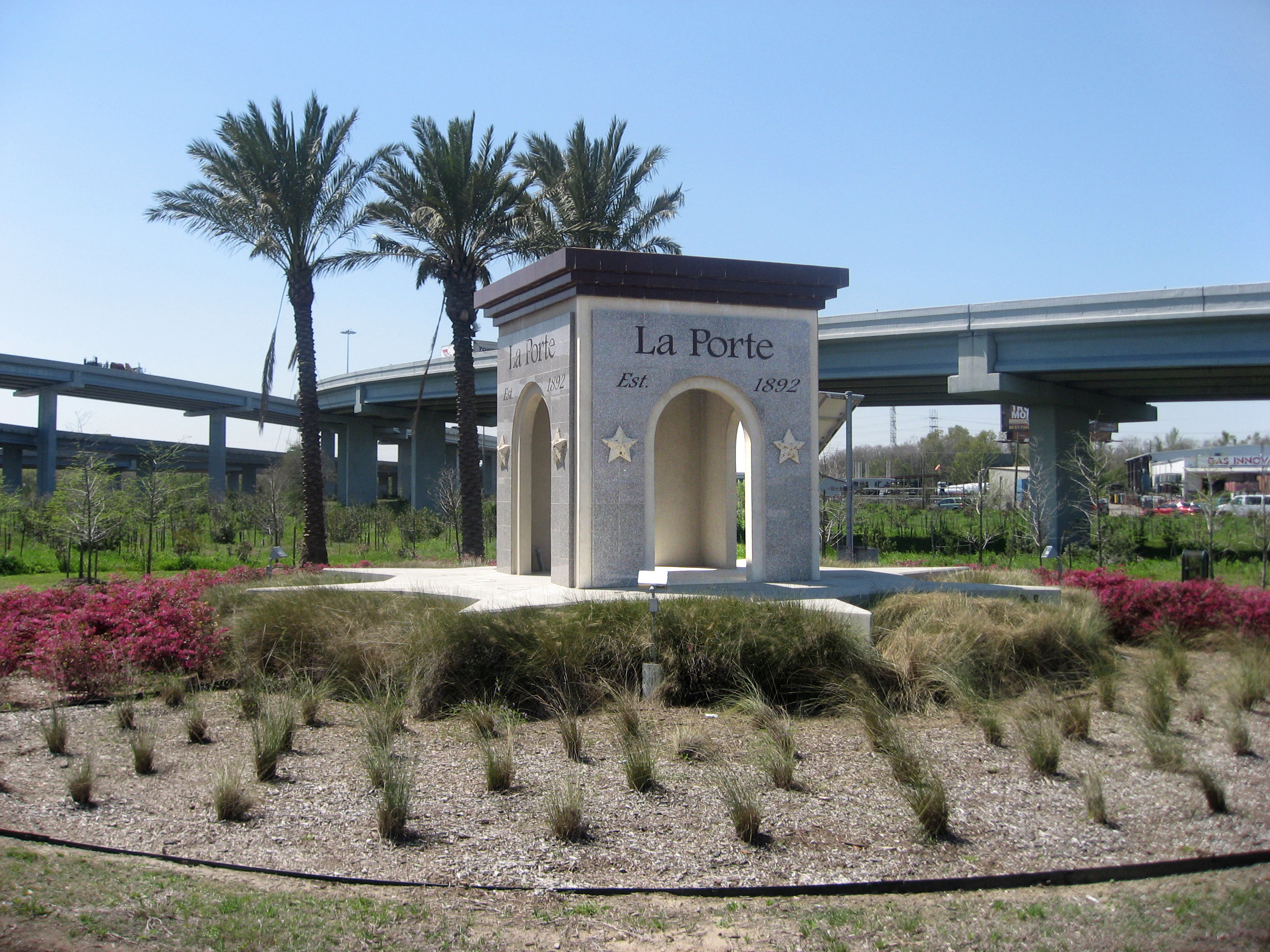
- Welcome to La Porte
- Nickname: "L.P."
- Location in Harris County and the state of Texas
- Coordinates: 29°39′56″N 95°1′10″W
- Country: United States
- State: Texas
- County: Harris, Chambers (water only)

Government
  - Type: Council-Manager
  - Mayor: Rick Helton
  - City Council: List: John P. Zemanek; Dottie Kaminski; Danny Earp; Chuck Engelken; Daryl Leonard; Tommy Moser; Jay Martin; Mike Clausen
  - City Manager: Corby Alexander

Area
  - Total: 19.90 sq mi (51.55 km^{2})
  - Land: 18.60 sq mi (48.18 km^{2})
  - Water: 1.30 sq mi (3.36 km^{2})
- Elevation: 20 ft (6 m)

Population (2020)
  - Total: 35,124
  - Density: 1,880/sq mi (725.9/km^{2})
- Time zone: UTC-6 (Central (CST))
  - Summer (DST): UTC-5 (CDT)
- ZIP codes: 77571-77572
- Area codes: 713, 281, 832, 346, 621
- FIPS code: 48-41440
- GNIS feature ID: 2411580
- Website: Official website

La Porte (/lə ˈpɔːrt/ lə PORT) is a city in Harris County, Texas, United States, within the Bay Area of the Houston–Pasadena–The Woodlands metropolitan area. Areas of water under La Porte jurisdiction are in Chambers County. As of the 2020 census, the city population was 35,124. La Porte is the fourth-largest incorporated city in Harris County.

When La Porte celebrated its centennial in 1992, it was the home of Barbours Cut Terminal, operated by the Port of Houston Authority since 1977. Fifteen years later, the Port of Houston's newest addition, Bayport Terminal, was established just south of La Porte. The area around La Porte has served an increasingly important role in international trade since the 1970s.

The area around modern La Porte gained fame early in Texas history as the location of the Battle of San Jacinto on April 21, 1836, which ended the Texas Revolution, establishing the independence of the Republic of Texas from Mexico. The San Jacinto Monument, in the unincorporated area near La Porte, commemorates the battle. During the early 20th century, particularly the 1920s and 1930s, La Porte's Sylvan Beach became a nationally known tourist destination attracting some of the nation's most well-known entertainers. As a result of changing economics in the Houston area and beach erosion, the tourist business declined while industrial development in the area grew. During World War II and afterward, La Porte's economy rapidly shifted toward petroleum/petrochemicals and shipping, which developed as the dominant industries in the Pasadena-Baytown area.

== History ==
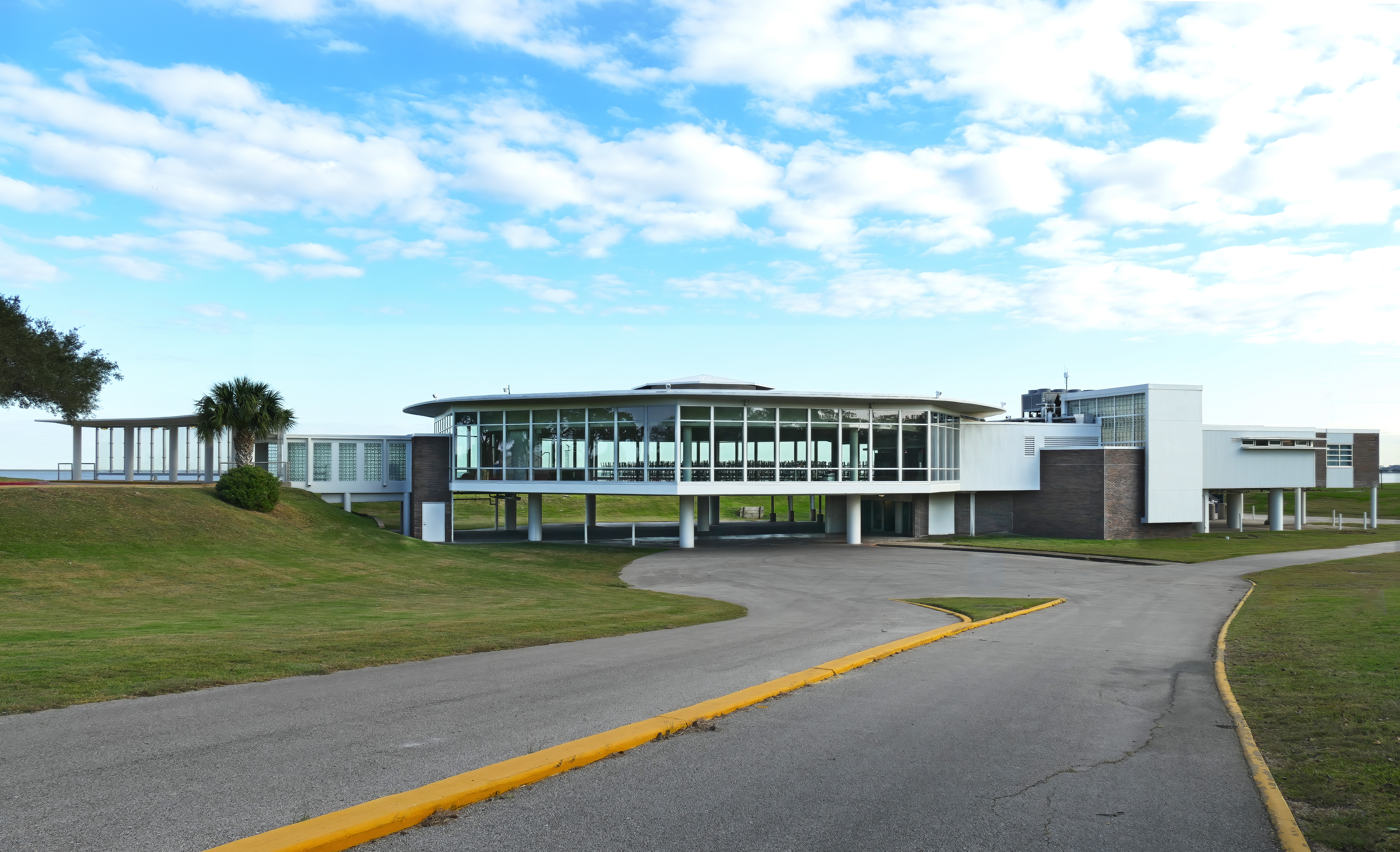
Sylvan Beach Pavilion

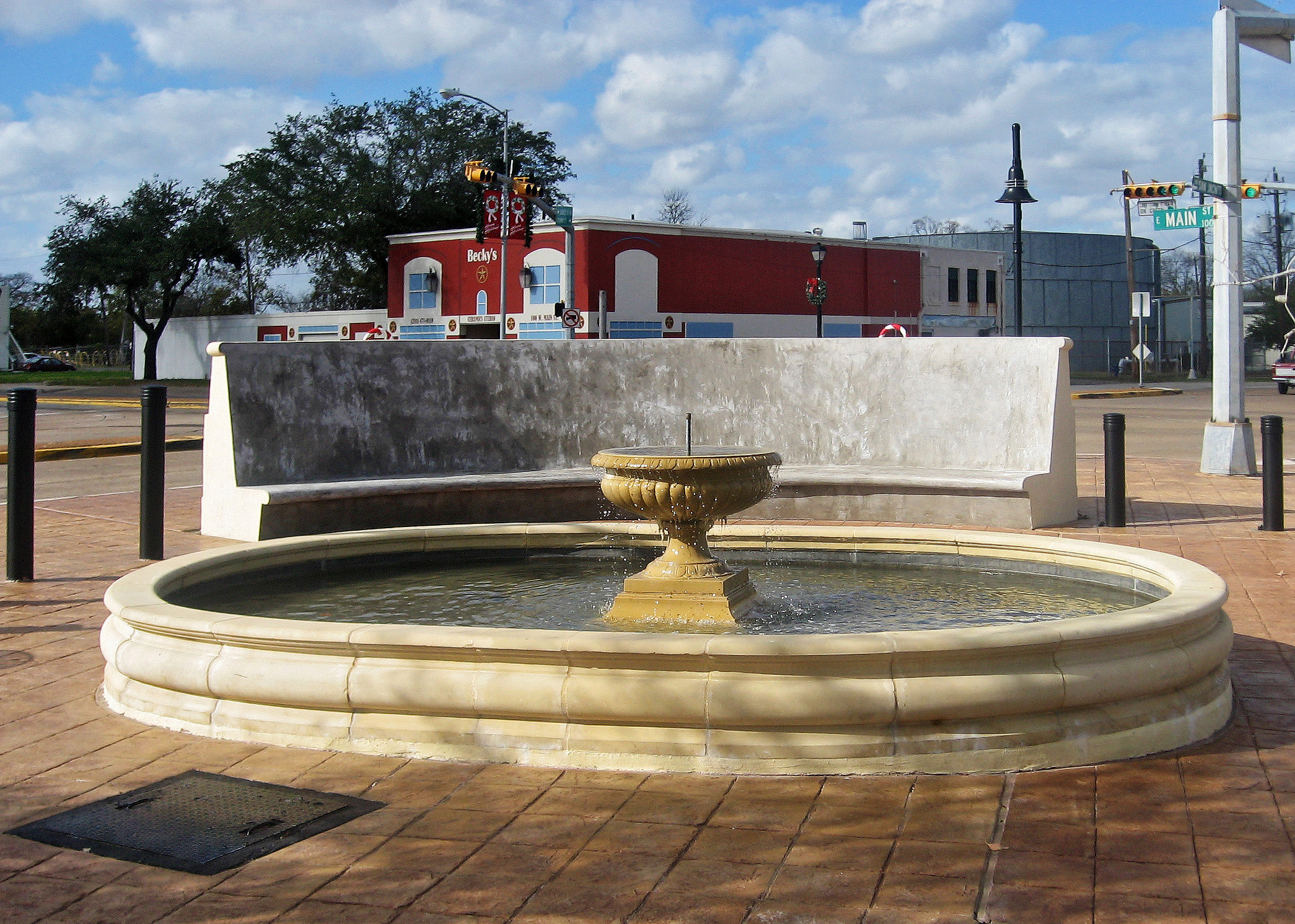
Five Points Plaza in La Porte

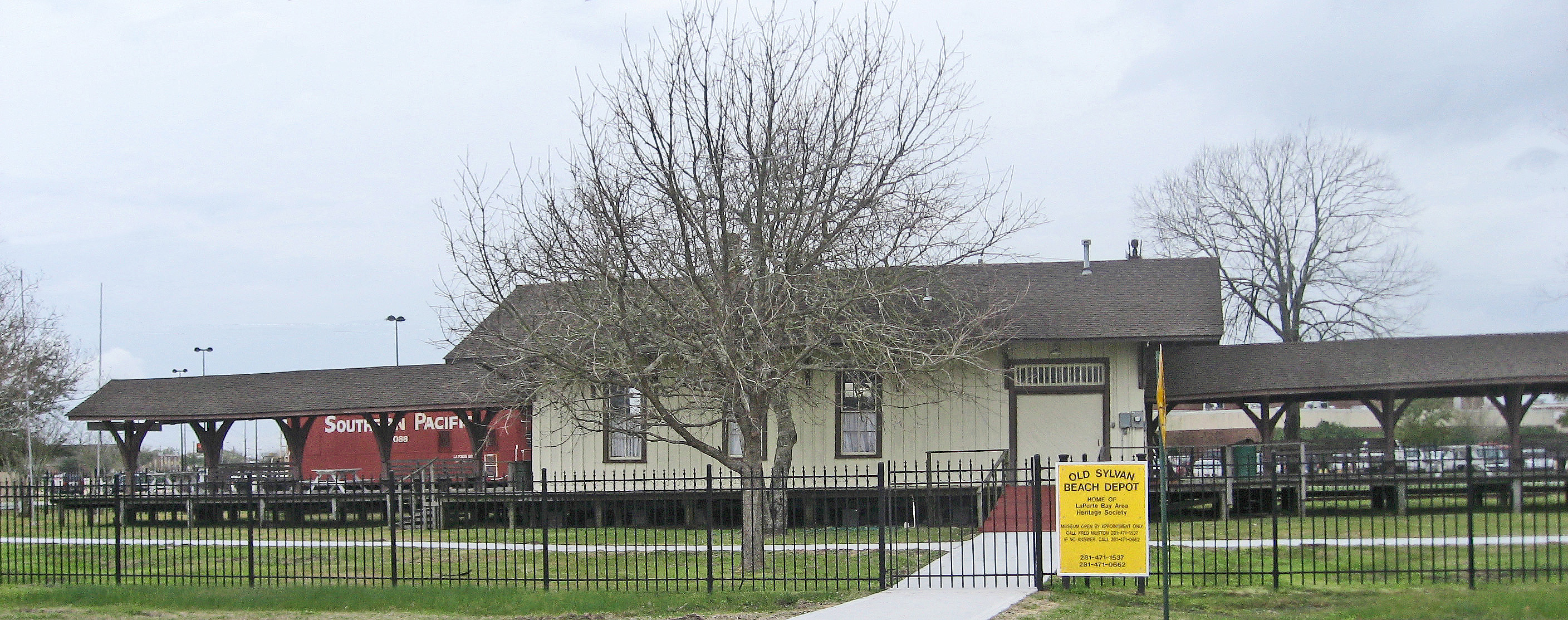
Old Sylvan Beach Depot

The community of La Porte was founded in 1892 as a speculative real estate venture by an investment group. A 22-acre (0.089 km^{2}) public space known as Sylvan Grove was reserved by the waterfront. The area around Sylvan Grove soon was developed with amenities including bathhouses, boating piers, and a Victorian hotel with a dance pavilion. La Porte quickly became the most popular tourist destination in the Houston area. Sylvan Grove Park was acquired in 1896 by a company known as Adoue and Lobit and renamed Sylvan Beach. Cottage retreats were built around the waterfront.

In 1900, the devastating Galveston Hurricane hit the shoreline, seriously damaging the community's attractions. As the Texas Oil Boom took hold beginning in 1901, and neighboring Houston became home to many wealthy businessmen, La Porte quickly rebuilt and re-established itself as a tourist center. It was, however, damaged again by a major fire and another hurricane in 1915. The community rebuilt again.

During the 1920s and 1930s Sylvan Beach Amusement Park became a nationally recognized destination, featuring beauty contests and regular performances by famous bands, in addition to a growing gallery of amenities. Some of the most well-known performers of the era, including Guy Lombardo, the Dorsey Brothers, Phil Harris, and Benny Goodman, appeared at the park. In the 1930s the park was completely revamped, with additions of a large boardwalk, amusement rides, and many other attractions. The residential community remained small, supported exclusively by Sylvan Beach tourism and the nearby Bay Ridge community, an area of beachfront summer homes in neighboring Morgan's Point built by wealthy Houstonians.

The beachfront began to physically shrink beginning around 1928 because of erosion from the wakes of shipping traffic, and land subsidence resulting from the extraction of groundwater in the area due to development. Gas rationing in World War II slowed tourism. A hurricane in 1943 destroyed most of the tourist attractions. Most of the damaged structures at Sylvan Beach were never rebuilt after this time, as the area was changing, and La Porte's tourist industry rapidly declined. By the later 20th century, erosion had completely eliminated the beach.

As shipyards and industrial plants in World War II were developed in nearby communities such as Pasadena, Baytown, and Deer Park, the community's residents became more dependent on these businesses. The opening of the La Porte-Baytown tunnel in 1954 further spurred development. The later establishment of the Johnson Space Center in the nearby Clear Lake Area, the Barbours Cut shipping terminal in neighboring Morgan's Point, and the Bayport Industrial District within La Porte's jurisdiction have gradually made the community successful as part of the Houston area's industrial heartland.

Much of the history of La Porte's glory years as a tourist haven has been preserved by the La Porte Bay Area Heritage Society. Plans have been discussed for many years to restore La Porte's status as a tourist destination. A project to restore the beachfront at Sylvan Beach Park began in 2009 and finished in 2013, with sand brought in from other areas and dredging operations. Other plans, including building a large hotel on the shoreline, have been discussed as well.

== Geography ==
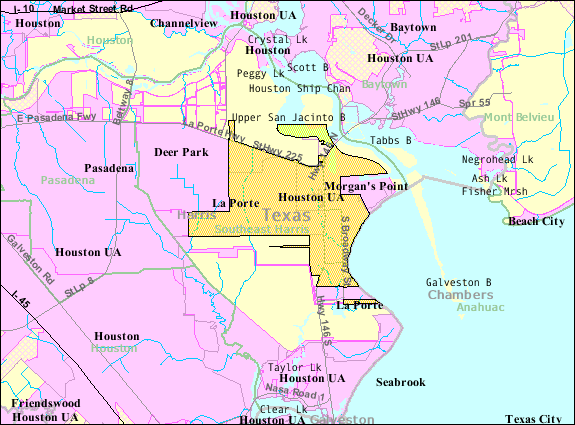
Map of La Porte

According to the United States Census Bureau, the city has a total area of 20.0 sq mi (51.8 km^{2}), of which 1.4 sq mi (3.6 km^{2}), or 6.91%, is covered by water.

La Porte has many small, 1940s, frame houses.

=== Climate ===
The climate in this area is characterized by hot, humid summers and generally mild to cool winters. According to the Köppen climate classification, La Porte has a humid subtropical climate, Cfa on climate maps.

=== Communities ===
La Porte contains many communities. Lomax was once a separate jurisdiction, but was annexed by La Porte.

Shoreacres joined La Porte in 2026.

== Demographics ==
Historical population
Census	Pop.	Note	%±
1900	537		—
1910	678		26.3%
1920	889		31.1%
1930	1,280		44.0%
1940	3,072		140.0%
1950	4,429		44.2%
1960	4,512		1.9%
1970	7,149		58.4%
1980	14,062		96.7%
1990	27,910		98.5%
2000	31,880		14.2%
2010	33,800		6.0%
2020	35,124		3.9%
U.S. Decennial Census

=== Racial and ethnic composition ===
La Porte city, Texas – Racial and ethnic composition Note: the US Census treats Hispanic/Latino as an ethnic category. This table excludes Latinos from the racial categories and assigns them to a separate category. Hispanics/Latinos may be of any race.
Race / Ethnicity (NH = Non-Hispanic)	Pop 2000	Pop 2010	Pop 2020	% 2000	% 2010	% 2020
White alone (NH)	22,529	20,802	18,233	70.67%	61.54%	51.91%
Black or African American alone (NH)	1,941	2,003	1,991	6.09%	5.93%	5.67%
Native American or Alaska Native alone (NH)	131	139	128	0.41%	0.41%	0.36%
Asian alone (NH)	344	387	364	1.08%	1.14%	1.04%
Native Hawaiian or Pacific Islander alone (NH)	21	30	15	0.07%	0.09%	0.04%
Other race alone (NH)	46	39	171	0.14%	0.12%	0.49%
Mixed race or Multiracial (NH)	348	468	1,177	1.09%	1.38%	3.35%
Hispanic or Latino (any race)	6,520	9,932	13,045	20.45%	29.38%	37.14%
Total	31,880	33,800	35,124	100.00%	100.00%	100.00%

=== 2020 census ===
As of the 2020 census, La Porte had a population of 35,124 and a median age of 37.8 years; 23.9% of residents were under the age of 18 and 14.8% of residents were 65 years of age or older. For every 100 females there were 97.6 males, and for every 100 females age 18 and over there were 95.8 males age 18 and over.

100.0% of residents lived in urban areas, while 0.0% lived in rural areas.

There were 12,725 households in La Porte, of which 36.1% had children under the age of 18 living in them. Of all households, 52.1% were married-couple households, 17.0% were households with a male householder and no spouse or partner present, and 24.5% were households with a female householder and no spouse or partner present. About 22.0% of all households were made up of individuals and 9.6% had someone living alone who was 65 years of age or older.

There were 13,481 housing units, of which 5.6% were vacant. The homeowner vacancy rate was 1.6% and the rental vacancy rate was 7.1%.

Racial composition as of the 2020 census
Race	Number	Percent
White	21,943	62.5%
Black or African American	2,109	6.0%
American Indian and Alaska Native	331	0.9%
Asian	387	1.1%
Native Hawaiian and Other Pacific Islander	21	0.1%
Some other race	4,190	11.9%
Two or more races	6,143	17.5%
Hispanic or Latino (of any race)	13,045	37.1%

=== 2000 census ===
As of the census of 2000, 31,880 people, 10,928 households, and 8,578 families were residing in the city. The population density was 1,683.3 people/sq mi (649.9/km^{2}). The 11,720 housing units averaged 618.8/sq mi (238.9/km^{2}). The racial makeup of the city was 81.39% White, 6.25% African American, 0.48% Native American, 1.13% Asian, 0.08% Pacific Islander, 8.52% from other races, and 2.15% from two or more races. About 20.45% of the population was Hispanic or Latino of any race.

Of the 10,928 households, 43.2% had children under 18 living with them, 62.8% were married couples living together, 11.4% had a female householder with no husband present, and 21.5% were not families. About 17.4% of all households were made up of individuals, and 4.6% had someone living alone who was 65 years of age or older. The average household size was 2.90, and the average family size was 3.28.

In the city, the age distribution was 29.7% under 18, 8.9% from 18 to 24, 32.7% from 25 to 44, 21.8% from 45 to 64, and 6.9% who were 65 or older. The median age was 33 years. For every 100 females, there were 98.5 males. For every 100 females age 18 and over, there were 95.0 males.

The median income for a household in the city was $55,810, and for a family was $60,034. Males had a median income of $46,118 versus $29,514 for females. The per capita income for the city was $21,178. About 6.2% of families and 7.5% of the population were below the poverty line, including 8.4% of those under age 18 and 11.2% of those age 65 or over.

== Economy ==
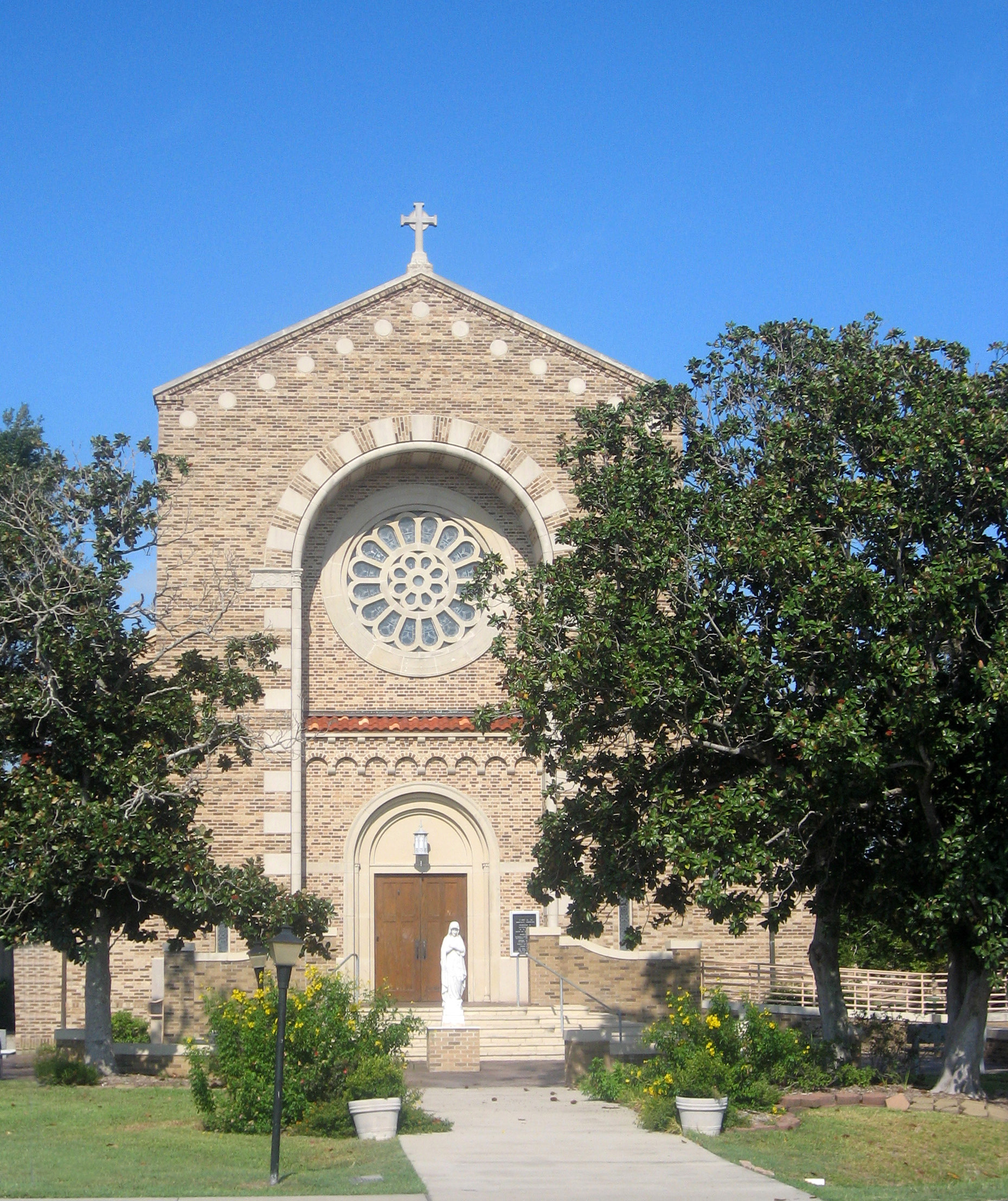
St Mary's Church

The city is located adjacent to three major economic hubs of the Bay Area and Greater Houston: the Bayport Industrial District, the Battleground Industrial District, and the Barbours Cut shipping terminal.

== Government ==
As with the majority of home-rule cities in Texas, La Porte has a charter for a council-manager form of government. The elected council members serve as a legislative body to make policy; they hire the city manager, who is the operating officer for the city. Since 2012, the city manager has been Corby Alexander, from Henderson, Texas. Elections for city council members are held at the same time as for the school board of the city's school district.

The United States Postal Service operates the La Porte Post Office at 801 West Fairmont Parkway.

Harris Health System (formerly Harris County Hospital District) designated Strawberry Health Center in Pasadena for ZIP code 77571. The nearest public hospital is Ben Taub General Hospital in the Texas Medical Center.

== Education ==
Almost all of the municipality is zoned to the La Porte Independent School District, including La Porte High School. Elementary schools include: Jennie Reid Elementary, Rizzuto Elementary, Lomax Elementary, La Porte Elementary, Bayshore Elementary, College Park Elementary, and Heritage Elementary. The secondary schools include Baker Sixth Grade Campus, La Porte Junior High, Lomax Junior High and La Porte High School.

A small piece of the La Porte city limits extends into the Deer Park Independent School District. Residents of La Porte ISD and Deer Park ISD (and therefore La Porte) are zoned to San Jacinto College. A portion of the central campus is in La Porte.

=== Public libraries ===
The city is served by the 23,357-square-foot (2,169.9 m^{2}) La Porte Branch Library of Harris County Public Library (HCPL), located at 600 South Broadway. The library first opened in 1929. The City of La Porte maintains the buildings and furnishings while HCPL staffs and operates the library.

Old Sylvan Beach Depot Museum and Library, operated by archivist Ann Malone and docent Georgia Malone, the former's daughter, includes various archival materials related to La Porte. The former Southern Pacific Railroad depot is the main building and the grounds also include the original La Porte Library building and a caboose.

== Infrastructure ==
=== Transportation ===
Harris County Transit provides public transportation in La Porte.

La Porte Municipal Airport is located in the La Porte city limits.

The closest major airports with commercial airline service are William P. Hobby Airport and George Bush Intercontinental Airport in Houston.

La Porte is linked to Interstate 10 (see map) by State Highway 146, crossing the Fred Hartman Bridge into the nearby city of Baytown; the bridge was built in 1995, replacing the Baytown Tunnel, to allow deepening of the Houston Ship Channel.

La Porte is located on the northwest end of Galveston Bay at the mouth of Buffalo Bayou and the San Jacinto River.

== Notable people ==
- Jessica Boone, an actress, was born in La Porte and attended La Porte High School
- Kerron Clement, Olympic gold and silver medalist (track and field)
- Sarah Emma Edmonds (1841–1898), was a Canadian-born woman who served as a man in the American Civil War under the assumed identity of "Franklin T. Thompson"
- Curvin Richards, was a former NFL running back for the Dallas Cowboys and Detroit Lions
- Shaun Rogers, an NFL player
- Gene Washington, a two-time Pro Bowl player, was raised in La Porte before leaving the racially segregated South to play at Michigan State University, where he was on two national championship teams in 1965 and 1966
- L. Neil Smith, an American libertarian science fiction author and political activist
- Terrel Bernard, an NFL Linebacker
- Jake Worthington, a country music artist

== See also ==
- Galveston Bay Area
