= Port of Texas City =

- Interactive map of Port of Texas City

Location
- Country: United States
- Location: Texas City, Texas
- Coordinates: 29.370872°N 94.896394°W
- UN/LOCODE: USTXT

Details
- Opened: 1893
- Operated by: Port of Texas City / Texas City Terminal Railway Company
- Owned by: Union Pacific Railroad, Burlington Northern Santa Fe Corporation
- Type of harbour: Natural/artificial

Statistics
- Annual cargo tonnage: 52,606,030 short tons (47,723,390 t)
- Value of cargo: US$10.8 billion
- Website https://www.tctrr.com/

The Port of Texas City is a major deepwater port in Texas City, Texas at Galveston Bay, United States. Its location on the bay, which is used by the Port of Houston and the Port of Galveston, puts Texas City in the heart of one of the world's most important shipping hubs. As of 2008 the Port of Texas City was the 14th leading port in the United States by total tons of trade and as of 2007 it was the 87th leading port in the world, according to the American Association of Port Authorities.

== History ==
The port opened in 1893, and began receiving ocean-going ships in 1904. Around 1914, a channel was dredged to increase access to the port. By 1918, the port had three slips and two piers. The port greatly expanded during World War II. Oil and chemical companies majorly expanded to meet wartime demand, driving increased ship traffic. In 1946, some 4,000 ships loaded or unloaded 13,444,000 short tons (12,196,000 t) of cargo.

== Traffic volume ==
In 2008, the total trade at the port was 52,606,030 short tons (47,723,390 t) making Texas City the third leading port in Texas and the 14th leading port in the United States. As of 2007 it was also the 87th leading port in the world. Of that 33,926,630 short tons (30,777,720 t) was foreign imports (7th in the U.S.), 4,783,805 short tons (4,339,795 t) was foreign exports (27th in the U.S.), and 13,895,595 short tons (12,605,872 t) was domestic trade (20th in the U.S.). In 2005, the total value of foreign trade shipped through the port was US$10.8 billion (22nd in the U.S.). Of that the value of foreign imports was US$9.22 billion (22nd in the U.S.) and the value of foreign exports was US$1.6 billion (25th in the U.S.).

== Texas City Disaster ==
In 1947, an explosion aboard the French-flagged S.S. Grandcamp, docked at Texas City, triggered fires and explosions throughout the port and the industrial complex. The resulting destruction is considered by many to be the worst industrial tragedy in the history of the United States. The fires caused more than five hundred deaths, more than four thousand injuries, and more than US$50 million in damage (US$704 million in today's dollars). In spite of the destruction the city was able to rebuild quickly and the port soon re-opened.

== See also ==
- Port of Galveston
- Port of Houston
- Texas City Terminal Railway
- List of ports in the United States
- Gulf Intracoastal Waterway
