= Bayport Terminal =

Bayport Container Terminal
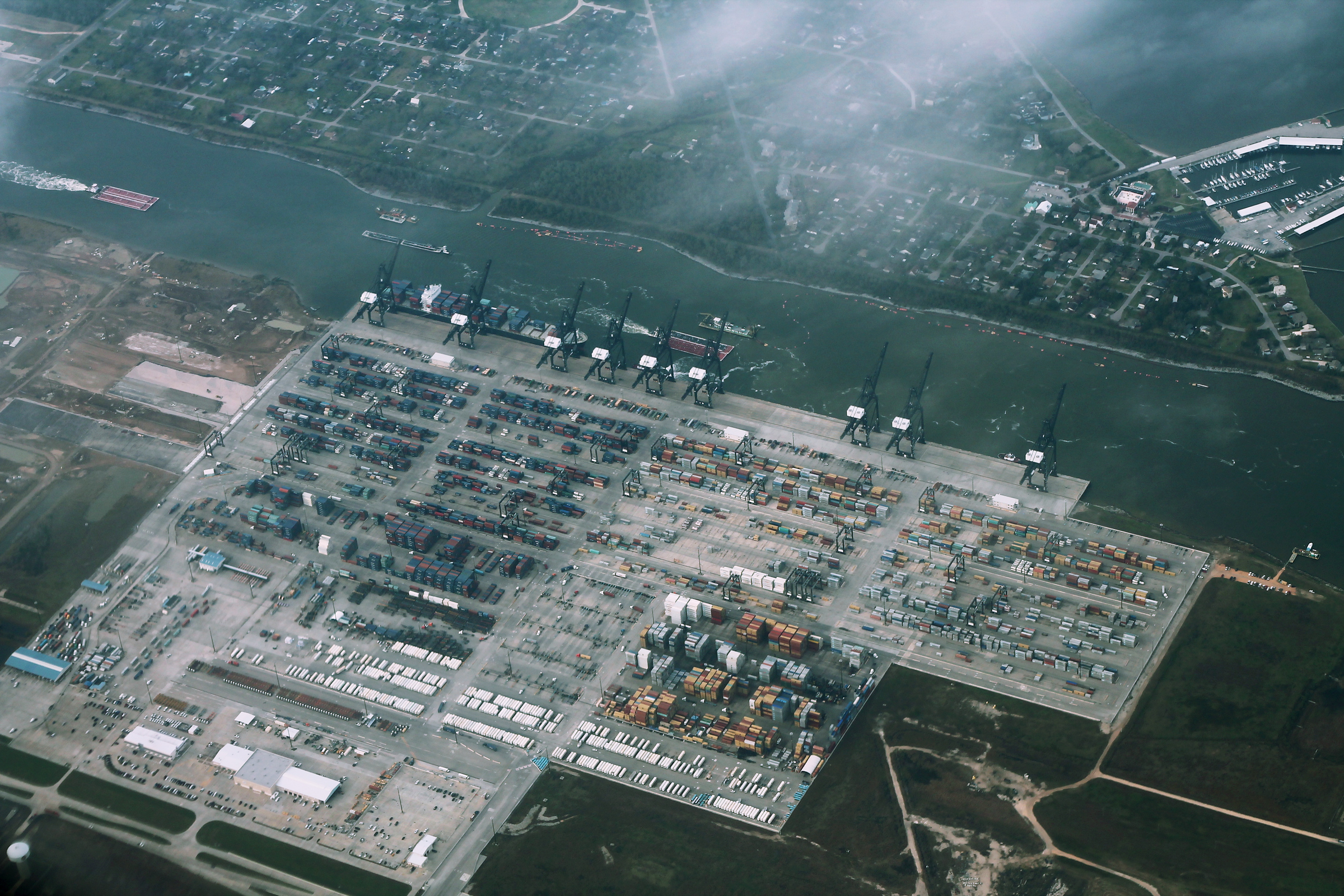
- Aerial view of the Bayport Container Terminal

Location
- Country: United States
- Location: Seabrook, Texas
- Coordinates: 29°36′40″N 95°0′40″W

Details
- Opened: 2007
- Operated by: Port of Houston Authority
- Owned by: City of Houston
- Type of harbour: Natural / artificial

Statistics
- Website http://www.portofhouston.com

The Bayport Container Terminal, or simply the Bayport Terminal, is a major deep water port in the Greater Houston area in Texas (United States). This relatively new terminal, part of the Port of Houston, is designed to handle standardized cargo containers and offload the nearby Barbours Cut Terminal, which has no further room for expansion. The Bayport Terminal is situated along the Bayport Ship Channel off Galveston Bay, between La Porte, Texas and Seabrook, Texas adjacent to Shoreacres. This channel itself feeds into the larger Houston Ship Channel, which runs from Houston, through Galveston Bay, to the Gulf of Mexico.

The port sits adjacent to the Bayport Industrial District, a large complex of firms primarily involved in petroleum and petrochemical processing.

The facilities at Bayport formerly included a cruise ship terminal, built at a cost of US$81 million. The terminal briefly saw use for cruises following Hurricane Ike when ships like Carnival Cruise Lines Ecstasy and Conquest were re-routed from the damaged Port of Galveston to Bayport for nearly two months. Bayport Cruise Terminal was a planned port of call for both Princess Cruises and Norwegian Cruise Line in 2013-2014. The cruise ships have since abandoned the terminal and the Port of Houston has dismantled the gangways.

== Controversy ==
The Bayport Terminal was controversial since before its construction due to concerns raised about environmental impact and the general suitability of the site. The United States Army Corps of Engineers approved the permit, but stated in the Environmental Impact Statement that unavoidable impacts of increased noise in the area, increased levels of nitrous oxides, sulfur dioxide, carbon dioxide, and cancer causing particulate matter would be emitted by the terminal. Homes are within 600 feet (180 m) of the docks. Due to the prevailing southeast wind and the proximity of the residents, the Corps of Engineers recommended a 30-foot (9.1 m) sound wall to block sound levels that they estimated to be as high as 70 dBA (as of 2010 the terminal was only approximately 30% in operation yet produced levels of 65 dBA). The Port of Houston approached residents who are affected by the pollution and noise and has attempted to buy an easement from these residents. In 2010, the mayor of Shoreacres published a letter to the community raising concerns about the scope of the easement and rights residents might be waiving by accepting it. That same year residents of Shoreacres filed suit against the Port of Houston Authority for damages.

== See also ==
- Barbours Cut Terminal
- Bayport Industrial District
- Port of Houston
- Port of Texas City
