= Bayport, Wisconsin =

Coordinates: 46°21′N 91°13′W

- Former Town
- Interactive map of Bayport, Wisconsin
- Country: United States
- State: Wisconsin
- County: La Pointe
- Established: March 1856

Area
  - Land: 3,751.4 sq mi (9,716.1 km^{2})

Bayport was a town in La Pointe County in the U.S. state of Wisconsin.

When La Pointe County was established in 1845, it consisted of all of present-day Bayfield, Ashland, and Douglas counties. The county also consisted of only one town: the Town of La Pointe. This situation continued until March 1856, when the town of Bayport was created. Bayport consisted of all of La Pointe County except for the Apostle Islands, which remained the Town of La Pointe.

The town eventually faded from existence when people migrated out of the town; administration of the area fell back to the Town of La Pointe. The Town of Ashland, Bayfield, and Town of Superior, was created out of the territory in 1867. By that time, the county of La Pointe had ceased to exist, instead being divided into Ashland, Douglas, and Bayfield counties.
