= Port of Galveston =

Port of the city of Galveston, Texas, United States

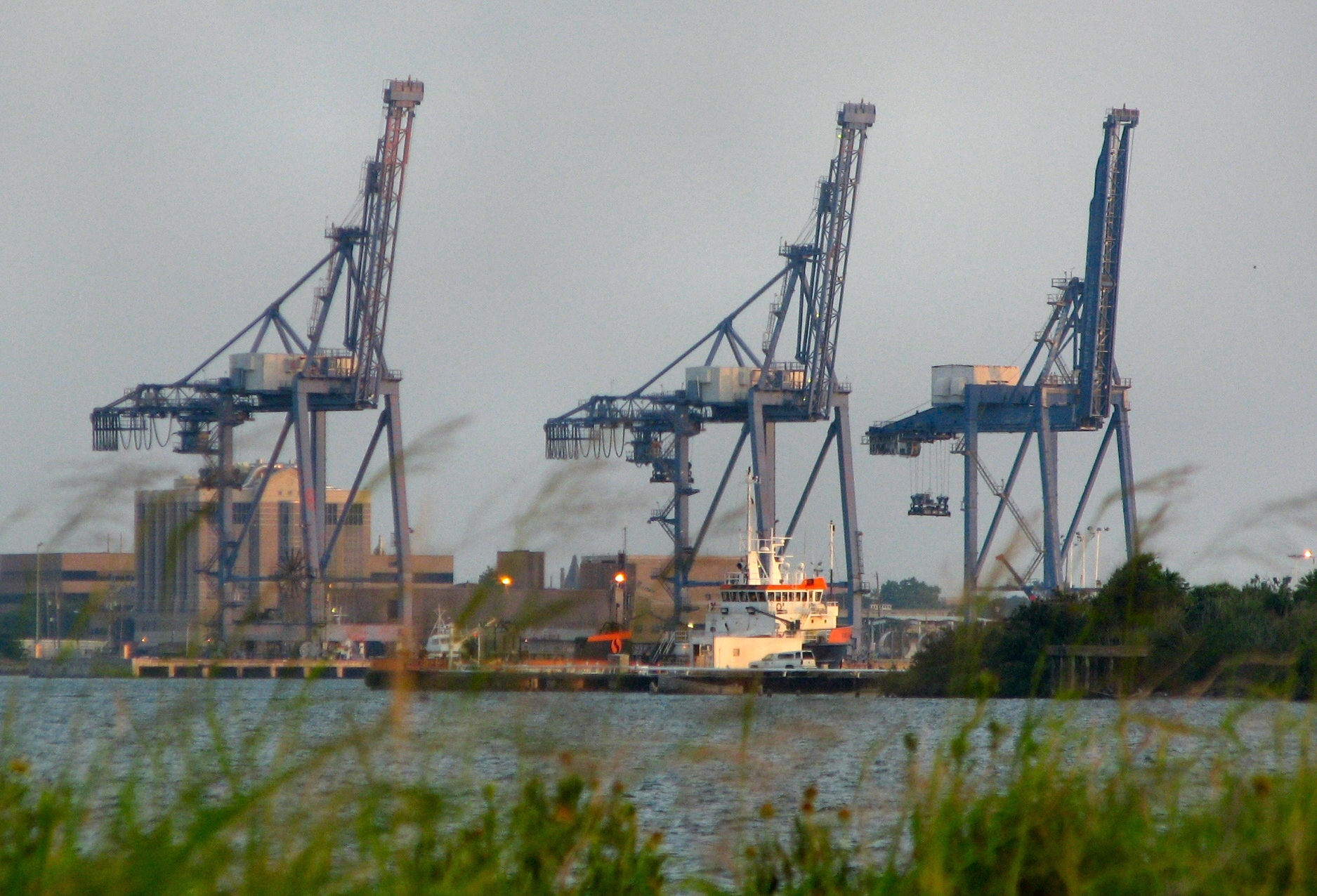
- Cranes at the Port of Galveston container terminal
- Interactive map of Port of Galveston

Location
- Country: United States
- Location: Galveston, Texas
- Coordinates: 29.305°N 94.810°W
- UN/LOCODE: USGLS

Details
- Opened: 1825
- Operated by: Galveston Wharves Board of Trustees
- Owned by: City of Galveston
- Type of Harbor: Natural
- No. of piers: 22
- Employees: 121
- Port director: Rodger Rees

Statistics
- Vessel arrivals: 840 (2018)
- Annual cargo tonnage: 4,104,867 short tons (3,723,873 t) (2018)
- Annual container volume: 83,643 (2009)
- Value of cargo: $680.359 million (2005) $2,697
- Passenger traffic: 1,966,178 (2018)
- Annual revenue: $43.5 million (2018)
- Net income: $7 million (2018)
- Minimum depth: 45 feet (14 m)
- Narrowest width: 1,200 feet (370 m)
- Website www.portofgalveston.com

The Port of Galveston is the port of the city of Galveston, Texas, United States. It was established by a proclamation issued by the Congress of Mexico on October 17, 1825, while the land known today as Texas was still part of Mexico. The Port of Galveston is the oldest port in the Gulf of Mexico west of New Orleans.

== Overview ==
Located on the upper Texas Gulf Coast on the eastern end of Galveston Island, it is 9.3 miles (15.0 km) from the open Gulf or approximately 30 minutes sailing time. The port is municipally owned by the City of Galveston and is managed by the board of trustees of the Galveston Wharves. The port is self-sustaining, and does not receive any taxpayer funding. The Port of Galveston consists of the Galveston Ship Channel, the south side of Pelican Island, the north side of Galveston Island, and the entrance to Galveston Bay. The Galveston Channel has an authorized minimum depth of 45 feet (14 m) and is 1,200 feet (370 m) wide at its narrowest point.

The port has 15–20 lines of business.

In 2015, the eastern section of the port, ending at Pier 38, was dredged to a depth of 13.716 metres (45.00 ft). Siltation occurred at a faster than expected pace, requiring more dredging in 2016. The western part of the port will be dredged from a depth of 12.1 metres (40 ft) to 13.7 metres (45 ft), at a cost of $12–15 million. To accommodate cruise ships, the area where the ships turn around is routinely dredged every four years.

== History ==
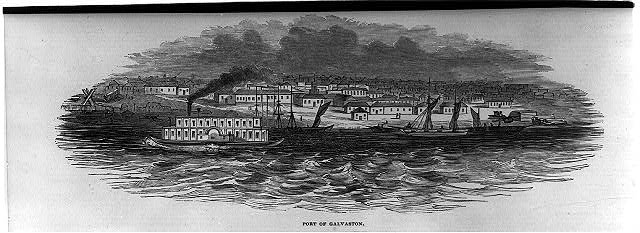
Port of Galveston ca. 1845

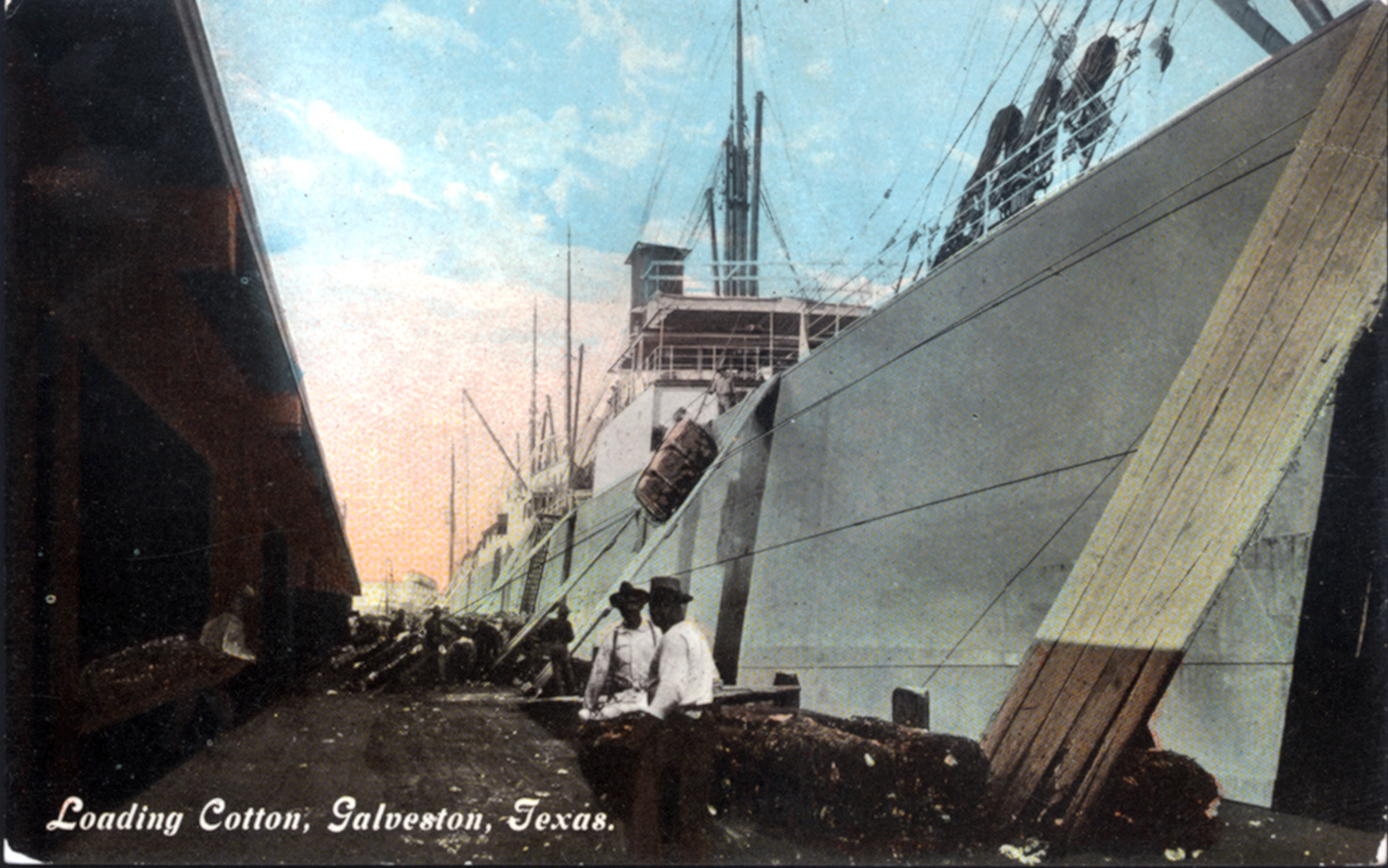
Loading cotton at Galveston Wharfs & Harbor

During the late 19th century, the port was the busiest on the Gulf Coast and considered to be second busiest in the country, next to the Port of New York and New Jersey. In the 1850s, the port of Galveston exported approximately goods valued almost 20 times what was imported. The main export was cotton. The Galveston Wharf Company took control of the port in 1869. They built a grain elevator in 1875, leading Galveston to become a major grain exporter over the next few decades. By 1878, the port of Galveston was the nation's 3rd largest cotton exporter; they fell to 5th by 1882. Galveston's wealth and great esteem was due in large part to the port's activity. As other areas of the United States began to transition to a more industrial economy, Galveston was unable to compete. The port continued to primarily export agricultural goods. Local leaders often blamed the lack of industrial goods to export on the city's lack of an adequate water supply. However, when the city water project finished in the early 1890s, industrialization still did not occur. In reality, many companies were hesitant to invest in machinery on an island prone to floods. The nearby city of Houston was able to better attract industry and began positioning themselves as a viable alternative to Galveston.

The port survived the Galveston Hurricane of 1900 relatively unscathed, but the railroad connecting the island to the mainland suffered significant damage. In response to the hurricane, city leaders dredged the ship channel to raise the island's grade. As a result, the port was now considered a deep-water port and was able to handle larger ships. By the time World War I began, Galveston "was the leading cotton port in the world, the third-largest exporter of wheat, and an important sugar import center." The port also became a major immigration center, with almost 50,000 people entering the country between 1906 and 1914.

In March 1920 local longshoreman called for a strike, seeking a wage increase and recognition of their union, the International Longshoreman's Association. Some of the port traffic was diverted to the Port of Port Arthur. Some businesses threatened to pull out of Galveston completely if the port wasn't reopened. Governor William P. Hobby declared martial law and sent the Texas National Guard to take control of the city and the port. The city was under martial law until January 1921, when the longshoreman agreed to return to work for a salary increase that was less than they had sought.

Later that decade, the port of Galveston became a major sulphur exporter. As the oil industry expanded in Texas, no pipelines were built to Galveston.

The Intracoastal Canal opened in 1933.

For several years in the 1990s, port officials attempted to lure modern cruise ships to Galveston. Their efforts paid off in 2000. On September 30, the Carnival Cruise Lines ship Celebration debarked from the port of Galveston. The 722 feet (220 m) long Celebration, and other ships based in Galveston in the first few years, were small and older. Over the next 16 years, the port invested more than $85 million to build and improve facilities to accommodate these ships. Princess declined to sail from Galveston after the 2007 season.

Hurricane Ike hit the Texas Gulf Coast in 2008, causing major damage to the port. The cruise terminals were closed for several months, forcing Carnival to use the Bayport Cruise Terminal temporarily.

At Carnival's behest, the port embarked on major improvements to Terminal 1 in 2010. The terminal was expanded to provide more seating, restrooms, and security screening stations. In 2011, Carnival added a second year-round ship in Galveston, the Carnival Triumph, increasing their capacity by 40%. The following year, Carnival transferred the Carnival Magic, to Galveston, marking the first time that a cruise line had based its newest ship at this port. Both Princess Cruises and Disney Cruise Line stationed ships in Galveston for the winter season in 2012–2013. From 2014 to 2015, the cruise business expanded substantially, adding an additional 400,000 passengers.

To lure larger ships, carrying up to 5,000 passengers, the port renovated and expanded Terminal 2. A new building was constructed on the foundations of an 80-year-old silo and then connected to the original Terminal 2. The port's contract with Royal Caribbean International specified that the work would be completed before the Liberty of the Seas was repositioned to Galveston. Both Royal Caribbean and Carnival expressed public displeasure when the project was delayed multiple times. One delay was due to a redesign required when engineers discovered the work area had sandier soil than expected and would thus require a more sturdy foundation. The construction area was thought to be the location of a sunk Texas Navy warship, requiring archaeological analysis before construction could begin.

In 2021, the Port announced that a third cruise terminal would be built and Terminal 3 would exclusively serve Royal Caribbean's Oasis-class Allure of the Seas starting in November 2022, which at the time of announcement was the third-largest cruise ship in the world.

Later also the passenger port of Galveston is prepared to welcome the arrival of Norwegian Prima (cruise ship from Norwegian Cruise Line), because Norwegian Prima will begin sail in Atlantic Caribbean route begin October 2022 departing from Galveston.

== Cargo ==
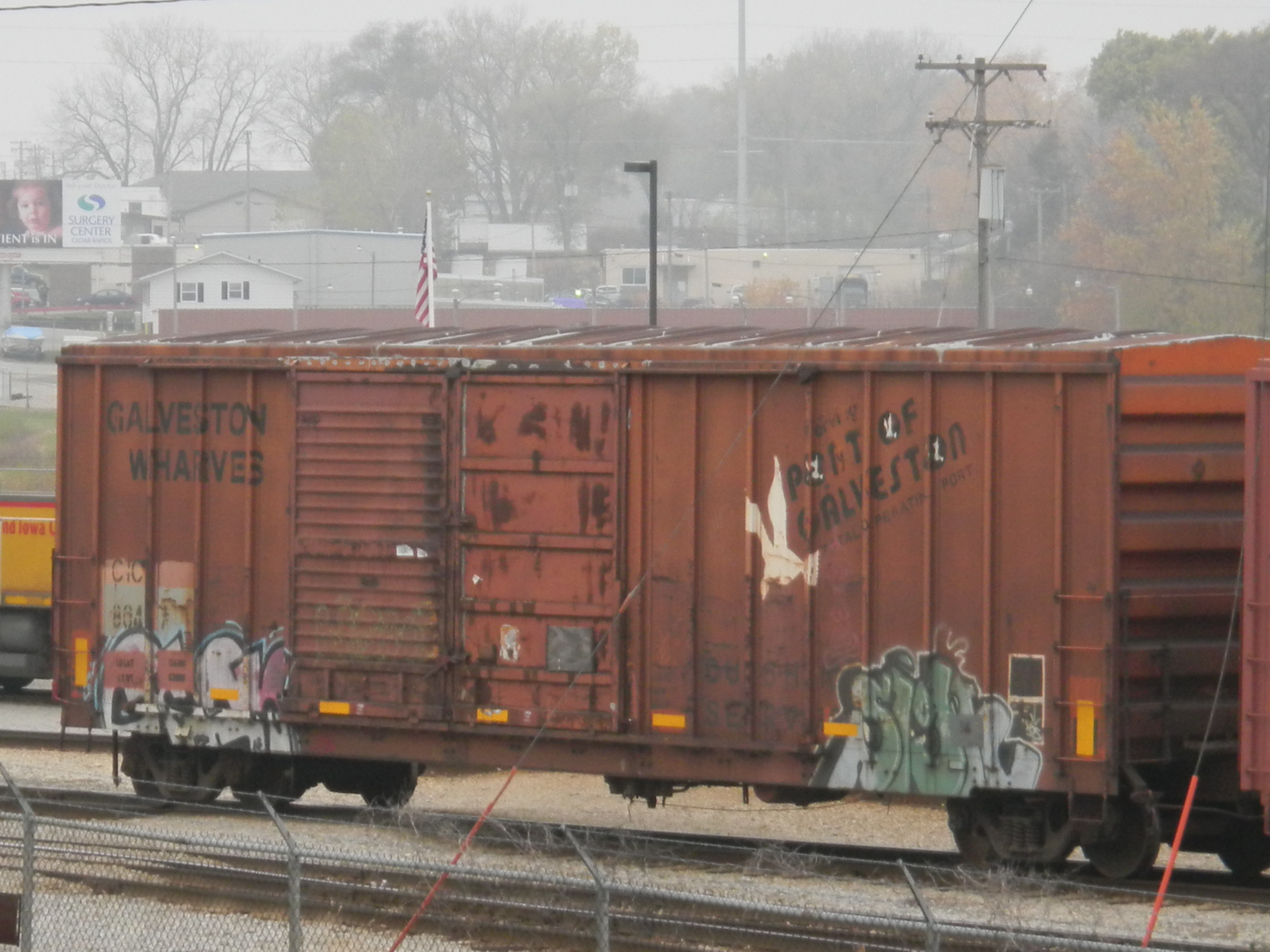
Galveston Wharves boxcar with CRANDIC markings on the CRANDIC at Cedar Rapids, Iowa.

The port is equipped to handle all types of cargo including containers, dry and liquid bulk, breakbulk, RO/RO, refrigerated, and project cargoes. The Galveston Railroad, a terminal switching railroad, facilitates movement of cargo by rail.

Del Monte uses one wharf to import bananas. In April 2016, a new vehicle distribution center for BMW was opened at the port. This was the result of a public-private partnership that the port entered into with Wallenius Wilhelmsen Logistics Vehicle Services Americas. The new 20 acres (8.1 ha) site has the capacity to import 32,500 cars per year, an inventory worth more than $1.3 billion.

== Passengers ==
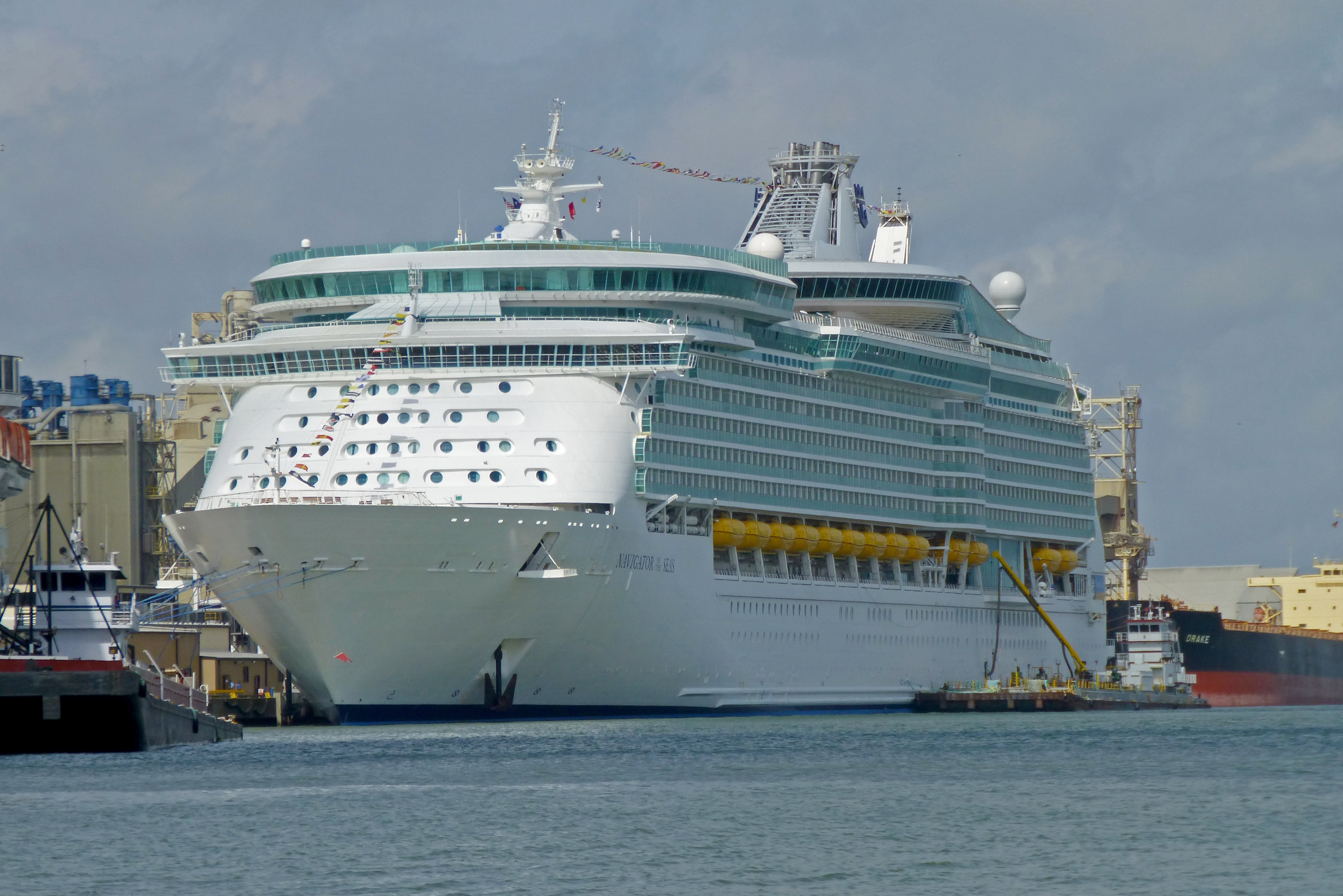
The cruise industry has become a major source of operating revenue for the Port of Galveston

As of 2019, Galveston is the fourth-busiest cruise ship homeport in North America and one of the top 10 homeports in the world. Over the years, the port has welcomed ships from major cruise lines including Carnival Cruise Lines, Royal Caribbean International, Princess Cruises, Disney Cruise Line and Norwegian Cruise Lines. In 2019, three Carnival ships and two Royal Caribbean ships call the port home year-round, while Disney operates one ship for limited sailings. An estimated 1.1 million cruise passengers sailed from the port in 2019, a fourteen percent increase over 2018. A 2019 economic analysis estimated that cruise passengers and crew visits produced and estimated $125 million into the local Galveston economy, an average of $988 per passenger.

There are two dedicated cruise terminals. Unlike many other ports, the cruise terminals are not used for other activities, such as conferences or corporate events. Terminal 1 was expanded and improved in 2010, as a condition of Carnival Cruise Line placing their then-newest ship, the Carnival Magic at the port. Terminal 2 was expanded in 2016 to accommodate Royal Caribbean's desire to base their larger Freedom-class ships in Galveston. The new 150,000 square feet (14,000 m^{2}) facility can accommodate up to 5,000 passengers and allows for simultaneous handling of passengers embarking and disembarking. A third terminal, on Pier 10, will be built at the cost of approximately $100,000,000 for Royal Caribbean's Oasis-class ships and will be the home of the Allure of the Seas starting in November 2022.

The port receives fees of $11–26 per cruise ship passenger, depending on whether port employees are responsible for tying the ship down, or for paying the harbor pilots responsible for bringing the ships into the port. Cruises account for approximately 60% of the port's revenues.

Unlike other cruise ports in the United States, the port of Galveston can be affected by fog, particularly in late December, January, and February. This can delay the ships' return to port. Beginning in 2014, the Texas Alcoholic Beverage Commission began collecting taxes from returning cruise passengers on any alcohol and cigarettes they had purchased onboard or in foreign ports.

== Other revenue streams ==
Much of the port's profit comes from parking fees. Approximately two-thirds of Galveston cruise passengers drive to the port. The port operates a large parking lot for cruise passengers to leave their cars. It also charges an access fee for private operators to enter the cruise terminal area to pick up or drop off passengers. Several parking operators sued the port over these fees. In January 2017, the United States Federal Maritime Commission unanimously upheld the port's right to charge them.

In February 2016, the port completed construction on the Galveston Downtown Transit Terminal. Designed to "connect the port to the city itself", the facility contains a shopping center and parking.

== General sources ==
- "Statistics". Port of Galveston, TX – Official Website.
