= Fred Hartman Bridge =

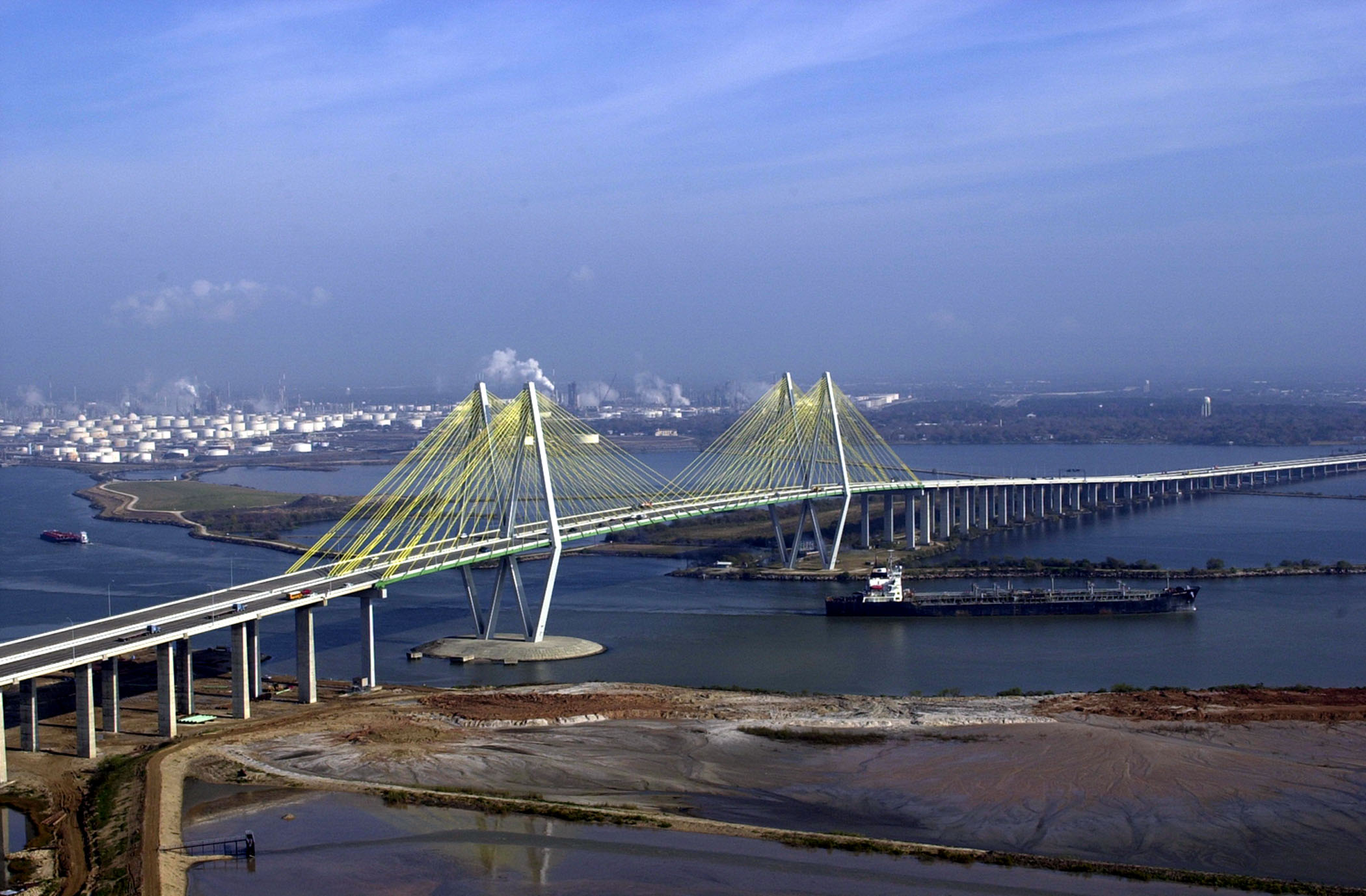
- The bridge in 2000
- Coordinates: 29.70347°N 95.01742°W
- Carries: 8 lanes of SH 146
- Crosses: Houston Ship Channel
- Locale: Harris County, south of Baytown, Texas and north of La Porte, Texas
- Official name: Fred Hartman Bridge
- Maintained by: Texas Department of Transportation

Characteristics
- Design: fan arranged cable-stayed bridge
- Material: Cables: polymer-wrapped twisted steel wire bundles pylons: reinforced concrete main deck: reinforced concrete approach deck: precast prestressed concrete
- Total length: 4.185 kilometers (2.60 mi)
- Width: 47 meters (154 ft)
- Height: 133 meters (436 ft) (pylon)
- Longest span: 381 meters (1,250 feet)
- Clearance above: 80.6 meters (262 feet)
- Clearance below: 54.8 meters (178 feet)

History
- Construction start: 1986
- Construction end: 1995
- Opened: September 27, 1995; 31 years ago

Statistics
- Toll: none

Location
- Interactive map of Fred Hartman Bridge

The Fred Hartman Bridge is a cable-stayed bridge in the U.S. state of Texas spanning the Houston Ship Channel. The bridge carries 2.6 miles (4.2 km) of State Highway 146 (SH 146), between the cities of Baytown and La Porte (east of Houston). The bridge is also expected to carry SH 99 (Grand Parkway) when it is completed around Houston.

The bridge, named for Fred Hartman (1908–1991), the editor and publisher of the Baytown Sun from 1950 to 1974, is the longest cable-stayed bridge in Texas and one of only four such bridges in the state, the others being Veterans Memorial Bridge in Orange County, Margaret Hunt Hill Bridge in Dallas, and Bluff Dale Suspension Bridge in Erath County. It is the 77th-largest bridge in the world. The construction cost of the bridge was $91.25 million (equivalent to $171 million in 2024).

The bridge replaced the Baytown Tunnel (of depth clearance 40 feet or 12 meters). The tunnel had to be removed when the Houston Ship Channel was deepened to 45 feet (13.7 m), with a minimum 530 feet (161.5 m) bottom width, to accommodate larger ships. The last section of the Baytown Tunnel was removed from the Houston Ship Channel on September 14, 1999, with removal of the tunnel being the responsibility of the Texas Department of Transportation (TxDOT).

== Construction ==
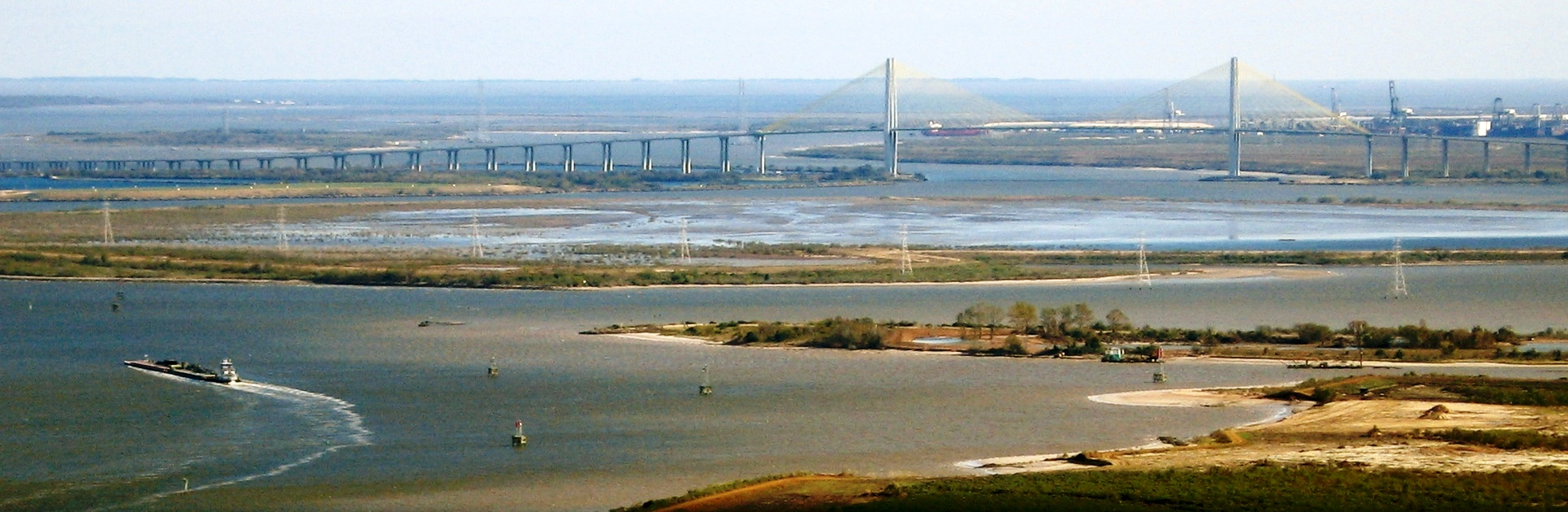
Fred Hartman Bridge

In October 1985, the Texas Highway Department announced the project and estimated it would take two years to complete. The bridge was designed by Greiner Engineering, Inc., which was acquired by URS Corporation in 1995, which in turn was acquired by AECOM in October 2014. Construction began in 1987 and was contracted by Williams Brothers and Traylor Brothers construction companies. In 1993, The firm selected to produce the steel, a Mexican company, went bankrupt. The contract was then awarded to a South African company, which caused complaints because of the country's apartheid policies. After the completion date was pushed back several times, a letter was sent to the TxDOT's executive director, William Burnett, from the city of Baytown via the Baytown Sun in early 1995, which helped spur interest in finishing the project. Finally, on September 27, 1995, the Fred Hartman Bridge had its grand opening ceremony, which was hosted by Baytown and La Porte chambers of commerce. Notable guests include George W. Bush, Miss Texas 1995, William Burnett, and the Hartman family. Fred Hartman died in 1991 and did not live to see his dream come to fruition.
