= Houston Ship Channel =

Canal in Texas

Coordinates: 29°42′30″N 95°00′18″W

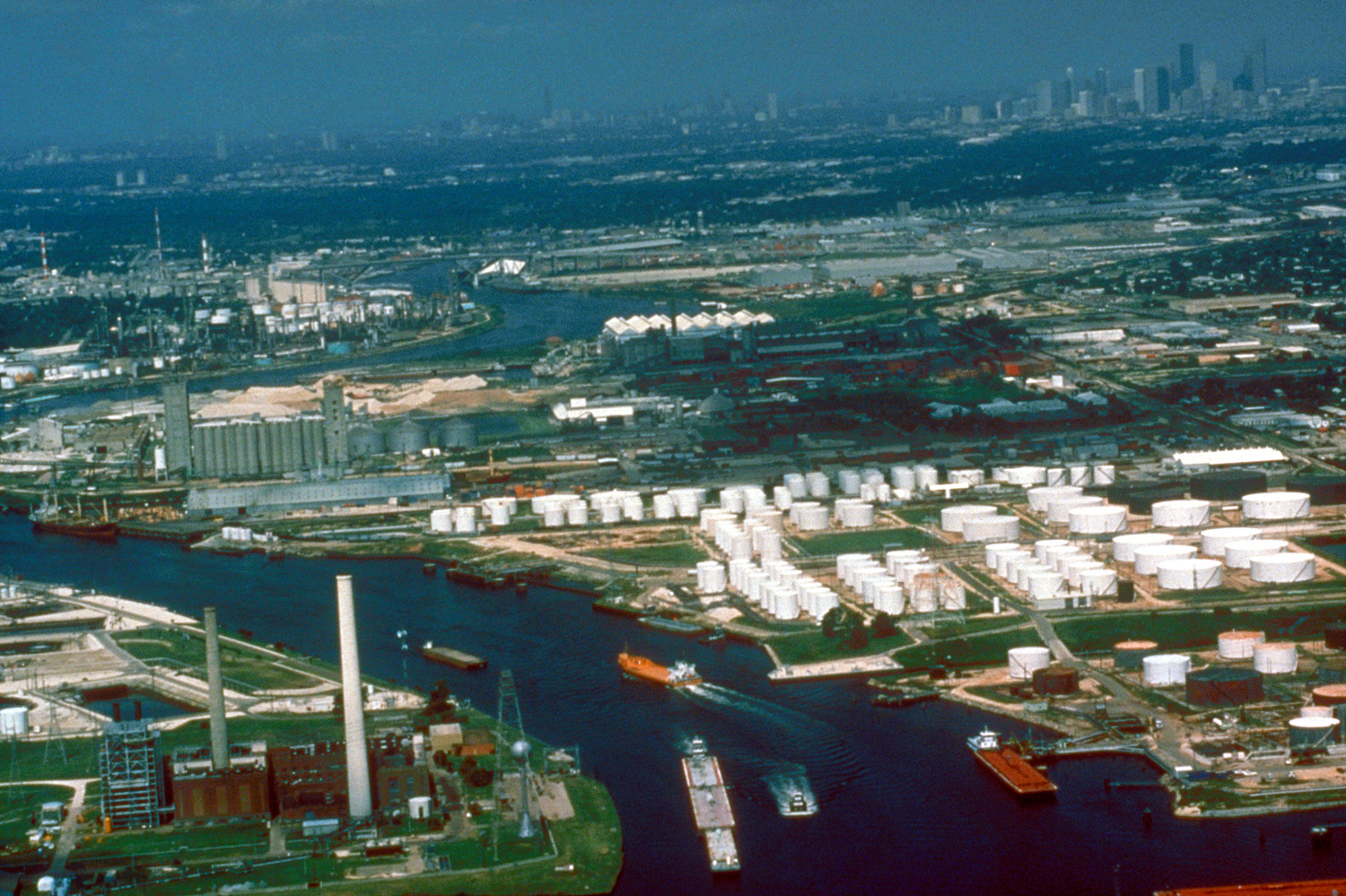
- Part of the Buffalo Bayou portion of the Houston Ship Channel in 1999
- Interactive map of Houston Ship Channel
- Country: United States

Specifications
- Length: 50 miles (80 km)

Geography
- Start point: Port of Houston
- End point: Gulf of Mexico

The Houston Ship Channel, in Houston, Texas, is part of the Port of Houston, one of the busiest seaports in the world. The channel is the conduit for ocean-going vessels between Houston-area terminals and the Gulf of Mexico, and it serves an increasing volume of inland barge traffic.

== Overview ==
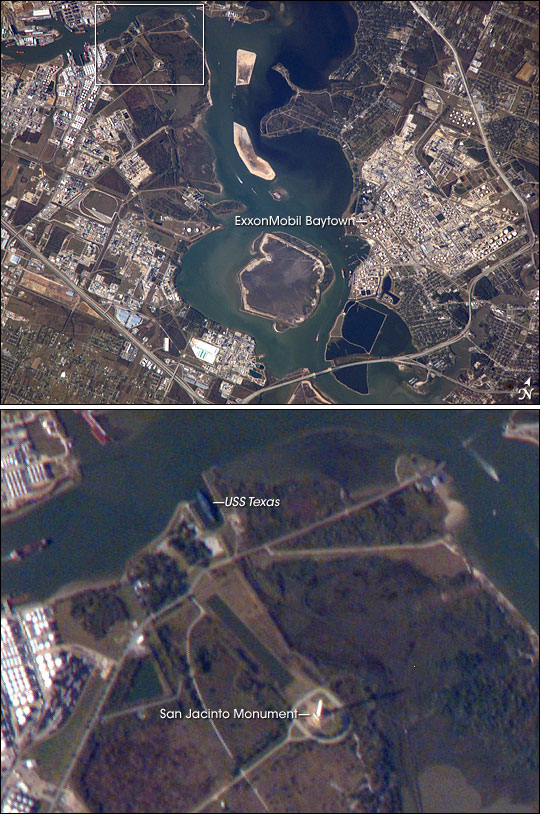
San Jacinto River in Channel - inset (white line top left) magnified as bottom photo showing the Texas and San Jacinto Monument

The channel is a widened and deepened natural watercourse created by dredging Buffalo Bayou and Galveston Bay. The channel's upstream terminus lies about four miles east of downtown Houston, at the Turning Basin, with its downstream terminus at a gateway to the Gulf of Mexico, between Galveston Island and the Bolivar Peninsula. Major products, such as petrochemicals and Midwestern grain, are transported in bulk together with general cargo. The original watercourse for the channel, Buffalo Bayou, has its headwaters 30 miles (48 km) to the west of the city of Houston. The navigational head of the channel, the most upstream point to which general cargo ships can travel, is at Turning Basin in east Houston.

The channel has numerous terminals and berthing locations along Buffalo Bayou and Galveston Bay. The major public terminals include Turning Basin, Barbours Cut, and Bayport. Many private docks are there as well, including the ExxonMobil Baytown Complex and the Deer Park Complex.

The channel, occasionally widened and deepened to accommodate ever-larger ships, is 530 feet (160 m) wide by 45 feet (14 m) deep by 50 miles (80 km) long. The islands in the ship channel are part of the ongoing widening and deepening project. The islands are formed from soil pulled up by dredging, and the salt marshes and bird islands are part of the Houston Port Authority's beneficial use and environmental mitigation responsibilities.

== History ==
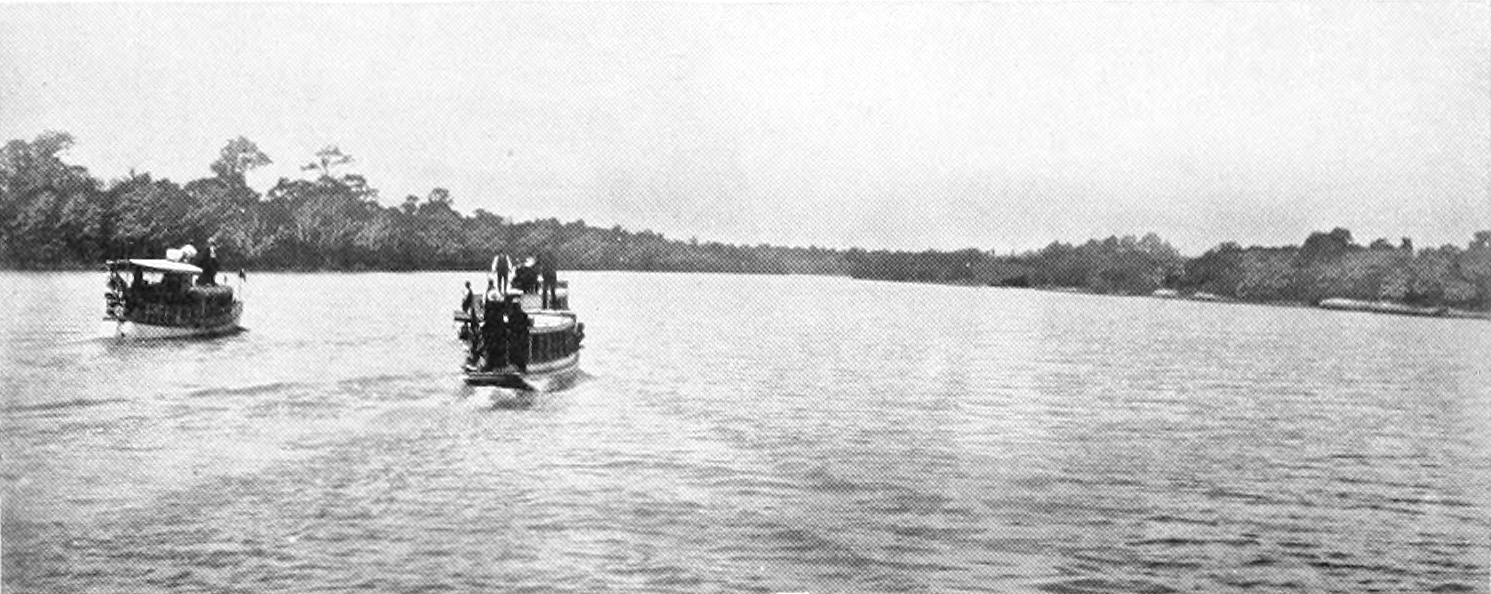
Photo of the Houston Ship Channel in 1913

John Richardson Harris platted the town of Harrisburg, Texas on Buffalo Bayou at the mouth of Brays Bayou in 1826. He established a steam mill there, while making Harrisburg into a logistical center for the Austin's Colony. He plied his schooner The Rights of Man through the waters of Galveston Bay and Buffalo Bayou, importing supplies from the United States, and exporting cotton and hides. However, fewer people settled Buffalo Bayou than the fertile Brazos Valley, so Harrisburg remained a remote overland location from the critical mass of farmlands: about 20 miles from Fort Bend, Texas and about 40 miles from San Felipe de Austin, Texas. Travelling the Brazos River presented several hazards, most of all, its shifting, shallow sandbars at its mouth. Despite several interventions, the river remained hostile to navigation. Nicholas Clopper acquired land downstream from Harrisburg, the eponymously named Clopper's Point. He recruited six men from Ohio to work as traders, who sailed the schooner Little Zoe from Cincinnati laden with supplies such as flour and spices, nails and other hardware, and whiskey and tobacco. Two of these hires were his sons, Edward and Joseph Clopper. They recorded their travels in a journal, reporting several hazards of Galveston Bay in route to Buffalo Bayou. They ran Little Zoe aground on Galveston Island and later observed two wrecked ships in the bay. They encountered the shallow Red Fish Bar, which they passed while dragging over it.

The channel has been used to move goods to the sea since at least 1836. Buffalo Bayou and Galveston Bay were dredged during the late 19th and early 20th centuries to accommodate larger ships. In the wake of the 1900 Galveston hurricane, the inland Port of Houston was seen as a safer long-term option, and planning for a larger ship channel began. By the mid 1900s the Port of Houston had established itself as the leading port in Texas, eclipsing the natural harbors at Galveston and Texas City. The Turning Basin terminal in Harrisburg (now part of Houston) became the port's largest shipping point.

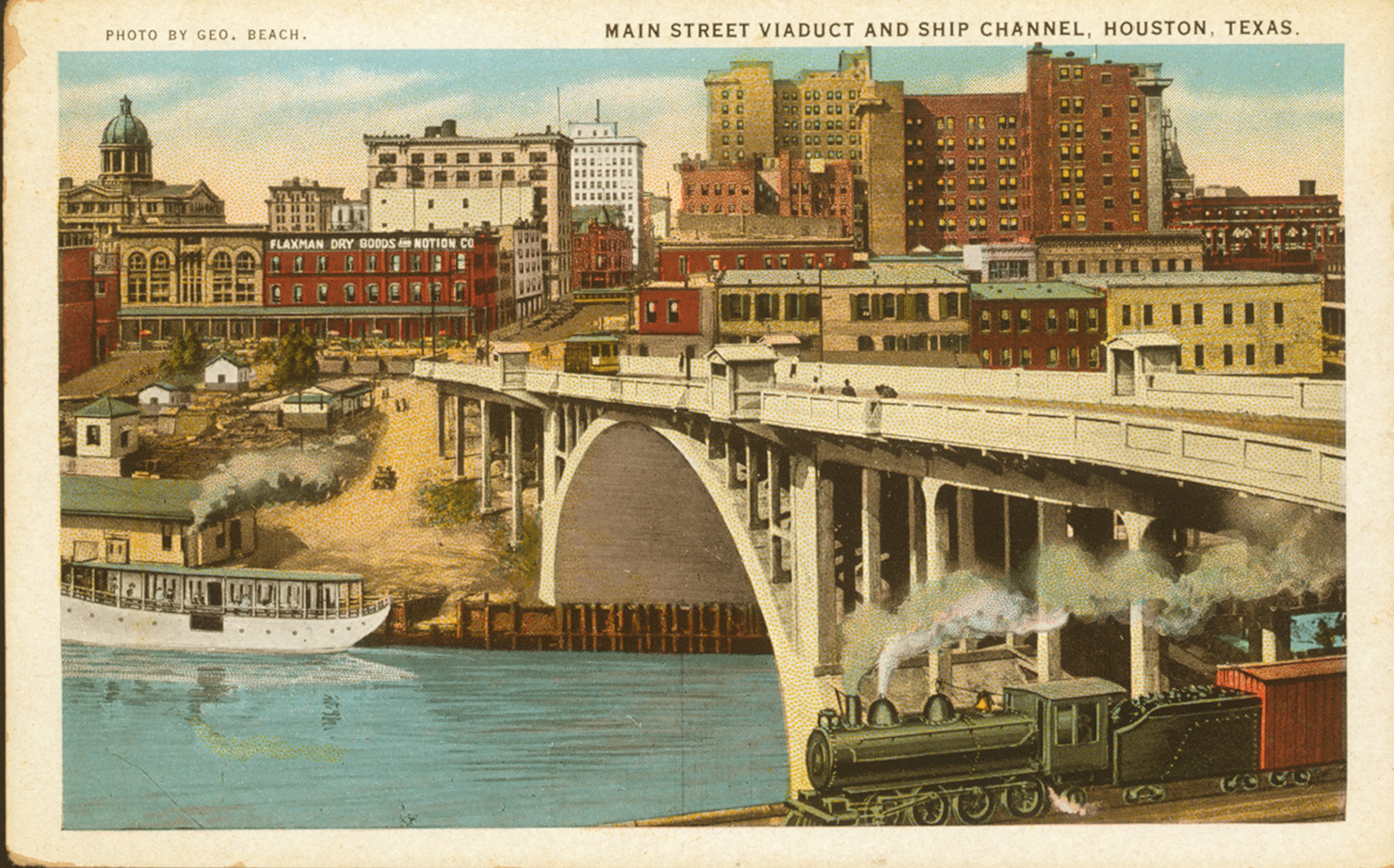
Postcard of the Houston Ship Channel, undated

On January 10, 1910, residents of Harris County voted 16 to 1 to fund dredging the Houston ship channel to a depth of 25 feet for the amount of $1,250,000, which was then matched by federal funds. On June 14, 1914 the first deepwater ship, steamship Satilla, arrived at the port of Houston, establishing steamboat service between New York City and Houston. On November 10, 1914, President Woodrow Wilson opened the Houston Ship Channel, part of the Port of Houston. The onset of World War I and the first mechanized war's thirst for oil greatly increased use of the ship channel.

The United States Army Corps of Engineers increased the depth of the channel from 25 to 30 feet in 1922.

In 1933, the United States Department of War and the United States House Committee on Rivers and Harbors approved a plan to increase the depth of the channel from 30 to 34 feet and widen the Galveston Bay section from 250 to 400 feet. The Public Works Administration provided $2,800,000 for the project, which was completed in late 1935.

The proximity to Texas oilfields led to the establishment of numerous petrochemical refineries along the waterway, such as the ExxonMobil Baytown installation on the eastern bank of the San Jacinto River. Now the channel and surrounding area support the second-largest petrochemical complex in the world.

While much of the Houston Ship Channel is associated with heavy industry, an icon of Texas history is also located along its length. The San Jacinto Monument commemorates the Battle of San Jacinto (1836) in which Texas won its independence from Mexico. From 1948 to 2022, also along the channel's path was the museum ship USS Texas (BB-35). She saw service during both world wars, and is the oldest remaining example of a dreadnought-era battleship in existence. In 2022, the USS Texas was permanently relocated from her berth along the channel.

The US Army's San Jacinto Ordnance Depot was located on the channel from 1941–1964.

During World War II, two large shipyards produced side-by-side at the confluence of Greens Bayou: Todd Houston Shipbuilding built mostly Liberty Ships and Brown Shipbuilding built a substantial number of destroyer escorts, submarine chasers and amphibious landing craft.

Currently, the channel is dredged to a depth of 43–45 feet. The channel was designated a National Civil Engineering Landmark by the American Society of Civil Engineers (ASCE) in 1987.

The "Texas chicken" maneuver is known to mariners who regularly navigate large vessels on the Houston Ship Channel.

In 2022, Port Houston began its channel expansion project, Project 11, in 2022. This project involves expanding the length of the channel from 530 feet to 700 feet, as well as deepening some segments to 46.5 feet deep. Other goals this project focuses on are: safety improvements, better environmental features, and increased economical benefits.

== Pollution ==
On December 25, 2007, the Houston Ship Channel was featured on the CNN Special, Planet in Peril, as a potential polluter of nearby neighborhoods. That year, the University of Texas released a study suggesting that children living within 2 miles (3.2 km) of the Houston Ship Channel were 56% more likely to become sick with leukemia than the national average.

On March 22, 2014, a barge carrying nearly a million gallons of marine fuel oil collided with another ship in the Houston Ship Channel, causing the contents of one of the barge's 168,000-gallon tanks to leak into Galveston Bay.

On January 26, 2024, a report published by Amnesty International stated that more than 103,000 people live within 3 miles of those facilities, which were found to have violated air pollution regulations a total of 2,315 times during the last 20 years and 167 times since 2020.

On March 5, 2025, an article Published by Public Health Watch stated that the Texas Department of State Health services found greater than expected rates of leukemia, cervix, lung, and bronchus cancer on Harris County's industrial east side.

On December 25, 2007, the Houston Ship Channel was featured on the CNN Special, Planet in Peril, as a potential polluter of nearby neighborhoods. That year, the University of Texas released a study suggesting that children living within 2 miles (3.2 km) of the Houston Ship Channel were 56% more likely to become sick with leukemia than the national average.[19] An article from 2023 says that the leukemia within the eastern Houston area, including the Houston Ship Channel is linked to benzene. This chemical is released into the air and research has shown that through inhalation can cause leukemia as well as other blood cancers (The Business Insider 2023)

On March 22, 2014, a barge carrying nearly a million gallons of marine fuel oil collided with another ship in the Houston Ship Channel, causing the contents of one of the barge's 168,000-gallon tanks to leak into Galveston Bay.[20]

On January 26, 2024, a report published by Amnesty International stated that more than 103,000 people live within 3 miles of those facilities, which were found to have violated air pollution regulations a total of 2,315 times during the last 20 years and 167 times since 2020.[21] A 2025 article written by Kendall Capshaw and Jamie Padgett said that during tropical storms and hurricanes there are spikes within the emissions from these petrochemical refineries due to a halt in production. This leads to a dangerous increase in air pollutants in the Ship Channel and surrounding areas. Additionally, the article goes on to talk about how this pollution is going to continue as data shows all refineries in the area are going to experience these shutdowns. (Capshaw & Padgett)

On March 5, 2025, an article Published by Public Health Watch stated that the Texas Department of State Health services found greater than expected rates of leukemia, cervix, lung, and bronchus cancer on Harris County's industrial east side.[22]

== Affected Areas ==
In a report from Texas Southern University, surrounding cities are heavily affected by the pollution of the Houston Ship Channel. They discuss a town called Pleasantville that is fighting against the widening of the ship canal, claiming it will worsen their situation. This town has previously been affected by various chemicals and pollutants that are released and dumped into the Houston Ship Channel. However, even with protesting, the City of Houston rules in favor of the local business causing the pollution. Furthermore, the report explains that if these residents were ever exposed to a chemical spillage, they would be unable to evacuate or receive medical help.

== Crossings ==
Crossing	Carries	Notes
Fred Hartman Bridge	SH 146	Connecting La Porte and Baytown
Lynchburg Ferry	automobiles and pedestrians	
Sam Houston Ship Channel Bridge	Sam Houston Tollway	Popularly known as the Beltway 8 Bridge, or the Two Dollar Bridge
Washburn Tunnel	Federal Road	
Sidney Sherman Bridge	I-610	

== Gallery ==
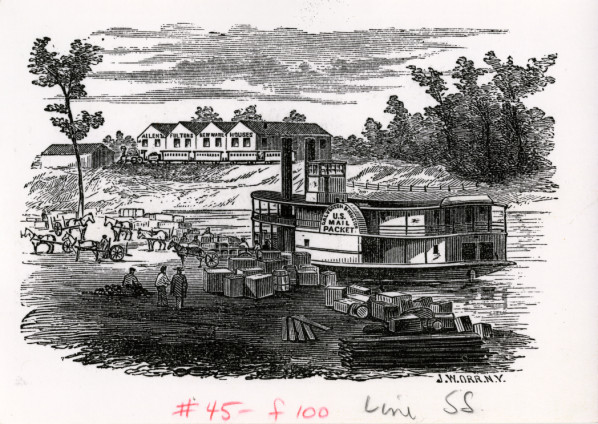
Drawing of ship at port 1859

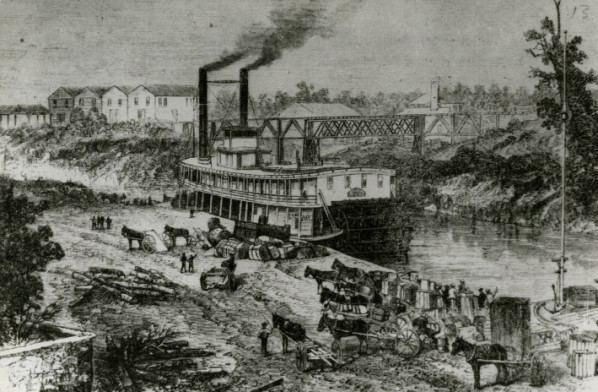
Drawing of ship at port 1859

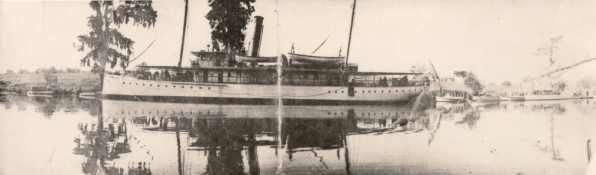
The Houston Ship Channel during its first opening in 1915

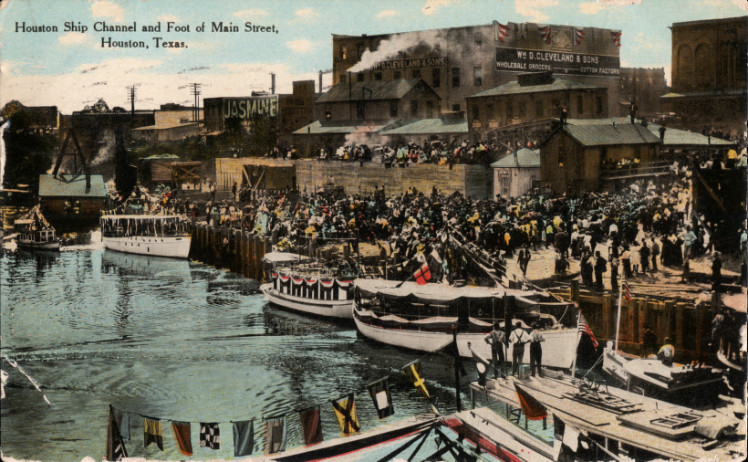
Houston Ship Channel and foot of Main Street, Houston, Texas (postcard, circa 1910)

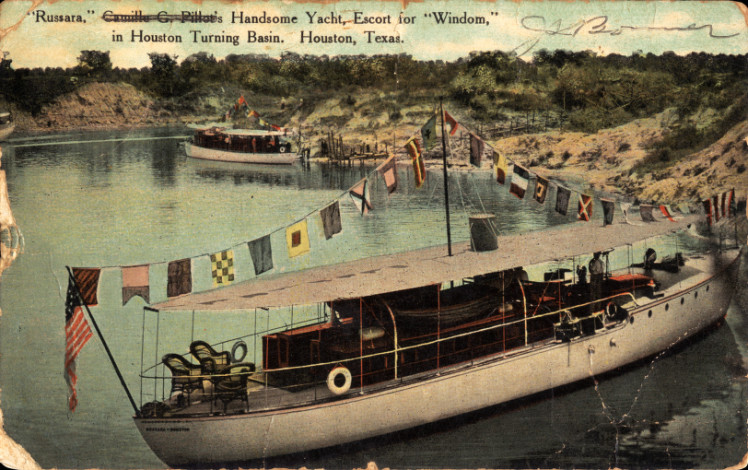
Yachts in the Houston Turning Basin, Houston (postcard, circa 1911)

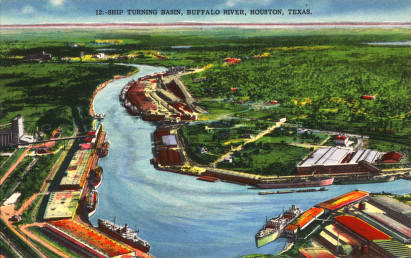
Ship Turning Basin, Buffalo River, Houston (postcard, circa 1914-1924)

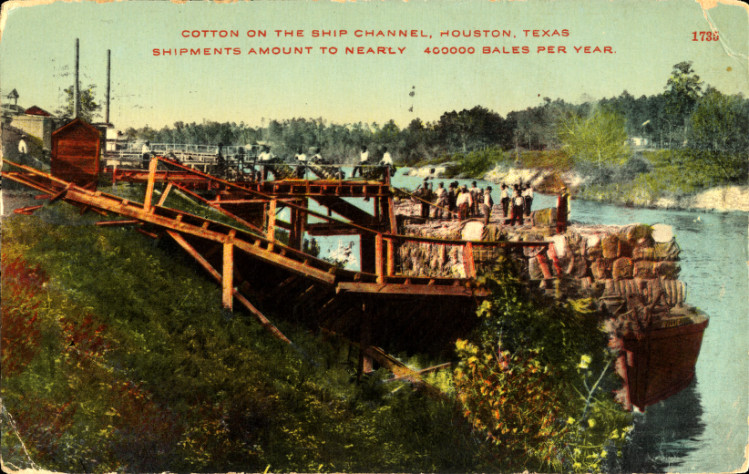
Cotton on the ship channel, Houston (circa, 1914)

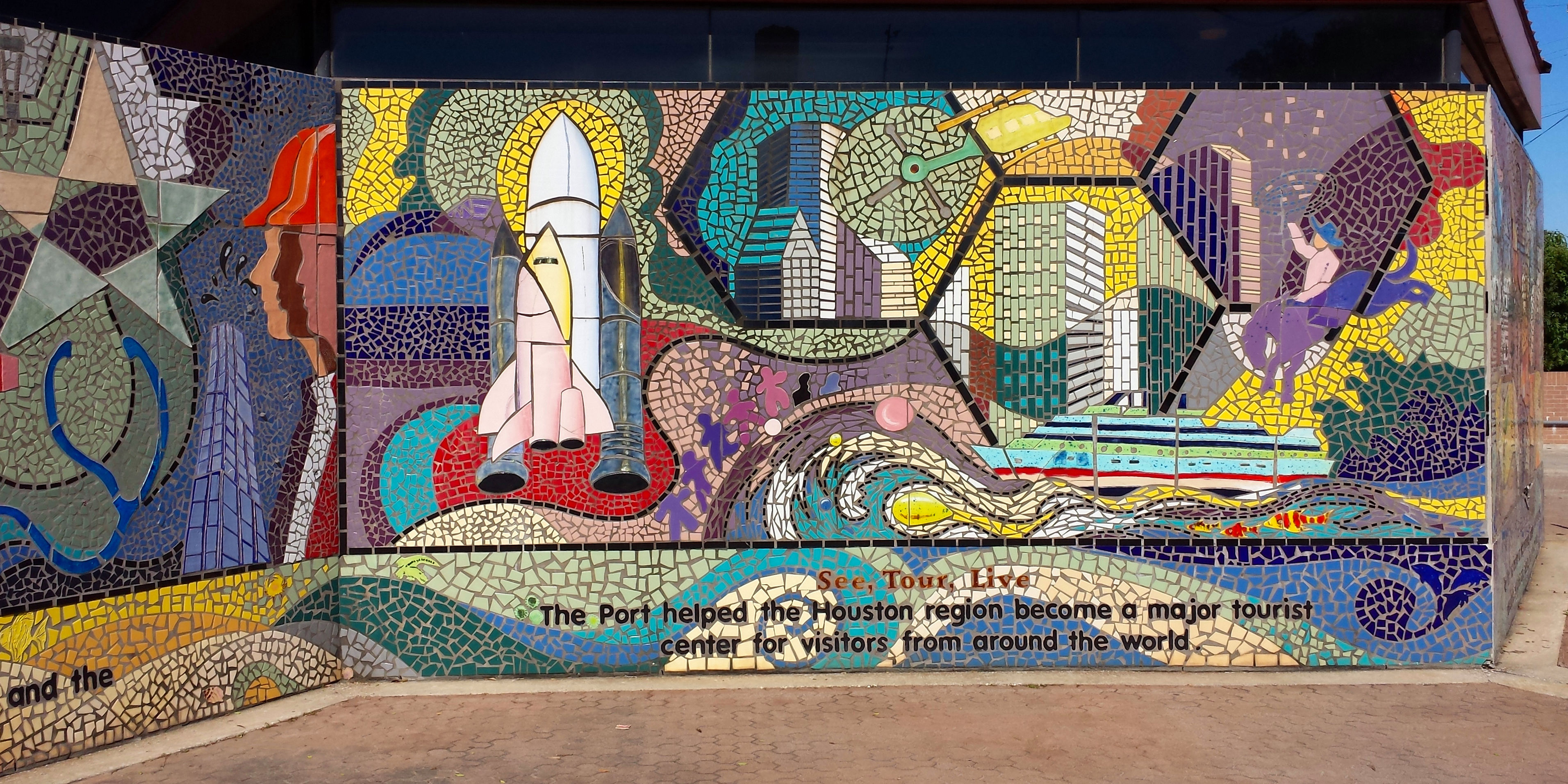
Mosaic tile mural at the Houston Ship Channel Visitor Center - 2016

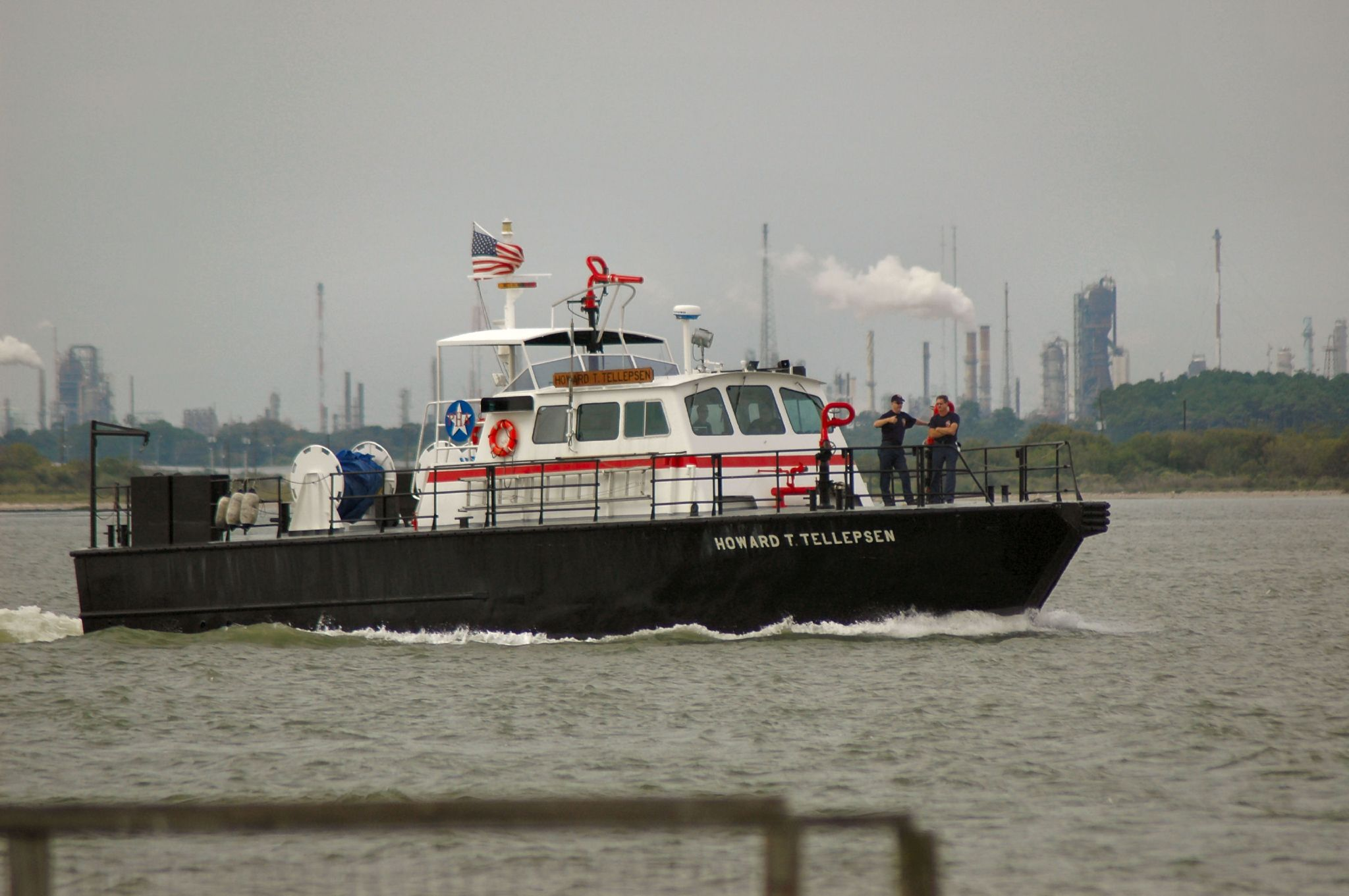
Fireboat Howard T. Tellepsen in the Houston Channel (2006)

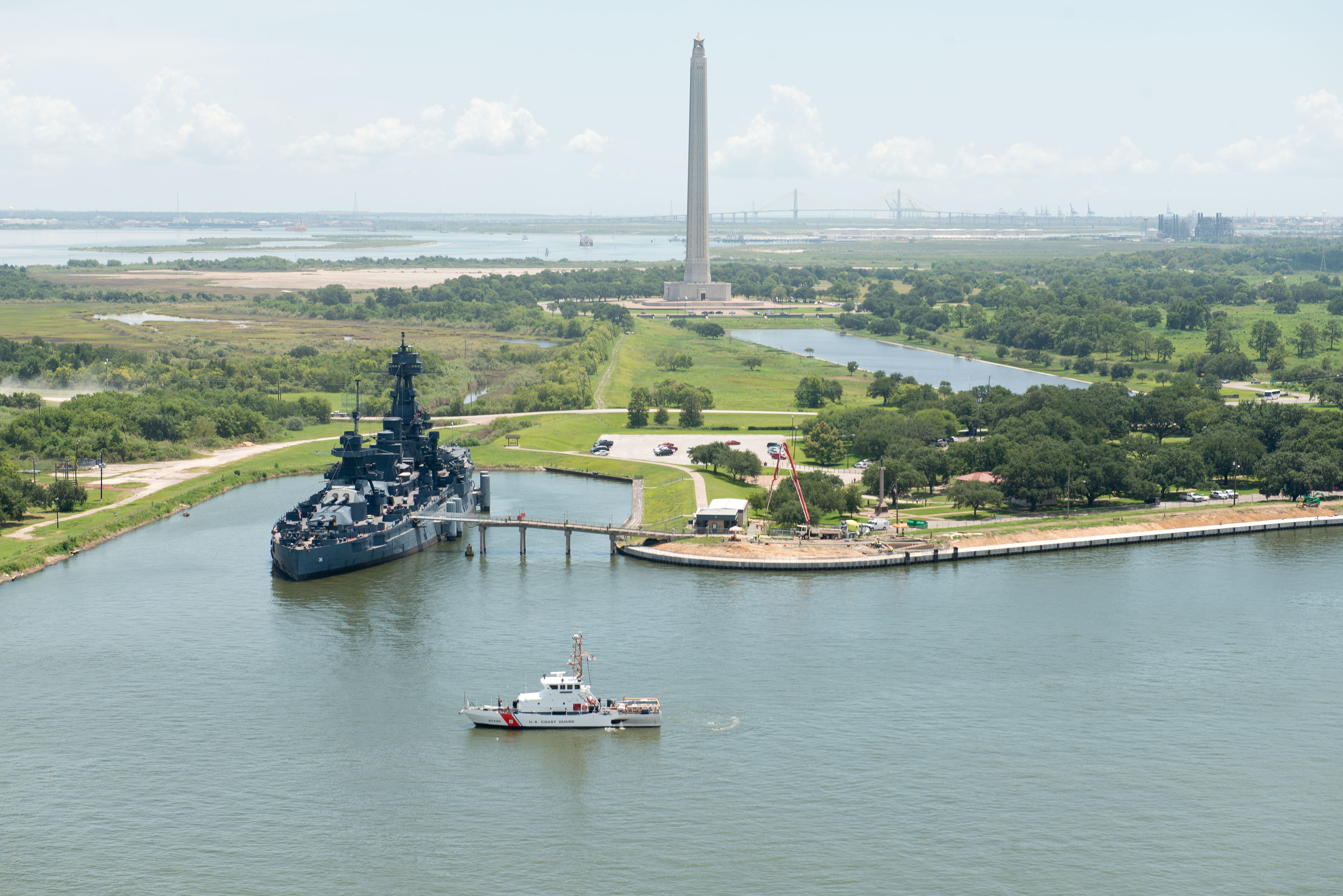
USS Texas museum is in the Houston Ship Channel

== See also ==
- Phillips disaster of 1989
- I-610 Ship Channel Bridge
