= Port of Houston =

- Logo of the Port of Houston Authority

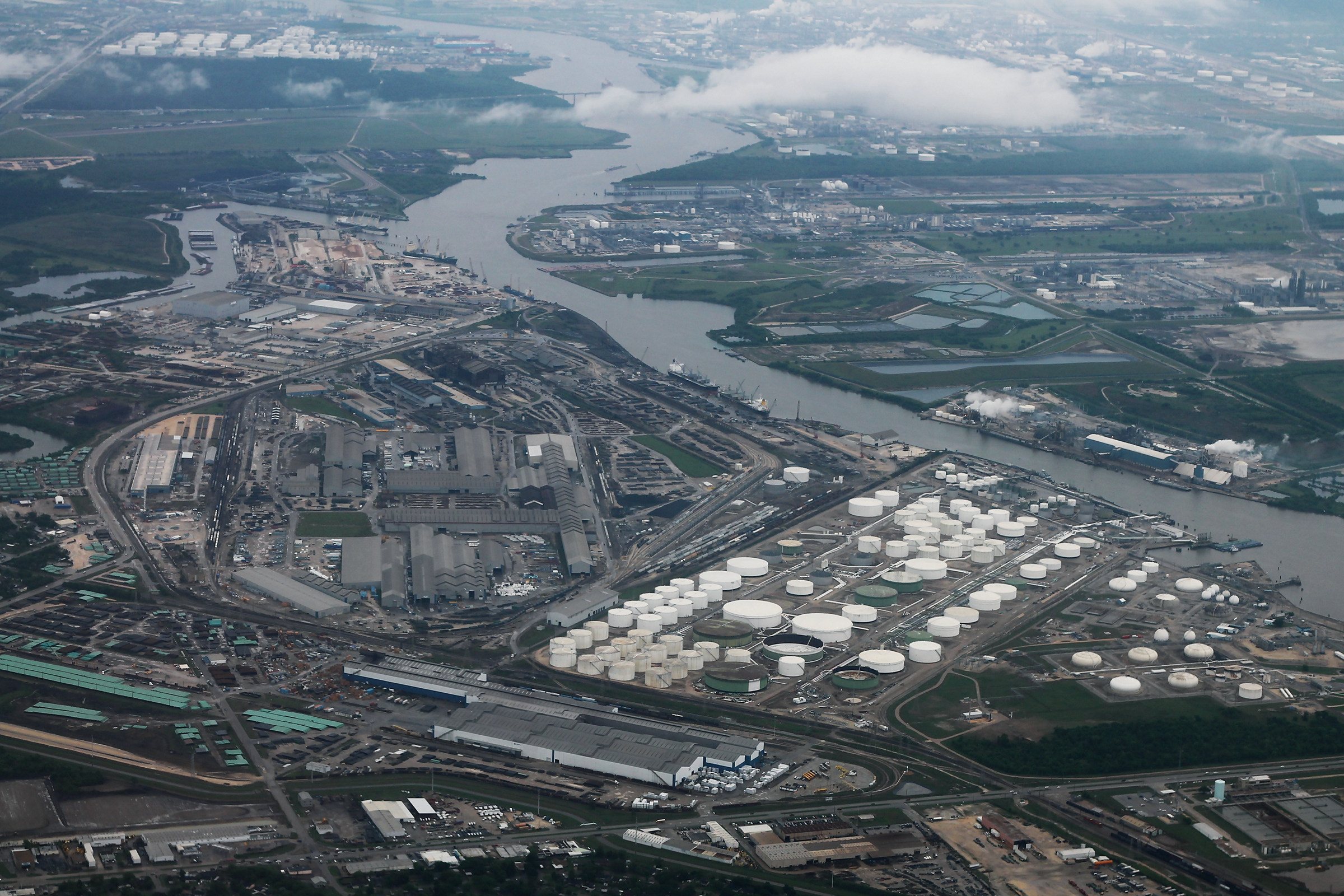
- Aerial view of the Greens Point Industrial Park at the port
- Interactive map of Port of Houston

Location
- Country: United States
- Location: Houston (Texas, USA)
- Coordinates: 29°43′N 95°15′W
- UN/LOCODE: USHOU

Details
- Operated by: Port of Houston Authority
- Owned by: City of Houston
- Type of Harbor: Artificial / natural
- Number of cargo container terminals: 2
- Number of major general cargo terminals: 5

Statistics
- Annual cargo tonnage: 212 million (2006)
- Annual container volume: 1.6 million TEUs (2006)
- Annual revenue: US$168 million (2006)
- Net income: US$42 million (2006)
- Economic value: US$118 billion (2006)
- Attributable jobs: 785,000 (2006)
- Draft depth: 45 feet
- Website http://www.porthouston.com

The Port of Houston is one of the world's largest ports and serves the metropolitan area of Houston, Texas. The port is a 50-mile-long (80 km) complex of diversified public and private facilities located a few hours' sailing time from the Gulf of Mexico. Located in the fourth-largest city in the United States, it is the busiest port in the U.S. in terms of foreign tonnage and the busiest in the U.S. in terms of overall tonnage. Though originally the port's terminals were primarily within the Houston city limits, the port has expanded to such a degree that today it has facilities in multiple communities in the surrounding area. In particular the port's busiest terminal, the Barbours Cut Terminal, is located in Morgan's Point.

The Port of Houston is a cooperative entity consisting of both the port authority, which operates the major terminals along the Houston Ship Channel, and more than 150 private companies situated along Buffalo Bayou and Galveston Bay. Many petroleum corporations have built refineries along the channel where they are partially protected from the threat of major storms in the Gulf of Mexico. The petrochemical complex associated with the Port of Houston is one of the largest in the world.

== History ==
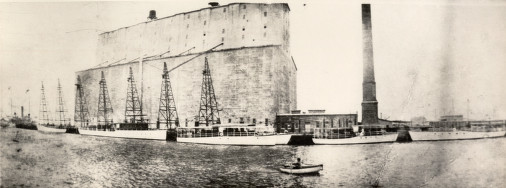
Lifting towers at the port of Houston in the late 19th or early 20th century.

The original Port of Houston was located at the confluence of Buffalo Bayou and White Oak Bayou in downtown Houston by the University of Houston–Downtown. This area is called "Allen's Landing" and is now a park. It is the birthplace of the City of Houston.

Shipping points grew at multiple locations on Buffalo Bayou including the port of Harrisburg (now part of Houston) and the docks on the Allen Ranch. By the end of the 19th century Buffalo Bayou had become a major shipping channel with traffic beginning to rival Galveston.

The citizens of Harris County approved creation of the modern port in 1909, believing that an inland port would better serve the region after the destructive Galveston Hurricane of 1900. President Woodrow Wilson officially opened the port to traffic as the World Port of Houston and Buffalo Bayou on November 10, 1914. In the 1930s the Port became the focus of labor conflict, with sometimes intense battles between strikers and authorities, during the 1935 Gulf Coast longshoremen's strike and the 1936 Gulf Coast maritime workers' strike among other incidents.

In 1911, there was a campaign persuading voters to approve a $1.25 million bond to raise money for dredging the waterway. The campaign was successful and voters approved the bond issuance and creation of the Harris County Houston Ship Channel Navigation District that is called Port of Houston Authority (POHA) today.

Early supporters would prove to be correct; the port has grown to be one of the world's largest. By 1961, it was already among the busiest ports in the US. In 1977 the Port of Houston opened the Barbours Cut Terminal, Texas' first cargo container terminal, at Morgan's Point. This new terminal, in the Bay Area, quickly became the port's most important terminal. The opening of the Bayport Terminal in 2006 further extended the port authority's reach outside the city of Houston.

Approximately 215 million short tons (195 Mt) of cargo moved through the Port in 2005, most of which is petroleum related. The Port has two separate terminals dedicated to the handling of cargo containers: Barbours Cut (at Morgan's Point), and Bayport (in Pasadena, opened in October 2006). The Barbours Cut terminal was, in fact, the port's first terminal specifically designed for these shipments. Additional general cargo terminals include Turning Basin, Jacintoport, Woodhouse, and Care.

A renovation project for the Port's Turning Basin Terminal began in 2010 and is expected to take 10 years. The Turning Basin Terminal is a multipurpose complex with open wharves and 37 docks that are used for direct discharge and loading of breakbulk, containerized, project or heavy-lift cargoes. The goal of the renovation is to accommodate the increase in the transportation of steel, which increased more than 3.1 million short tons (2.8 Mt) in the first nine months of 2011, up from 1.9 million short tons (1.7 Mt) over the same period in the previous year.

== The port today ==
Houston’s Port is an essential economic engine for the Houston region, the state of Texas, and the U.S. In 2024, Port Houston’s public terminals handled 53,066,219 short tons of cargo, a 6% increase over 2023. During the same period, container traffic rose 8%, reaching 4,139,991 TEUs. Meanwhile, the broader shipping channel under Port Houston’s jurisdiction recorded approximately 309.5 million short tons of cargo in 2023, up 5.3% from the prior year.

The Port Authority offers a 90-minute free cruise aboard the M/V Sam Houston, details of which can be found on its website. Since the Houston Ship Channel is closed to recreational traffic, this is the only means by which the general public can view port operations, and thus the tours are highly popular.

Most Volkswagen and Audi automobiles sold in North America pass through the port of Houston.

The Port is operated by the Port of Houston Authority, an independent political subdivision of the State of Texas governed by a seven-member commission. The City of Houston and the Harris County Commissioners Court each appoint two commissioners; these two governmental entities also jointly appoint the chairman of the Port Commission. The Harris County Mayors and Councils Association and the City of Pasadena each appoint one commissioner. Daily operations are overseen by an CEO who serves at the will of the Commission.

=== Trade data ===
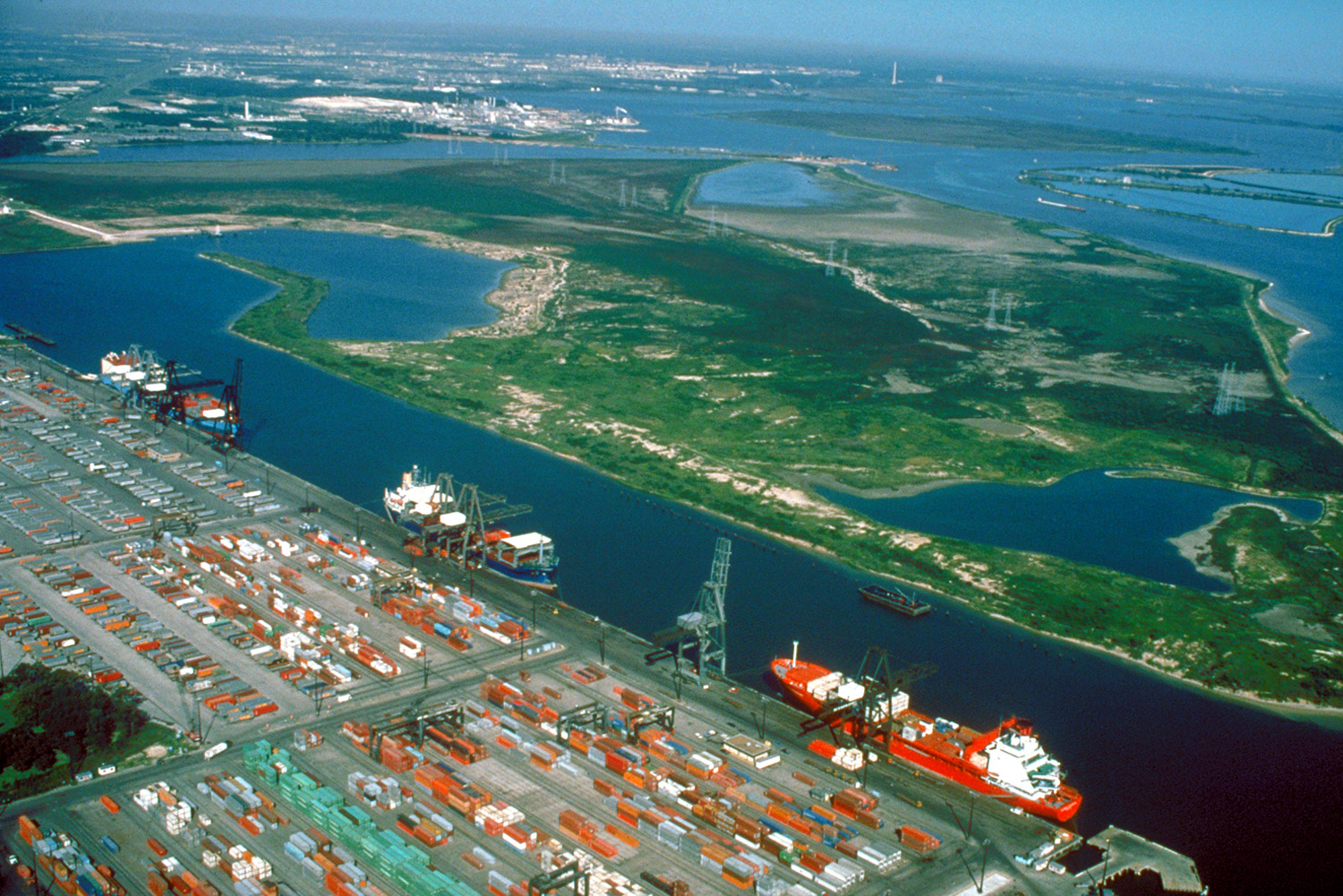
The Barbours Cut Terminal

The Port of Houston is a major point of international trade for the United States. The following is the trade volume by world region reported by the Greater Houston Partnership as of 2006.

- Europe 31%
- Latin America 22%
- Asia/Pacific Rim 15%
- North America 13%
- Middle East 7%
- Africa 12%

=== Foreign Trade Zone ===
The Port of Houston Authority manages Foreign Trade Zone (FTZ) No. 84, which includes many privately owned and port-owned sites located throughout Houston and Harris County, Texas. The Houston Zone offers users special benefits. For example, customs duties on imported goods entering the FTZ can be delayed until the cargo is removed from the zone. No duty is paid if the merchandise is exported directly from the zone.

The following Sub Zones are a part of The Port of Houston FTZ No. 84:

- 84E Gulf Coast Maritime
- 84F Valero Refining Co.
- 84H Shaffer, Inc.
- 84I Tuboscope Vetco Int'l
- 84J Shell Oil Co.
- 84K Dril-Quip
- 84L Tadiran Microwave Networks
- 84M Hydril USA Manufacturing LLC
- 84N Pasadena Refining System, Inc.
- 84O ExxonMobil
- 84P Houston Refining LP
- 84Q Equistar Chemicals
- 84R Michelin North America, Inc.

=== List of firsts ===
Despite being one of the youngest major ports in the world (the port reached its 100th birthday in 2014) it has racked up a list of firsts.

Notable firsts include:

- First port to be built with federal funds and local matching funds, thus guaranteeing local support (every port since 1930 has had a local match requirement)
- First direct shipment of cotton to Europe (November 1919 via the M/V Merry Mount)
- First double-stack container train (1981)
- When the Baytown Tunnel was removed in 1997 to allow deepening and widening of the Houston Ship Channel (it was replaced by the Fred Hartman Bridge), it was the largest tunnel so removed (35 feet (11 m) diameter by 1,041 feet (317 m) length) without closing the channel, losing time due to accidents, or impacting the navigational safety of the port.
- First port to conduct air emissions testing of its off-road equipment (2000)
- First port to meet ISO 14001 standards for environmental excellence (2002), and the first port to be recertified to ISO 14001 standards (2004)

In 1968 Texas historian Marilyn McAdams Sibley published The Port of Houston: A History.

== See also ==
- United States container ports
