= Oil in Texas =

Oil is a major part of the Texas economy. Texas has consistently been the leading oil producing state in the United States and in 2024, set a new record when 2 billion barrels were produced for the first time ever. It was first detected in 1543 on the water in Galveston Bay. The first oil well was drilled in 1866. Oil in Texas took off in 1901.

== History ==
The history of oil in Texas dates back to July, 1543 when Spanish explorer Luis de Moscoso Alvarado detected it floating on the water in Galveston Bay. The first oil well was drilled by Lyne T. Barret in 1866. Oil in Texas took off in 1901 when Anthony Francis Lucas, an immigrant to the United States from Croatia (Then Austria-Hungary) along with Pattillo Higgins successfully drilled for oil in what is now known as Spindletop.

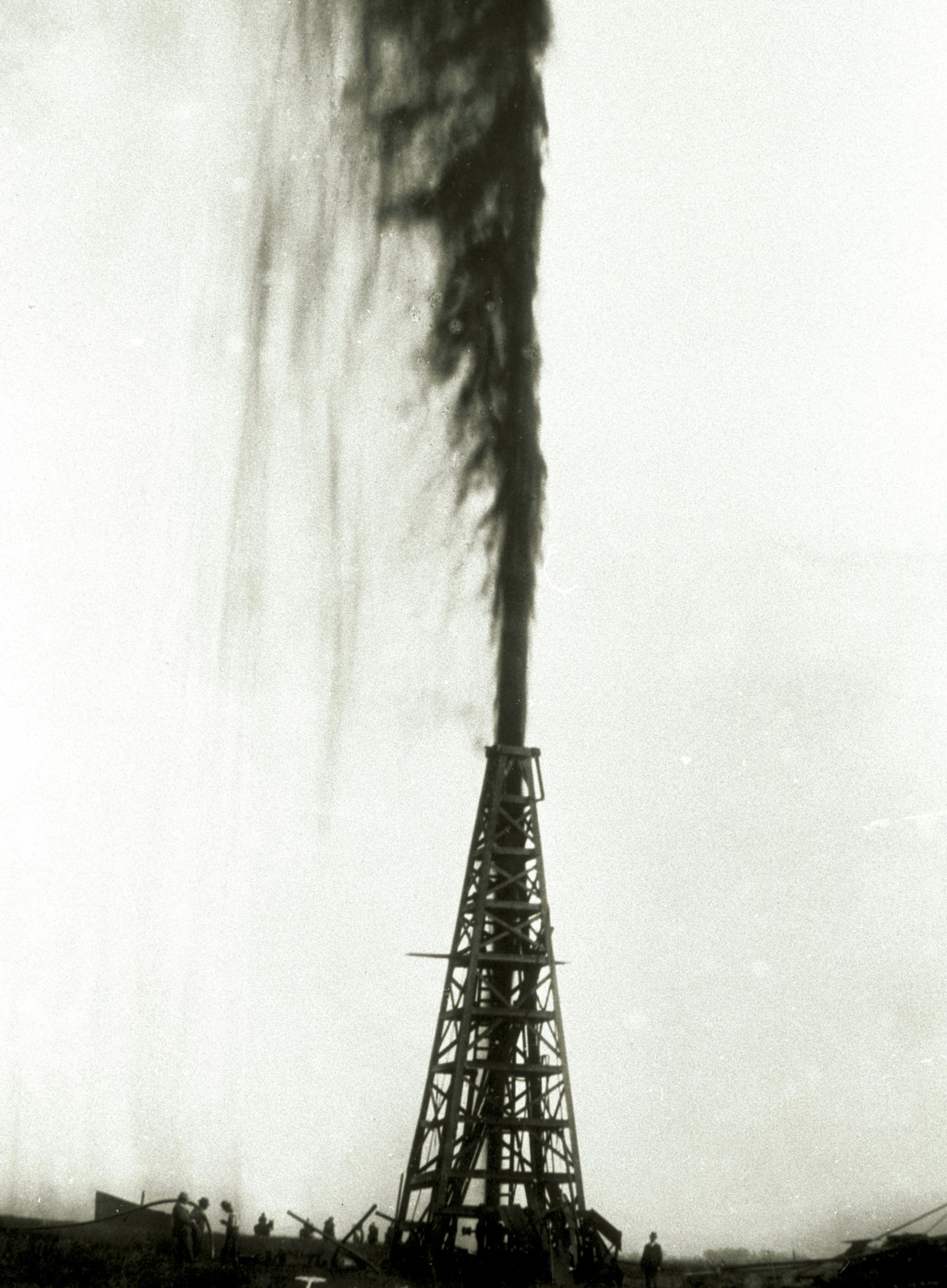
The Lucas Gusher at Spindletop. The Spindletop oil field is considered by some to be the start of the petroleum age.

== Oil producing regions ==
Major oil producing regions in Texas include the East Texas Oil Field and the Permian Basin. During the first half of the twentieth century, these regions developed around boomtowns such as Longview and Midland.

== Regulation ==
The production of oil in Texas is regulated by the Railroad Commission of Texas. The commission engages in three main types of regulation: resource conservation, proration of production, and protecting the correlative rights of both producers and royalty owners.

== Production statistics ==
The following table shows total oil production (including both crude oil and condensate) from 2015 to 2024.

| Year | Oil Production (Barrels) |
|---|---|
| 2015 | 1,004,774 (Mbbl) |
| 2016 | 974,612 (Mbbl) |
| 2017 | 1,026,765 (Mbbl) |
| 2018 | 1,274,569 (Mbbl) |
| 2019 | 1,864,858,908 |
| 2020 | 1,774,993,734 |
| 2021 | 1,746,344,255 |
| 2022 | 1,870,340,614 |
| 2023 | 1,999,474,968 |
| 2024 | 2,039,926,150 |

== Oil companies in Texas ==
The main commercial hub for the North American Oil industry, notable companies with headquarters or North American Headquarters in Texas include:

- BP (North American Headquarters)
- Chevron
- ConocoPhillips
- Exxonmobil
- Shell PLC (United States Headquarters)
- Tesoro
- Valero

== Notable people ==
- Bud Adams
- George H. W. Bush
- George W Bush
- T Boone Pickens
- Hugh Roy Cullen
- H.L. Hunt
- Clint Murchison Sr.
- Sid Richardson
- Autry Stephens

== See also ==
- Energy law
- Texas oil boom
- United States energy law
- United States energy policy
