= Texas oil boom =

Period of change and economic growth in Texas

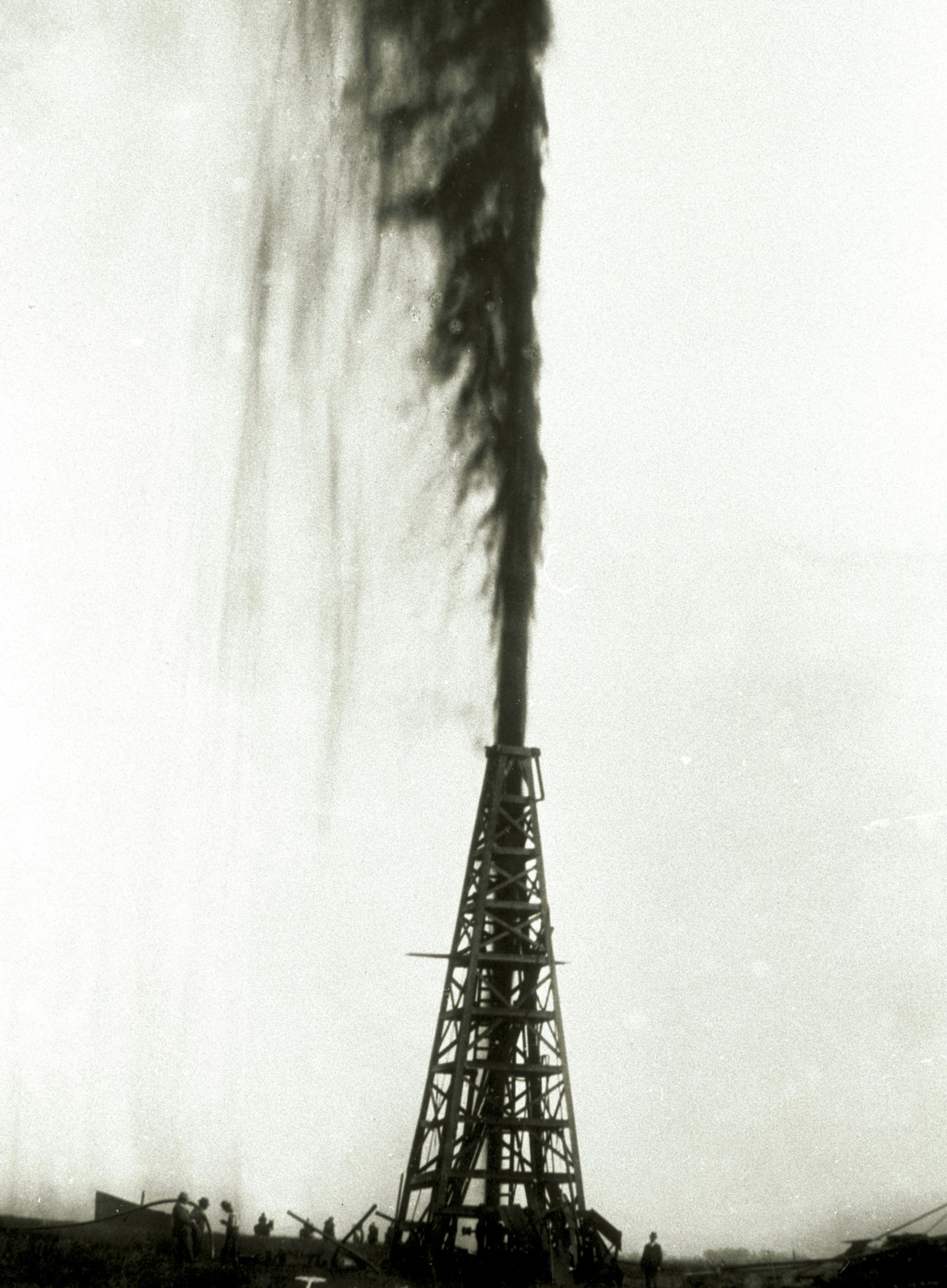
- The Lucas gusher at Spindletop, the first major gusher in Texas
- Date: 1901–1940s
- Location: Texas, United States
- Also known as: Gusher age

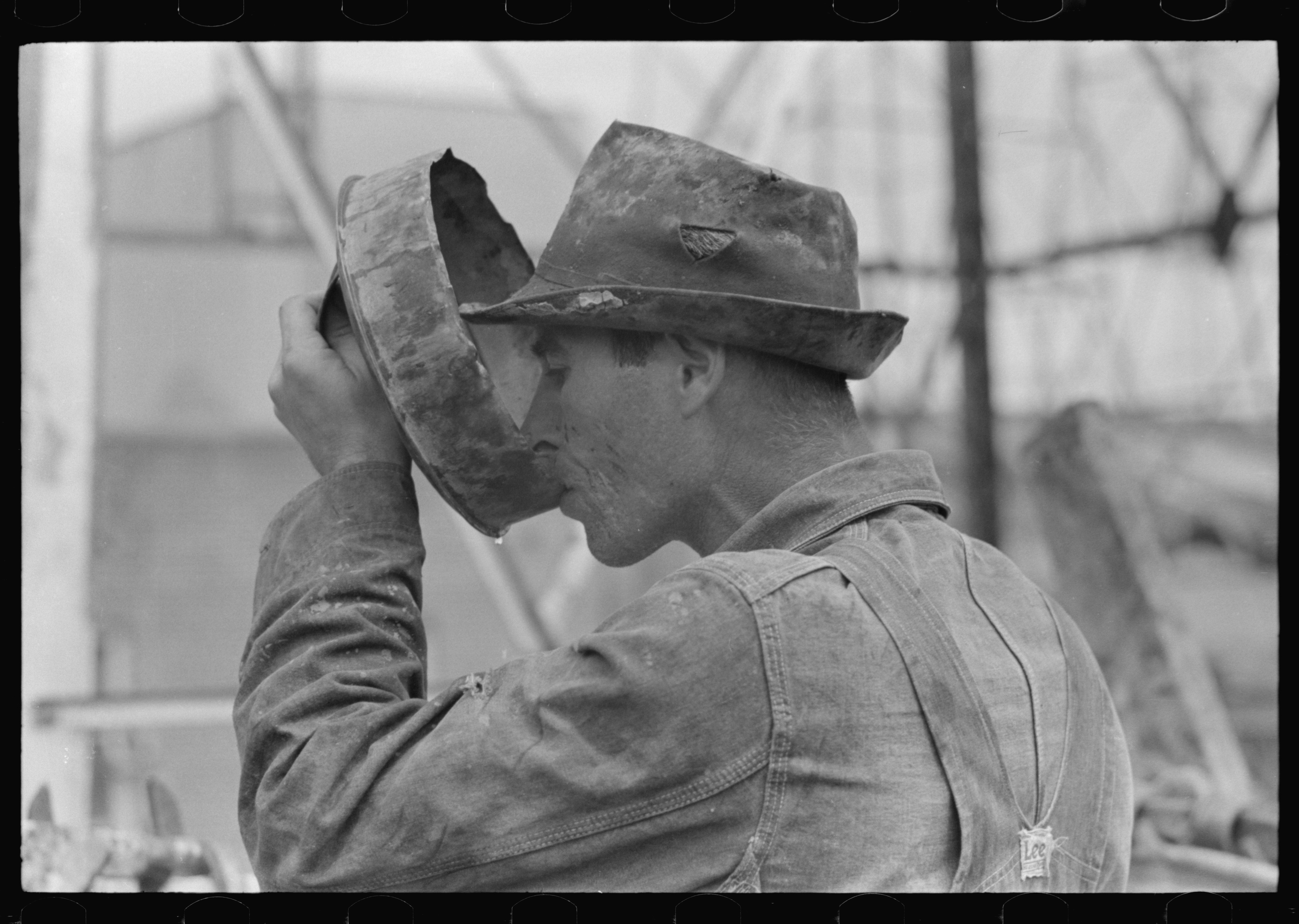
A drill-man drinking from a battered pan during the Texas oil boom in Kilgore, Texas—a snapshot of boomtown grit and improvisation (Lone Driller's Water Break, 1939)

The Texas oil boom, sometimes called the gusher age, was a period of dramatic change and economic growth in the U.S. state of Texas during the early 20th century that began with the discovery of a large petroleum reserve at Spindletop near Beaumont, Texas. The find was unprecedented anywhere in its size and ushered in an age of rapid regional development and industrialization that has few parallels in U.S. history. Texas quickly became one of the leading oil-producing states in the U.S., along with Oklahoma and California; soon the nation overtook the Russian Empire as the top producer of petroleum. By 1940 Texas had come to dominate U.S. production. Some historians even define the beginning of the world's Oil Age as the beginning of this era in Texas.

The major petroleum strikes that began the rapid growth in petroleum exploration and speculation occurred in Southeast Texas, but soon reserves were found across Texas and wells were constructed in North Texas, East Texas, and the Permian Basin in West Texas. Although limited reserves of oil had been struck during the 19th century, the strike at Spindletop near Beaumont in 1901 gained national attention, spurring exploration and development that continued through the 1920s and beyond. Spindletop and the Joiner strike in East Texas, at the outset of the Great Depression, were the key strikes that launched this era of change in the state.

This period had a transformative effect on Texas. At the turn of the century, the state was predominantly rural with no large cities. By the end of World War II, the state was heavily industrialized, and the populations of Texas cities had broken into the top 20 nationally. The city of Houston was among the greatest beneficiaries of the boom, and the Houston area became home to the largest concentration of refineries and petrochemical plants in the world. The city grew from a small commercial center in 1900 to one of the largest cities in the United States during the decades following the era. This period, however, changed all of Texas' commercial centers (and developed the Beaumont/Port Arthur area, where the boom began).

H. Roy Cullen, H. L. Hunt, Sid W. Richardson, and Clint Murchison were the four most influential businessmen during this era. These men became among the wealthiest and most politically powerful in the state and the nation.

== Timeframe ==
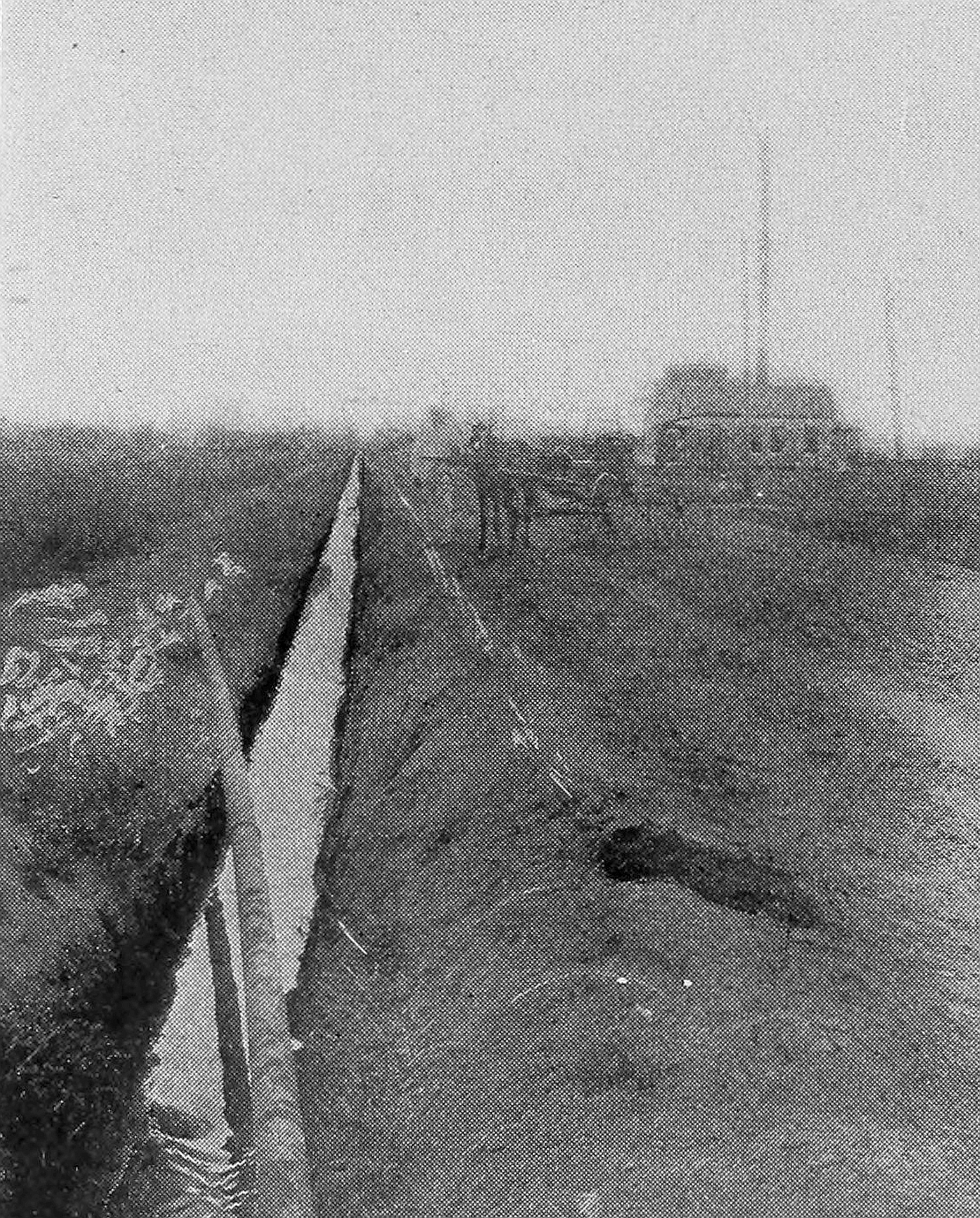
Oil flowing through an open ditch in Texas, 1911

Several events in the 19th century have been regarded as a beginning of oil-related growth in Texas, one of the earliest being the opening of the Corsicana oil field in 1894. Nevertheless, most historians consider the Spindletop strike of 1901, at the time the world's most productive petroleum well ever found, to be the beginning point. This single discovery began a rapid pattern of change in Texas and brought worldwide attention to the state.

By the 1940s, the Texas Railroad Commission, which had been given regulatory control of the Texas oil industry, managed to stabilize American oil production and eliminate most of the wild price swings that were common during the earlier years of the boom. Many small towns, such as Wortham, which had become boomtowns during the 1920s saw their booms end in the late 1920s and early 1930s as their local economies collapsed, resulting from their dependence on relatively limited petroleum reservoirs. As production peaked in some of these smaller fields and the Great Depression lowered demand, investors fled. In the major refining and manufacturing centers such as Beaumont, Houston, and Dallas, the boom continued to varying degrees until the end of World War II. By the end of the war, the economies of the major urban areas of the state had matured. Though Texas continued to prosper and grow, the extreme growth patterns and dramatic socioeconomic changes of the earlier years largely subsided as the cities settled into more sustainable patterns of growth. Localized booms in West Texas and other areas, however, continued to transform some small communities during the post-war period.

== Background ==
=== Post-Civil War Texas ===
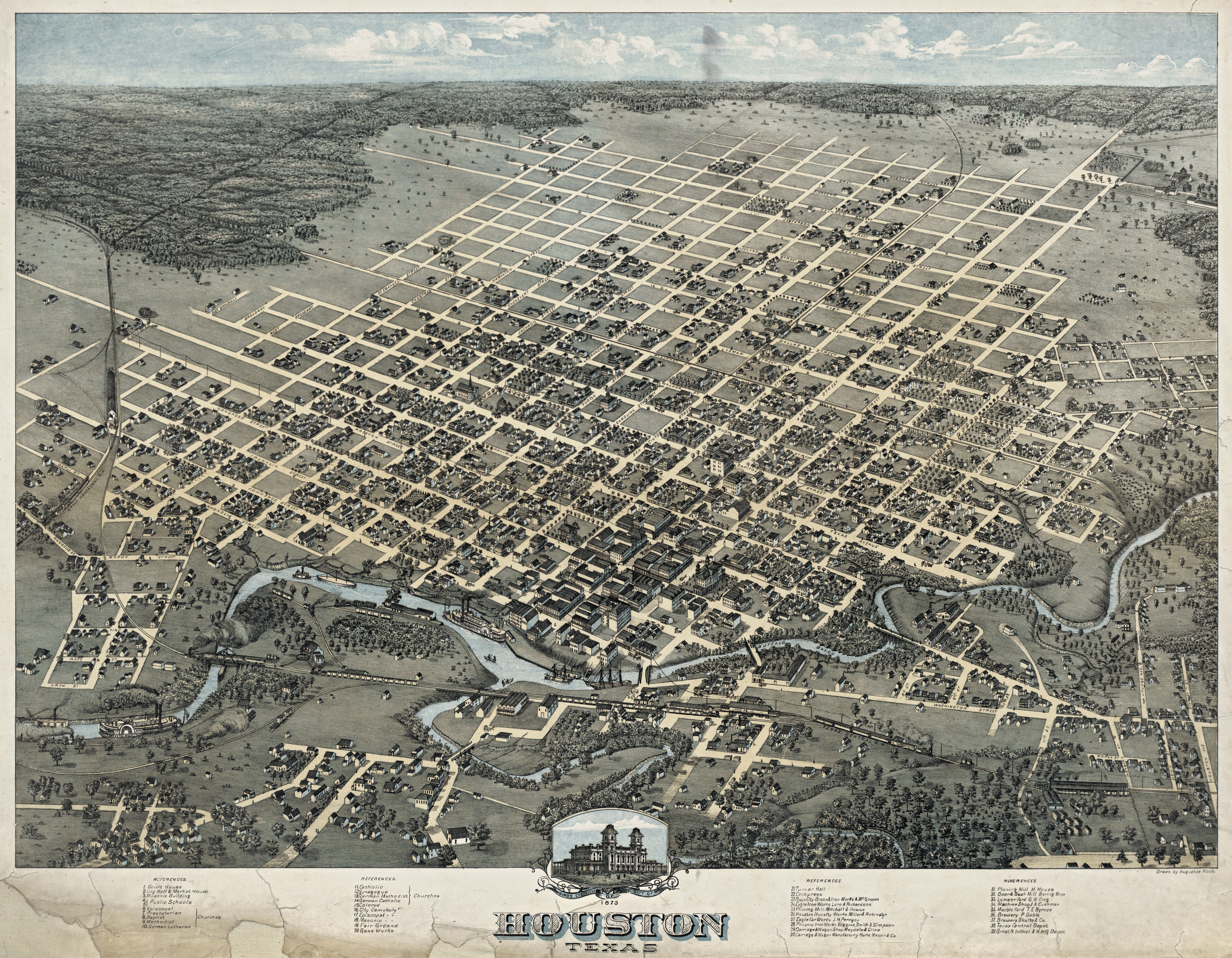
Houston, c. 1873

Following the American Civil War, Texas's economy began to develop rapidly centered heavily on cattle ranching and cotton farming, and later lumber. Galveston became the world's top cotton shipping port and Texas' largest commercial center. By 1890, however, Dallas had exceeded Galveston's population, and in the early 1900s the Port of Houston began to challenge Galveston's dominance.

In 1900 a massive hurricane struck Galveston, destroying much of the city. That and another storm in 1915 shifted much of the focus from investors away from Galveston and toward nearby Houston, which was seen as a safer location for commercial operations. Because of these events, the coming oil boom became heavily centered on the city of Houston both as a port and a commercial center.

Though Texas had notable urban areas at the turn of the century, it was still a predominantly rural state. Texas was largely open range, meaning that livestock could freely roam throughout the state.

=== Early history of petroleum ===
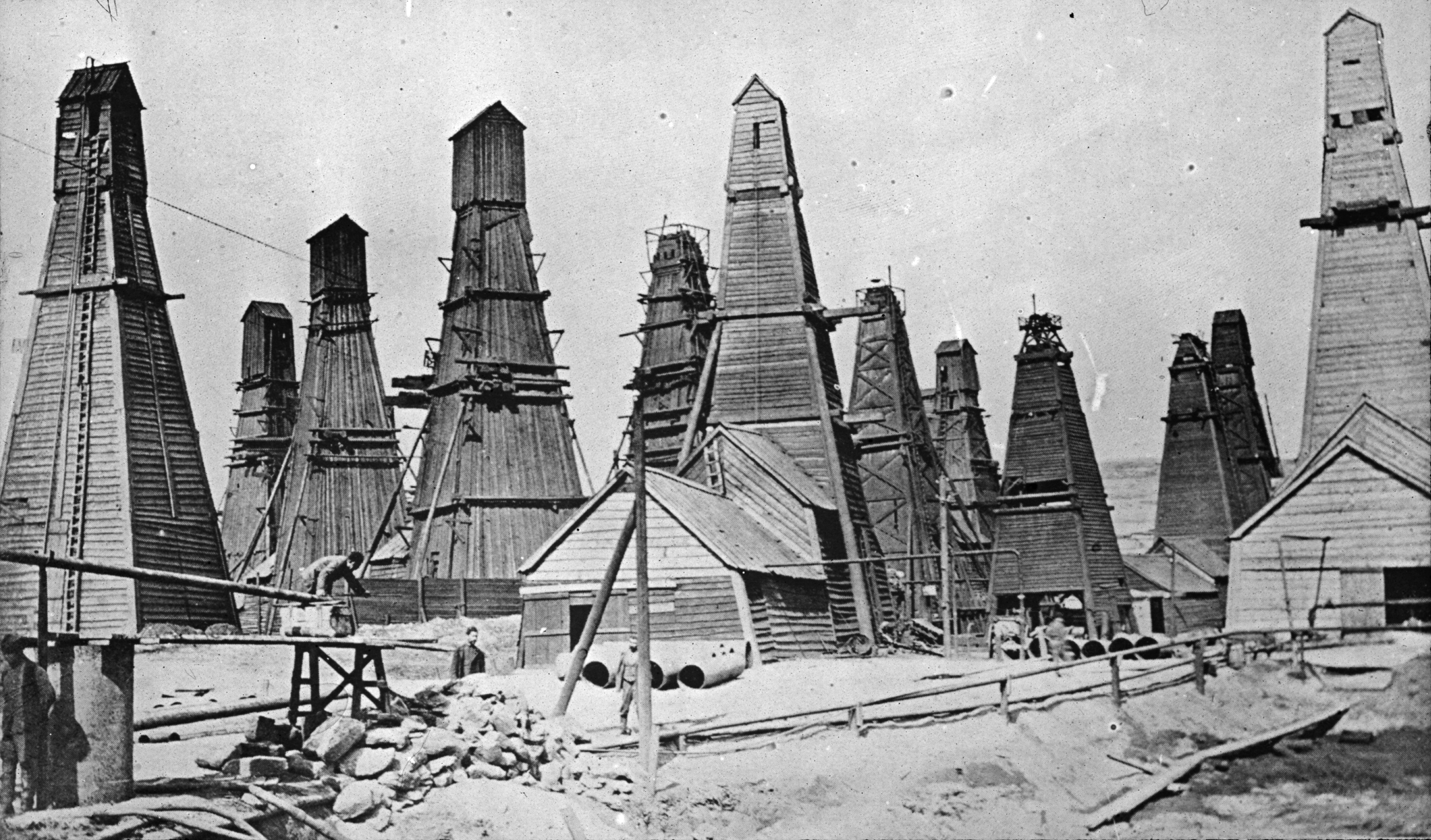
Early petroleum wells in Balakhani/Sabunchi, Azerbaijan

In the 1850s, the process to distill kerosene from petroleum was invented by Abraham Gesner. The demand for the petroleum as a fuel for lighting around the world quickly grew. Petroleum exploration developed in many parts of the world with the Russian Empire, particularly the Branobel company in Azerbaijan, taking the lead in production by the end of the 19th century.

In 1859, Edwin Drake of Pennsylvania invented a drilling process to extract oil from deep within the earth. Drake's invention is credited with giving birth to the oil industry in the U.S. The first oil refiner in the United States opened in 1861 in Western Pennsylvania, during the Pennsylvanian oil rush. Standard Oil, which had been founded by John D. Rockefeller in Ohio, became a multi-state trust and came to dominate the young petroleum industry in the U.S.

Texans knew of the oil that lay beneath the ground in the state for decades, but this was often seen more as a problem than a benefit because it hindered the digging of water wells. Rancher William Thomas Waggoner (1852–1934), who later became an influential oil businessman in Fort Worth, struck oil while drilling for water in 1902. He was quoted as having said, "I wanted water, and they got me oil. I tell you I was mad, mad clean through. We needed water for ourselves and for our cattle to drink."

Despite the earlier negative associations with oil among many ranchers and farmers, demand for kerosene and other petroleum derivatives drove oil prospecting in Texas after the American Civil War at known oil-producing springs and accidental finds while drilling for water. One of the first significant wells in Texas was developed near the town of Oil Springs, near Nacogdoches. The site began production in 1866. The first oilfield in Texas with a substantial economic impact was developed in 1894 near Corsicana. In 1898, the field built the state's first modern refinery. The success of the Corsicana field and increasing demand for oil worldwide led to more exploration around the state.

=== Mechanization ===
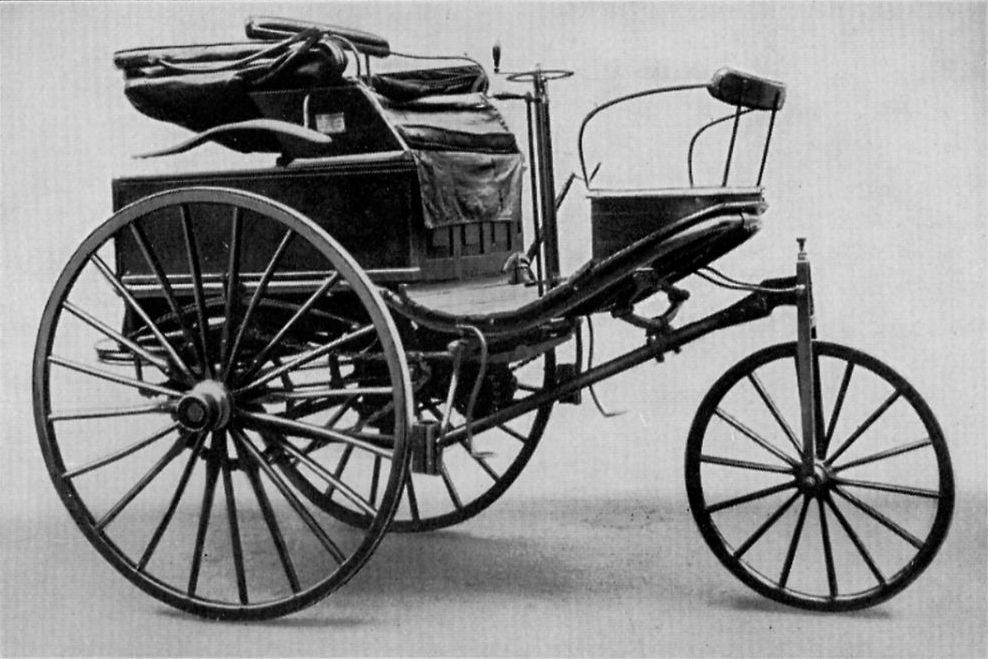
A Benz Motorwagen, c. 1888

In 1879, Karl Benz was granted the first patent on a reliable gasoline-powered engine in Germany. In 1885, he produced the first true gasoline automobile, the Benz Patent Motorwagen. The new invention was quickly refined and gained popularity in Germany and France, and interest grew in the United Kingdom and the United States. In 1902, Ransom Olds created the production line concept for mass-producing lower-cost automobiles. Henry Ford soon refined the concept so that by 1914, middle-class laborers could afford automobiles built by Ford Motor Company.

Automobile production exploded in the U.S. and in other nations during the 1920s. This, and the increasing use of petroleum derivatives to power factories and industrial equipment, substantially increased worldwide demand for oil.

== Growth of "Big Oil" ==
=== Spindletop ===
After years of failed attempts to extract oil from the salt domes near Beaumont, a small enterprise known as the Gladys City Oil, Gas, and Manufacturing Company was joined in 1899 by Croatian/Austrian mechanical engineer Anthony F. Lucas, an expert in salt domes. Lucas joined the company in response to the numerous ads the company's founder Pattillo Higgins placed in industrial magazines and trade journals. Lucas and his colleagues struggled for two years to find oil at a location known as Spindletop Hill before making a strike in 1901. The new well produced approximately 100,000 barrels of oil per day, an unprecedented level of production at the time. The 1902 total annual production at Spindletop exceeded 17 million barrels. The state's total production in 1900 had been only 836,000 barrels. The overabundance of supply led oil prices in the U.S. to drop to a record low of 3 cents per barrel, less than the price of water in some areas.

Beaumont almost instantly became a boomtown with investors from around the state and the nation participating in land speculation. Investment in Texas speculation in 1901 reached approximately $235 million US (approximately $9.09 billion in present-day terms). The level of oil speculation in Pennsylvania and other areas of the United States was quickly surpassed by the speculation in Texas. The Lucas gusher itself was short-lived; production fell to 10,000 barrels per day by 1904. The strike, however, was only the beginning of a much larger trend.

=== Discoveries spread ===
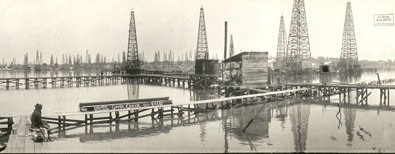
Goose Creek Oil Field, c. 1919

Exploration of salt domes across the plains of the Texas Gulf Coast took off with major oil fields opening at Sour Lake in 1902, Batson in 1903, Humble in 1905, and Goose Creek (modern Baytown) in 1908. Pipelines and refineries were built throughout much of Southeast Texas, leading to substantial industrialization, particularly around Houston and the Galveston Bay. The first offshore oilfield in the state opened in 1917 at Black Duck Bay on the Goose Creek field, although serious offshore exploration did not begin until the 1930s.

Initially, oil production was conducted by many small producers. The early exploration and production frenzy produced an unstable supply of oil, which often resulted in overproduction. In the early years, a few major finds led to easy availability and major drops in prices, but were followed by limited exploration and a sudden spike in prices as production dwindled. The situation led exploration to spread into the neighboring states of Oklahoma, Louisiana, and Arkansas, which competed with Texas for dominance in oil production. The Glenn Pool strike near Tulsa, Oklahoma in 1905 established Tulsa as the leading U.S. oil production center until the 1930s. Though Texas soon lagged behind Oklahoma and California, it was still a major producer.

During the late 1910s and 1920s, oil exploration and production continued to expand and stabilize. Oil production became established in North Texas, Central Texas, the Panhandle, and the Permian Basin in western Texas. The finds in North Texas, beginning with the 1917 strike in the Ranger Oil Boom west of Dallas-Fort Worth, were particularly significant, bringing substantial industrialization to the area and contributing to the war effort during World War I. Texas soon became dominant as the nation's leading oil producer. By 1940, Texas production was twice that of California, the next largest U.S. producer.

=== East Texas Oil Boom ===
In 1930, Columbus Marion Joiner, a self-educated prospector, discovered the East Texas Oil Field, the largest oil discovery that had ever been made. Because East Texas had not been significantly explored for oil before then, numerous independent prospectors, known as "wildcatters", were able to purchase tracts of land to exploit the new field. This new oil field helped to revive Dallas's economy during the Great Depression, but sharply decreased interest in West Texas as the new supply led to another major drop in oil prices. The uncontrolled production in the eastern field destabilized the state's oil industry, which had been trying to control production levels to stabilize prices. Overproduction in East Texas was so great that then-governor Ross Sterling attempted to shut down many of the wells. During one of the forced closures, he ordered the Texas National Guard to enforce the shutdown. These efforts at controlling production, intended to protect both the independent operators and the major producers, were largely unsuccessful at first and led to widespread oil smuggling. In the later 1930s, the federal government intervened and brought production to sustainable levels, leading to a stabilization of price fluctuation. The income provided by the stabilization allowed less populated West Texas and the Panhandle to be more fully explored and exploited.

=== Emergence of an industry ===
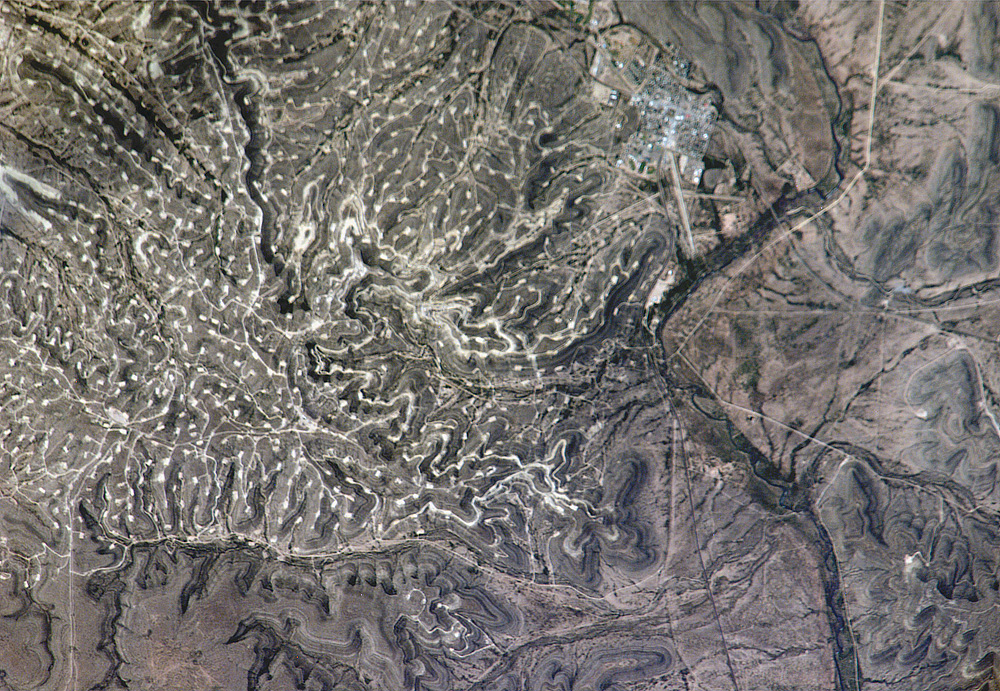
Satellite view of the Yates Oil Field in West Texas. The Pecos River crosses from north to south in the right third of the picture.

The first refining operations at Corsicana were built by Joseph S. Cullinan, a former manager for Standard Oil in Pennsylvania. His company, which was later absorbed by Magnolia Petroleum Company and then acquired by Standard Oil of New York, built the first modern refinery west of the Mississippi River. Following the strike at Spindletop, Cullinan partnered with Arnold Schlaet to form the Texas Fuel Company in Beaumont with funding from an investment group run by former Texas governor James S. Hogg and other investors. In 1905, as the new company rapidly expanded its operations, it moved its corporate headquarters to Houston. The company's strength in the oil industry established Houston as the center of the industry in Texas. The company was later absorbed into the Texas Company and then renamed Texaco.

The interests in the Lucas operation at Spindletop were purchased by J. M. Guffey and his associates, creating the Guffey Petroleum Company and Gulf Refining Company of Texas. These companies later became Gulf Oil Corporation, which decades later was bought by California's Chevron. Guffey's company became the largest oil producer in the state during the boom period. Standard Oil initially chose not to become directly involved in oil production in Texas, and instead formed Security Oil Company as a refining operation utilizing Guffey-Gulf and Texas Company as suppliers. Following state lawsuits related to anti-trust statutes, Security Oil was reorganized into Magnolia Petroleum Company in 1911. That same year, the Humble Oil Company (today Exxon Corporation) was formed by Ross Sterling and Walter William Fondren in Humble, Texas. The headquarters were moved to Houston, and the company eventually sold half of its shares to Standard Oil of New Jersey, establishing a long-term partnership that lasted for decades. The company built the Baytown Refinery, which became Texas' largest refining operation. In the post-World War II period, Humble became the largest crude oil transporter in the United States, and built pipelines connecting Baytown to Dallas-Fort Worth and West Texas to the Gulf of Mexico.

In spite of the few major operations, the first decade of the boom was dominated by numerous small producers. As production expanded and new companies were formed, consolidation occurred. By the late 1920s, ten companies produced more than half of the oil in the state: Gulf Production Company, Humble Oil, Southern Crude Oil Purchasing Company (later absorbed by Amoco which was later absorbed by BP), the Texas Company (Texaco), Shell Petroleum Corporation, Yount-Lee Oil Company, Magnolia Petroleum Company, J. K. Hughes Oil Company, Pure Oil Company, and Mid-Kansas Oil and Gas Company (later Marathon Oil).

During the 1930s, a Dallas company known as the General American Finance System, founded by Algur H. Meadows, Henry W. Peters and Ralph G. Trippett, struggling through the Great Depression, began to finance drilling operations throughout Texas using oil reserves as collateral. This allowed Dallas to establish itself as the financing center for the oil industry. The Great American Finance System eventually reorganized itself as the General American Oil Company of Texas, which became an oil producer in its own right and, decades later, was purchased by Phillips Petroleum.

== Effects ==
=== Economy ===
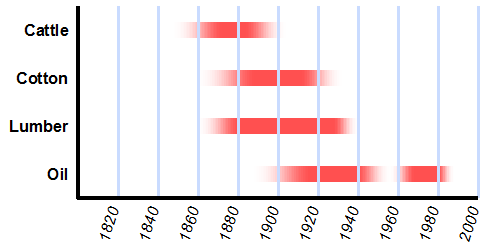
Boom periods of the four major industries that built the early Texas economy

The oil boom had substantial and long-lasting effects on the Texan economy. Oil-rich regions in Texas and adjacent states saw increased employment in the mining industry, but also growth in manufacturing and services. Wages and as a consequence household incomes increased significantly.

At the start of the 20th century, agriculture, timber, and ranching were the leading economic engines of Texas. This was changed by the boom, which led to rapid industrialization. Though refineries were initially concentrated around the Beaumont and Houston areas, refining operations gradually grew throughout the state by the end of the 1920s. By 1940, the value of petroleum and natural gas produced in Texas exceeded the value of all agricultural products in the state. The state's GDP grew from approximately $119 million ($4.61 billion in today's terms) in 1900 to approximately $29 billion ($332 billion in today's terms), a more than 240-fold increase. The U.S. GDP as a whole grew by less than 24 times during the same period.

The opening of Houston Ship Channel in 1914 led to the Port of Houston overtaking the Port of Galveston as the state's dominant seaport. The situation led Houston to also overtake Galveston as the primary shipping center for cotton. The large quantities of oil and gas moving through Houston, Baytown, Texas City, and surrounding communities made the area around the ship channel attractive for industrial development. Chemical plants, steel factories, cement plants, automobile manufacturing, and many other types of heavy industry that could benefit from a ready supply of cheap fuel rapidly developed in the area. By the 1930s, Houston had emerged as the state's dominant economic center, though it continued to compete with Dallas throughout the 1900s. The effects of the boom helped offset the effects of the Depression so much that Houston was called the "city the Depression forgot." Dallas and other Texas communities were also able to weather the Depression better than many American cities because of oil.

The boom in the oil industry also helped promote other industries in other areas of the state. Lumber production thrived as demand climbed for construction of railroads, refineries, and oil derricks, and, in 1907, Texas was the third largest lumber producer in the United States. Growing cities required many new homes and buildings, thus benefiting the construction industry. Agriculture and ranching grew stronger as the rapidly expanding population created more demand for their produce.

=== Demographics ===
Population growth
| City | Percent growth (1900–1930) | 1930 population |
|---|---|---|
| Beaumont | 512% | 57,732 |
| Houston | 555% | 292,352 |
| Dallas | 511% | 260,475 |
| Fort Worth | 504% | 163,447 |
| El Paso | 578% | 102,421 |

The major commercial centers in the state grew tremendously during this period. The city of Houston grew by 555% between 1900 and 1930, reaching a population of 292,352. Other cities, from Beaumont to El Paso, saw similar growth rates. By contrast, New York City grew by 101% and Detroit, where the automotive boom was occurring, grew by 485%.

The populations of many small Texas towns had even greater population increases when oil discoveries brought prospectors, investors, field laborers, and businessmen. Between 1920 and 1922, the town of Breckenridge in rural North Texas grew from about 1,500 people to nearly 30,000. Between 1925 and 1929, the town of Odessa in the Permian Basin grew from 750 to 5,000. Between 1924 and 1925, the town of Wortham in northern Texas grew from 1,000 to about 30,000. The town of Kilgore in eastern Texas grew from about 500 to 12,000 between 1930 and 1936 following the discovery of the East Texas field.

The growth for many towns was only temporary. Growth in some communities was often driven by exploitation of limited oil resources, so once wells ran dry or demand slowed, their populations rapidly declined. When Wortham's boom ended, the population crashed from its 1927 peak of 30,000 to 2,000 people in 1929. The population of Breckenridge dropped from a similar high to 7,569 in 1930. However, regions with large oil deposits saw sustained growth. Even by 1990, such counties still had a roughly 50% higher population density.

One of the most significant demographic changes in the state was the percentage of urban dwellers. Between 1910 and 1930, the percentage of urban dwellers (those living in towns of greater than 2500 people) increased by 32%, resulting in 41% of Texans living in urban areas in 1930. World War II pushed the urban population over 50%.

=== Urban development ===
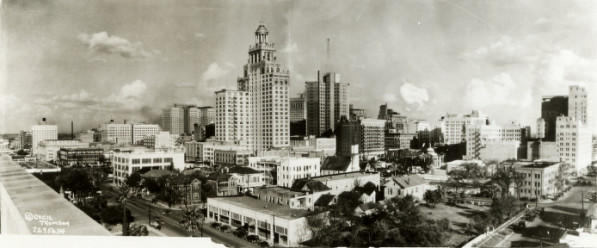
Downtown Houston in 1927

The urban landscape of the cities changed dramatically during this period. The Praetorian Building in Dallas (1907) and the Amicable Life Insurance Company building in Waco (1911) were among the first skyscrapers in Texas. The Perlstein Building in Beaumont was the first skyscraper built as a direct result of the boom. Beaumont's downtown grew rapidly during the first decade after the 1901 strike. After a second major strike at Spindletop in 1925, Beaumont had the largest skyline of any city between Houston and New Orleans by the end of the decade. The twenty–two-story Edson Hotel, completed in 1929, was the tallest hotel building in Texas for several years.

Despite Beaumont's importance during the early boom period, the nearby and already-established commercial center of Houston became the leading city of the period. Houston's status was boosted by the 1914 completion of the Houston Ship Channel, an artificially dredged conduit through the shallow Galveston Bay, allowing the Port of Houston to service large ships. Refineries and related operations were built along the Houston Ship Channel between Houston and Goose Creek. Heavy industry grew in the area and gradually created one of the world's largest industrial complexes. By the 1930s, Houston emerged as the state's largest city and the hub of the rail and road network. The effects of the petroleum-related growth helped offset the effects of the Great Depression substantially, particularly after the discovery of the East Texas field. Texans who became wealthy from the boom established upscale communities including Houston's River Oaks, which became a model for community planning in the U.S. Oil-related growth led to the creation of many new institutions, including the University of Houston, the Museum of Fine Arts, Hermann Park, the Houston Zoo, and the Houston Symphony Orchestra.

Dallas and Fort Worth experienced one of their greatest oil-related construction booms in 1930 and 1931, when the opening of the East Texas oil field helped establish Dallas as the financial center for the oil industry in Texas and Oklahoma. New business offices and municipal buildings appeared in the city, including the Highland Park Village shopping center, one of the nation's earliest shopping malls. The Depression slowed population growth in the Dallas area somewhat during the later 1930s, but rapid growth patterns returned again during the 1940s. By this time, though, Dallas had already begun to rediversify, becoming a center for aircraft manufacturing and electronics technology in addition to a variety of other industries.

=== Transportation ===
U.S. rankings of Texas ports (as of 2013)
| Port | Rank |
|---|---|
| Houston | 2nd |
| Beaumont | 4th |
| Corpus Christi | 8th |
| Port of Texas City | 14th |
| Port Arthur | 18th |
| Freeport | 31st |

Cheap gasoline encouraged automobile ownership, which provided a substantial revenue source to the government, leading to the rapid expansion of highway development. Despite the state's geographical size and its rural nature at the turn of the century, the state's road systems developed to a level comparable with the more established industrial areas of the United States.

The oil boom helped expansion of several Texas ports including four ports currently ranked as the top twenty busiest ports in the United States in terms of cargo tonnage. The Houston Ship Channel and Port of Houston became the state's busiest shipping resources and one of the top two in the nation. Although Houston took the lead, the oil boom benefited other areas. The Sabine–Neches Waterway, located in the Beaumont/Port Arthur area, saw growth as a result of the oil boom. The existing ship channel was deepened following the 1901 Spindletop discovery and has been deepened several times since then. That waterway serves two of the United States's ports ranked in the top twenty in terms of cargo tonnage, the Port of Beaumont and the Port of Port Arthur. As of December 2013, The Sabine–Neches Waterway is the third-busiest waterway in the United States in terms of tons of cargo behind the Port of South Louisiana and the Houston Ship Channel. The Sabine–Neches Waterway is also the top bulk crude oil importer, the top bulk liquid waterway, and is projected to become the largest LNG exporter in the United States. Other beneficiaries included the Port of Corpus Christi and the Port of Texas City. As oil discoveries brought about refinery construction at various sites along the coast, the principle cargo for most ports from cotton to petroleum products.

=== Education ===
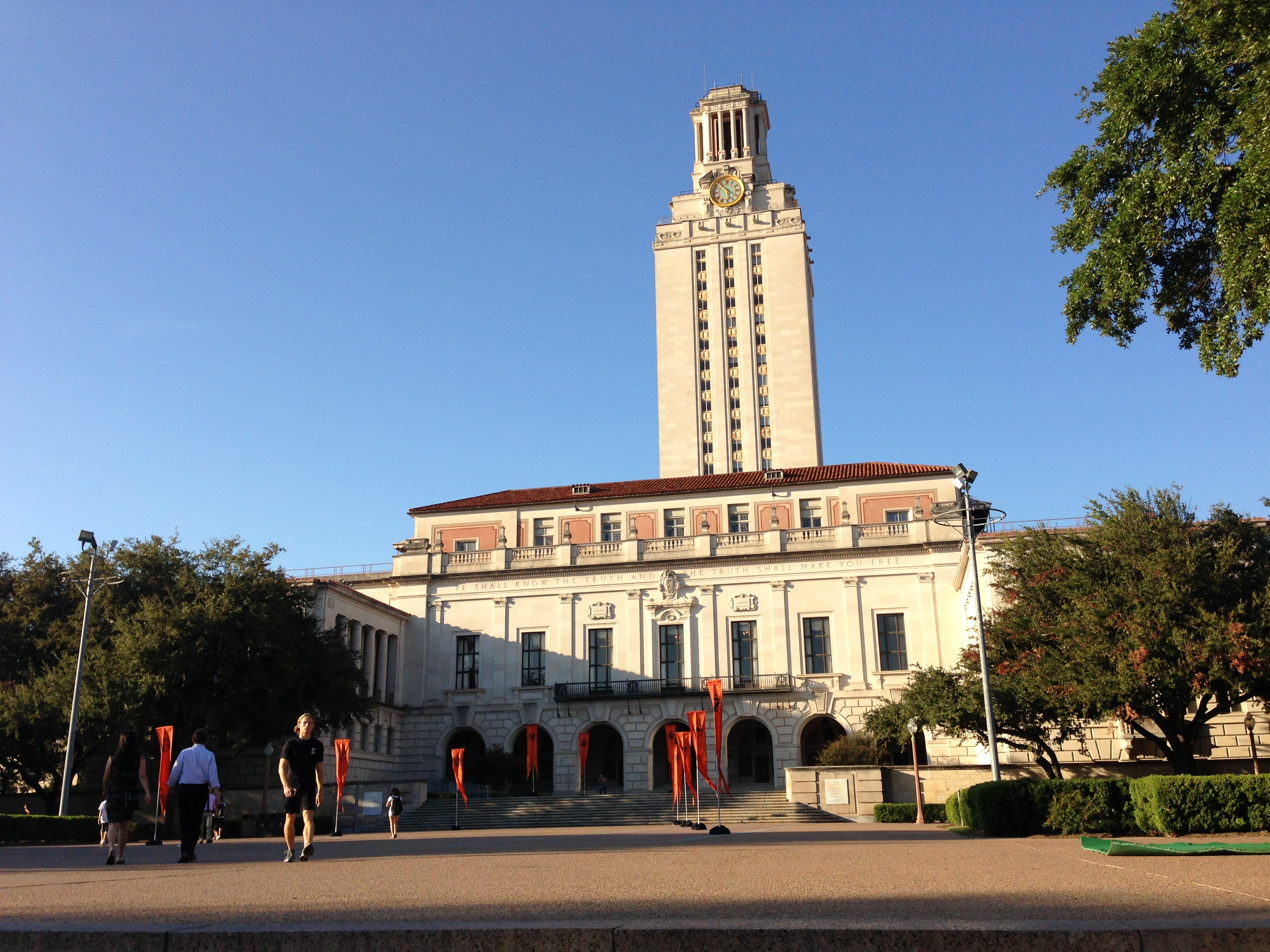
The main building of the University of Texas at Austin, built in part with oil revenues

The university system in Texas improved dramatically because of the boom. Before the boom, the University of Texas consisted of a small number of crude buildings near Austin. Oil speculation on university land in western Texas led to the creation of the Santa Rita oil well, giving the University of Texas, and later Texas A&M University, access to a major source of revenue and leading the university to become among the wealthiest in the United States. Other universities in the state, especially the University of Houston, were also able to benefit from state-owned oil production and donations from wealthy oil investors, fueling substantial growth and development in their campuses.

Primary and secondary education improved as well, though the extreme growth in the new boomtowns initially caused severe strain on school systems unprepared for the rapid influx of students. Even as money was rapidly flowing in the communities, obtaining tax revenue efficiently where it was needed was often complex. Communities dealt with these problems by establishing independent school districts, education districts formed independently of city or county government with their own independent taxing authority. This type of school district is still the standard in Texas today. In Texas and neighboring states, oil-rich counties participated more intensively in the Rosenwald School program and spent more public funds on matching grants for Rosenwald schools.

=== Government and politics ===
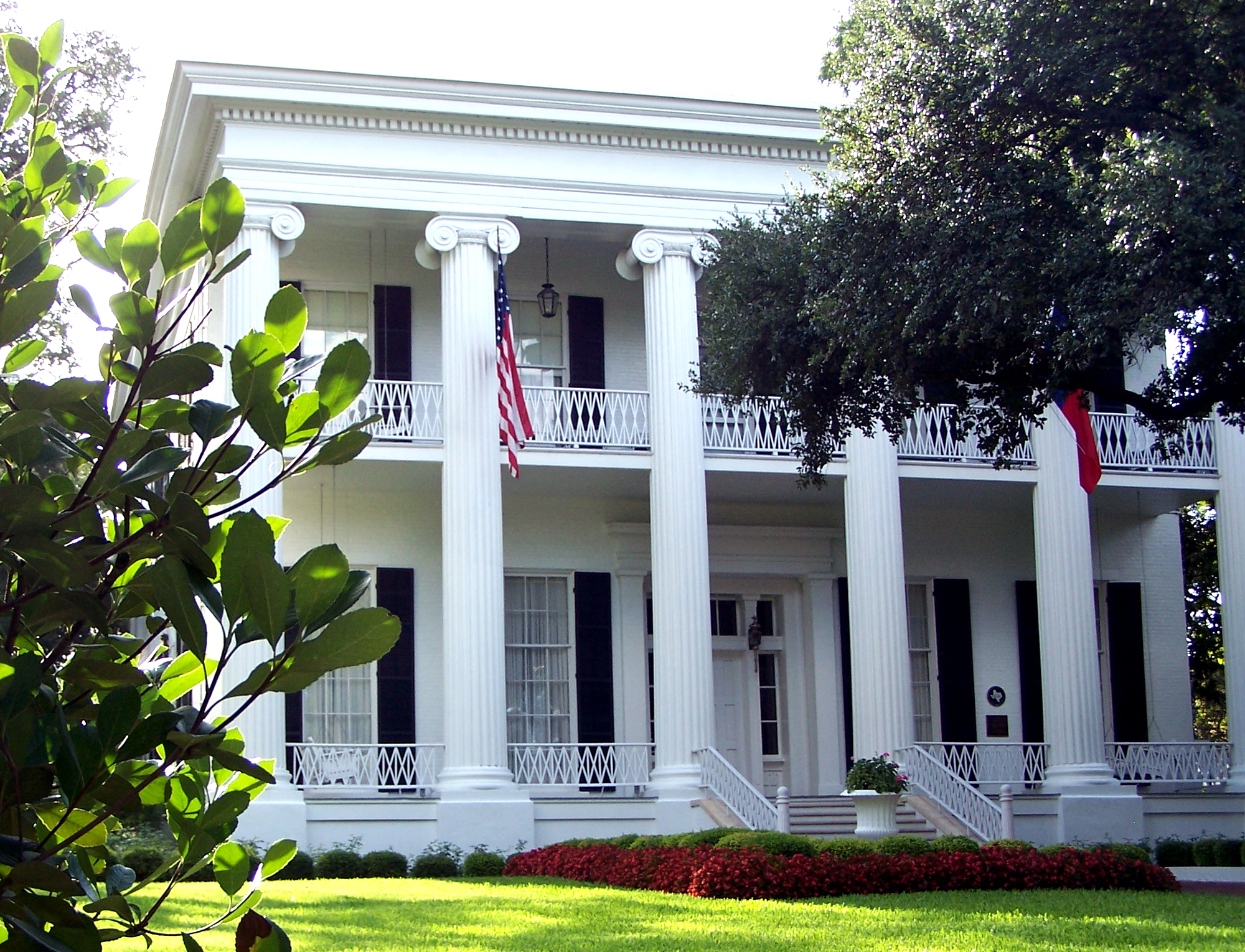
The Texas Governor's Mansion

One of the most significant developments in Texan government resulted from the creation of a state oil production tax in 1905. The revenue generated by the tax made funds available for development in the state without the need for income taxes and similar revenue mechanisms adopted in other states. In 1919, tax revenue from oil production surpassed $1 million ($18.6 million in today's terms) and in 1929 it reached $6 million ($113 million in today's terms). By 1940, the oil and gas industry accounted for approximately half of all taxes paid in the state.

Politics in Texas during the early 1900s was defined by a spirit of Progressivism. Oil money funded the expansion of the highway system and the educational system. In general, however, the attitude toward business was laissez-faire. There were few regulations on issues such as minimum wages and child labor.

The permissive attitude toward business did not always extend toward large corporations. A lack of venture capital in the state became a significant problem with the early industry. Civic and business leaders, and even ordinary citizens, worried that the influx of capital from outside the state would lead to a loss of political power, revenue, and business opportunities. This sentiment led to a series of antitrust lawsuits by the state Attorney General starting in 1906. The lawsuits easily succeeded and limited the ability of outside investors, most notably Standard Oil, to gain control of the state oil companies.

The mistrust of Standard Oil was partially the result of a suspicion toward carpetbaggers, which ironically was also the source of skepticism regarding labor unions. Union organizers were frequently seen as attempting to support a Northern agenda of promoting opportunities for African Americans at the expense of the white population. Because of the situation this created, labor reform was slow to develop. Despite the anti-union sentiments, groups like the International Oil Workers Union attracted membership and held some influence in the industry and state government.

=== Culture ===
As Texas in the 1960s emerged from the prospect of an empire into one of the nation's dozen "imperial states" ... the focus of Northern and national attention was on "change." By "change," most observers meant: When will Texans become more like the rest of the nation?

— Fehrenbach, T. R. (2000). Lone Star: A History of Texas and the Texans.

An enduring theme during and after the oil boom has been a reluctance among Texans to relinquish their identity and a stubbornness in maintaining their cultural heritage in the face of drastic changes to the state brought by the sudden wealth. Despite its growth and industrialization, Texas culture in the mid-20th century remained distinct from the other industrial centers of the nation.

The possibility of becoming wealthy from oil created a "wildcatter" culture, a reckless, entrepreneurial spirit, in many areas of the state. Independent entrepreneurs chased dreams of wealth by purchasing land and equipment to find oil. Ranchers and farmers, from both inside and outside of the state, turned to prospecting. The Oil and Gas Journal once published the following remark.

Though many failed in their endeavors there were many success stories. The majority of the pioneering of and searching for new oilfields in this era was done by these independents, not big business interests. Competition with large oil interests would lead to the establishment of the Independent Petroleum Association of Texas as a lobbying group for these small businessmen.

— Oil and Gas Journal

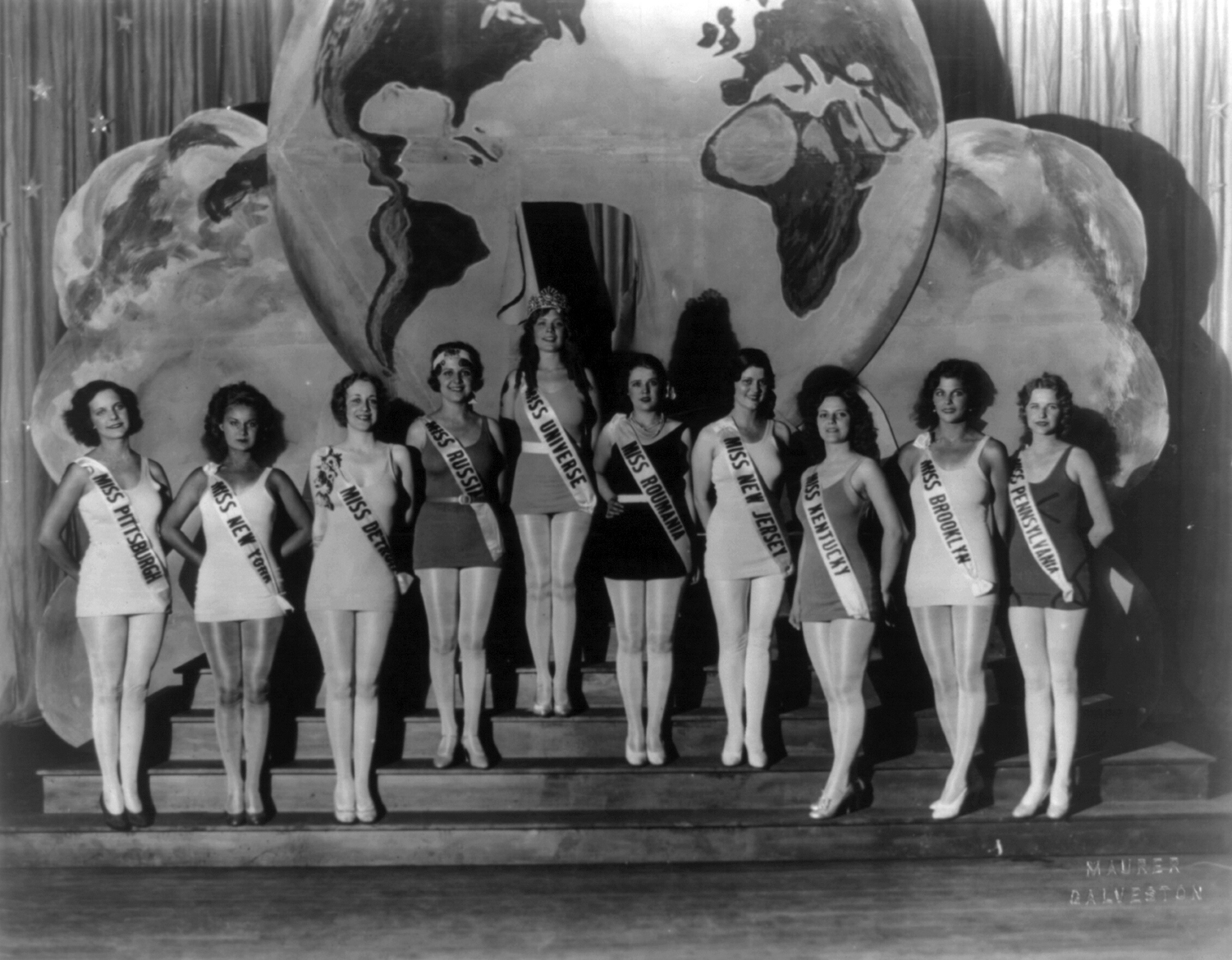
Winner and finalists of the 1930 Miss Universe contest in Galveston

Houston pioneered American car culture in the early 1900s thanks to the ready availability of inexpensive gasoline. By the 1920s traffic congestion had become so serious that the city became the first in the nation to install interconnected traffic lights. Visitors to the city were often astonished at the lack of pedestrian access to shopping venues and the importance of the automobile within the city. Though mass transit had been successful in Houston's earlier years, later efforts aimed at promoting mass transit and urban planning were largely defeated in Houston because of opposition by the public, which favored public investment in roads over mass transit. Urban concepts pioneered in Houston, like establishing shopping centers outside the city's core and encouraging suburban sprawl, became major trends adopted in many cities, both within the state and around the country.

Another indirect effect of the boom was the growth of gambling and prostitution in many communities. These activities had not been uncommon in Texas before the boom, but the wealth brought by the oil industry, as well as difficulties in enhancing the laws and the law enforcement agencies, created many new opportunities for illegal businesses and organized crime. Many communities developed casino and red-light districts; notably the gaming empire in Galveston, which attracted wealthy businessmen from Houston and lasted into the 1950s, was the longest lasting of all of these. Prostitution, which had always been present in the state, flourished in the boom towns, which were crowded with single men earning relatively high wages. The onset of Prohibition and the state government's reluctance to enforce vice laws only encouraged the growth of gambling and bootlegging during this period.

The rapid social changes during this period, especially the 1920s, led to the reemergence of the Ku Klux Klan in the urban centers of Texas, with their strongest presence in Dallas. As in other states, the new Klan was not outwardly focused on suppression of black civil rights, but instead supported traditional morality including opposition to bootlegging, gambling, and other vices that had grown during the period. Bigotry, though, was never far from the group's agenda. During the Depression, anti-New Deal sentiments among some leaders, such as John Kirby, led to their becoming loosely associated with the Klan and its ideals.

The petroleum industry influenced long-term trends in Texas and American culture. Conservative views among the early business leaders in Texas led them to help finance the emergence of the modern Christian right and the American conservative movement.

=== Environment ===
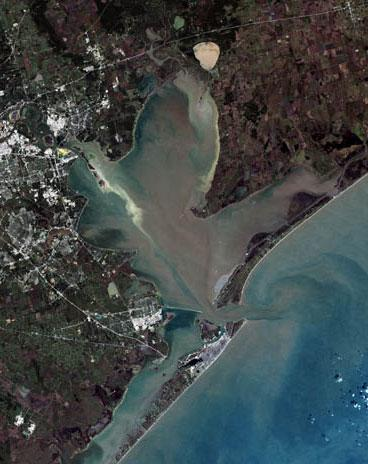
False-color satellite photograph of Galveston Bay

Although from the outset of the oil boom there were efforts at conservation and protection of the environment, they generally enjoyed little success. Because of the ease of finding oil in the early decades, wells were often not fully developed before prospectors began looking for more productive wells. The wildcatters not only wasted the valuable resource, but created avoidable environmental contamination with the numerous oil strikes. The rush to extract oil frequently led to the construction of poor storage facilities where leaks were common and water pollution became a serious issue. Parallel to this, the clearing of fields for oil exploration and the demand for lumber to be used in new construction, all of which followed major logging activities in the 19th century, destroyed most of the once dense forest lands in the state. Later environmental management efforts helped restore some of the forest lands but they remain a shadow of what they were before statehood.

Industrial activities, which had little regulation, created substantial air pollution. The practice of burning off gas pockets in new oil fields was common, thus increasing the problem. As the Houston area came to be the most heavily industrialized area in the state, it accumulated the most serious air quality issues. By the 1950s, airline pilots were able to use lines of haze in the air to navigate into the city. Though air quality in urban areas has since improved, as of 2015 Texas remains the leading producer of greenhouse gases in the United States, though per capita Texas ranks as the 14th worst. Additionally as of 2017 NASA ranks Houston as having the worst air quality in the nation (though other sources rank the city somewhat better).

Another serious effect created by the oil-related industries has been the pollution around the Houston Ship Channel and in Galveston Bay. By the 1970s, these waterways were among the most polluted waters in the United States. Though industrial sources were major sources of pollution, urbanization around the bay also contributed significantly to pollution levels. In recent decades, most of the pollution in the bay is the result of storm run-off from various smaller commercial, agricultural, and residential sources, as opposed to the major industrial complexes. Conservation efforts in the mid to late 20th century by area industries and municipalities have helped to dramatically improve water quality in the bay reversing at least some of the earlier damage to the ecosystem.

=== After the gushers ===
By the 1940s, production in the East Texas Oil Field and oil prices stabilized. Though the major urban areas continued to grow, the extreme growth patterns of the first three decades began to slow. As western Texas and the panhandle region began to be more fully explored, the Permian Basin gradually became the top producing area of the state. Though independent oil companies were still an important part of the industry for some time, the major new strikes were increasingly made by established companies. World War II helped complete the state's transition to an industrialized and urbanized state with oil facilitating the transition.

During the 1960s and 1970s, as a result of both production peaks in some nations and political instability in others, the world's supply of petroleum tightened leading to an energy crisis during the 1970s and early 1980s. Petroleum prices rose dramatically, greatly benefiting Texas, particularly as compared to other parts of the U.S. that faced recession during this time. A new economic boom emerged which, though not as transformative as the early 1900s, pushed the population of Texas to the point that, by the end of the century, Texas was the second most populous state in the nation. Some sources, in fact, use the phrase Texas oil boom to refer to this later period rather than the earlier period that followed Spindletop.

== Iconic figures of the era ==
=== The big four ===
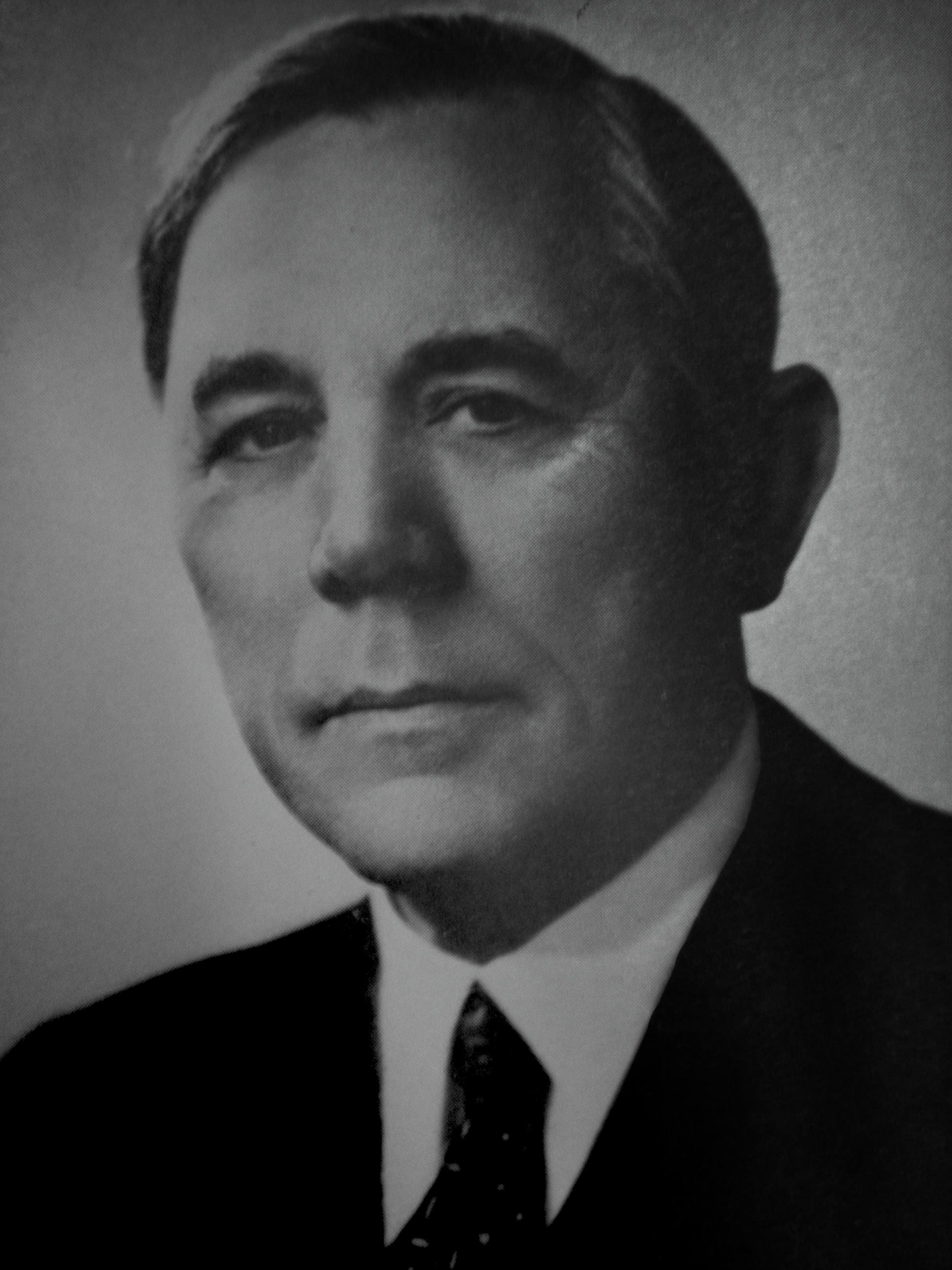
H. Roy Cullen, industrialist and philanthropist, considered one of the key figures in the early Texas oil industry

Four businessmen were emblematic of the 1920s and 30s boom years – H. Roy Cullen, H. L. Hunt, Sid W. Richardson, and Clint Murchison. Cullen was a self-educated cotton and real-estate businessman who moved to Houston in 1918 and soon began oil prospecting. Cullen's success led to his founding the South Texas Petroleum Company (with partner Jim West Sr.) and Quintana Oil Company. Cullen and his wife established the Cullen Foundation, which became one of the largest charitable organizations in the state, and donated heavily to the University of Houston, the Texas Medical Center, and numerous other causes in Texas, particularly in the Houston area.

Hunt's first successes were in the oilfields of Arkansas, but he lost most of his fortune by the outset of the Depression as overproduction depleted his fields and his speculation on land and oil drained his resources. He joined in Columbus Joiner's venture which opened the East Texas Oil Field. Hunt bought most of Joiner's interests in eastern Texas and his company, Placid Oil, owned hundreds of wells. He became established in Dallas and was labeled the richest man in the nation in 1948 by Fortune Magazine. A scandal emerged in 1975, after his death, when it was discovered that he had had a hidden bigamous relationship, with his second wife living in New York.

Richardson was a cattle trader who established an independent oil production business in Fort Worth in 1919. He soon expanded into numerous businesses and owned the Texas City Refining Company, cattle ranches, radio and television networks, among other businesses. He was a very private man who was sometimes referred to as the "bachelor billionaire." Murchison, who began his career at his father's bank, soon became an oil lease trader working with Richardson. He expanded into exploration and production in northern Texas, then around San Antonio, and finally the Dallas area. He went on to create the Southern Union Gas Company and became a developer on the East Texas field. He expanded his business into international oil and gas operations in Canada and Australia. His son Clint Jr. went on to form the Dallas Cowboys football franchise. For their part, Murchison and Richardson were known to have been major national political operatives and had close ties to President Dwight D. Eisenhower and his vice president Richard M. Nixon, as well as FBI chief J. Edgar Hoover and President Lyndon B. Johnson.

=== Other icons ===
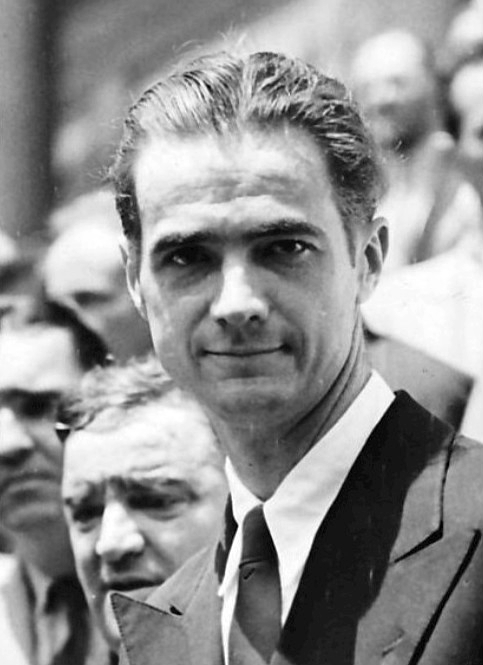
Howard Hughes, famed aviator, film producer, and business magnate

Other wealthy Texans involved in the oil industry, though not as influential, became well known, often as much for their eccentricities as their wealth. Howard Hughes, son of Howard R. Hughes Sr. (a Houston business magnate who invented a key drill-bit technology during the early days of the boom period), became a nationally known figure for his success in the aviation and film industries. He became equally famous for his eccentricities and later mental decline, as well as his eventual heavy investments in Las Vegas gambling establishments.

Glenn McCarthy was a modest oil worker who pioneered wells around what the Houston area. In 1932, he struck oil at Anahuac near the Galveston Bay. Over the next decade, he made dozens of other strikes and quickly became one of Texas' richest men. His extravagance was legendary leading to his becoming $52 million in debt in 1952 ($630 million in present-day terms). His love of bourbon led him to establish the WildCatter bourbon label. His excesses made him an unwilling national celebrity during the 1940s and 1950s as the media became enamored with tales of Texas oil wealth.

Jim West Jr. was the heir to the fortune of Jim West Sr., an early Houston businessman who helped shape the city and the state before the boom and during the early years of the boom. Known as "Silver Dollar Jim", for his habit of carrying silver dollars and tossing them to doormen, the poor, and anyone that waited on him, West Jr. is regarded by many as the most flamboyant of Houston oilmen. His lavish spending habits and his proclivity for amateur law enforcement were well known. Using his many cars, which were kept loaded with weapons, sirens, and radios, he regularly chased criminals in Houston alongside the police.

== In popular culture ==
Though the general public of the United States was aware of oil production in Texas, the wealth that it generated in the state for the first three decades after Spindletop was largely unknown. Of the four most prominent oil businessmen in Texas at the end of World War II — Murchison, Cullen, Richardson, and Hunt — only three articles about them appeared in the New York Times during their lifetime, despite their philanthropy and influence in Washington D.C. Stereotypes about Texas in the American imagination generally revolved around cowboys and cattle.

By the late 1940s, the national media began to report the extreme wealth of some Texans in magazines such as Life and Fortune. A stereotype emerged of the nouveau-riche Texas oil millionaire, popularized by the media. The popular image was often characterized by a rough and combative personality, heavy drinking, and extravagant spending. In 1956, the motion picture Giant helped to crystallize the image of Texans in the popular imagination as comical, eccentric figures. Glenn McCarthy was the inspiration for the character of Jett Rink in the film. Other films such as Boom Town and War of the Wildcats, and books such as The Lusty Texans of Dallas and Houston: Land of the Big Rich, also contributed to public perceptions of oil's influence in Texas and surrounding states.

== See also ==
- Energy in the United States
- Energy in Texas
- History of the petroleum industry in the United States
- History of petroleum
- Hydrocarbon exploration
- List of oil fields
- Midland, Texas
- Odessa, Texas
- Oil and gas law in the United States
- Oil in Texas
- Oil reserves in the United States
- United States oil politics
- Howard R. Hughes Sr.
- Other similar events in North American history:

- California Gold Rush
- Indiana Gas Boom
- Mexican oil boom
- Ohio Oil Rush
- Pennsylvanian oil rush
