= Edson Hotel =

Building in Beaumont, Texas

- U.S. Historic district – Contributing property
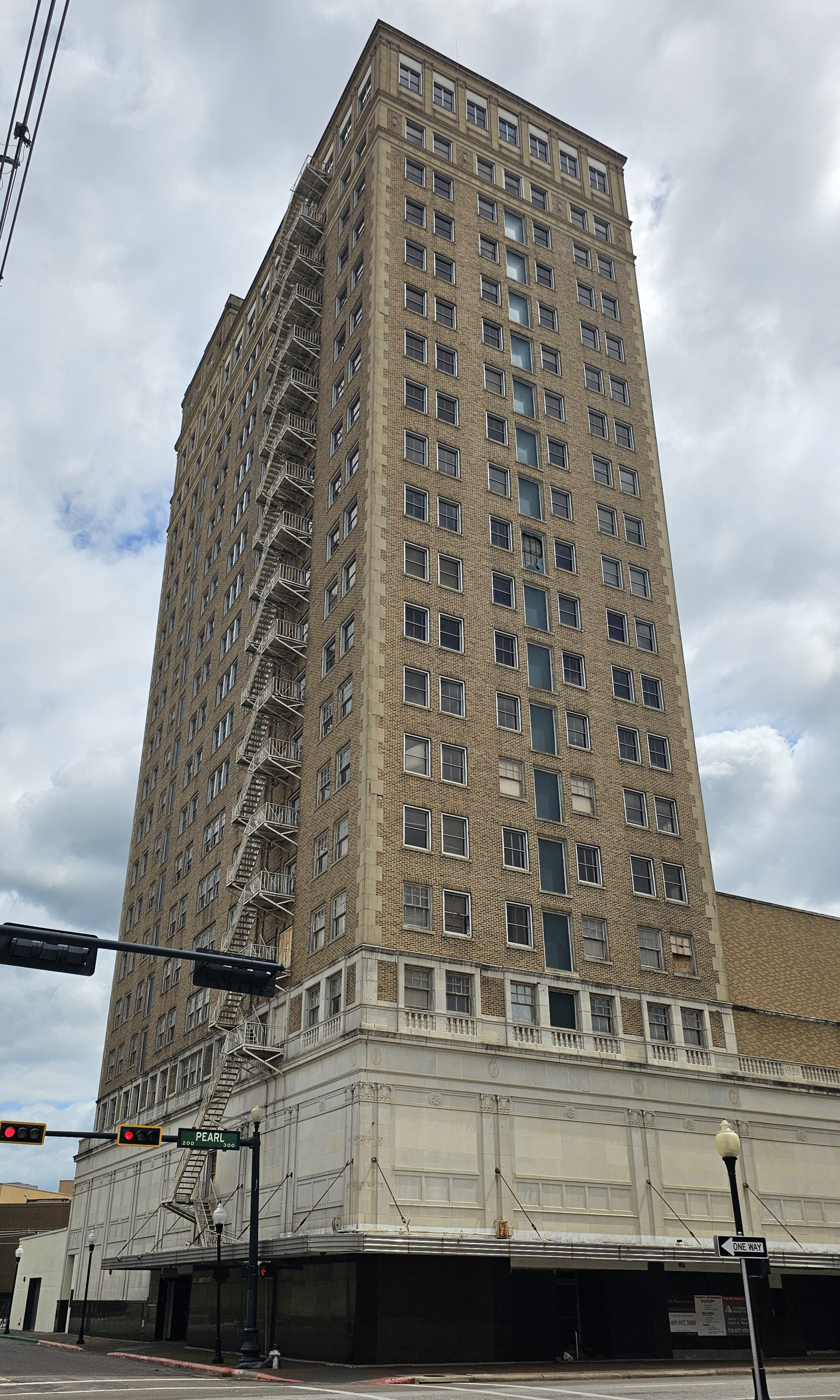
- The building in 2024

- Location within Texas Location within the United States
- Location: 301 Pearl St., Beaumont, Texas
- Coordinates: 30°5′5.4″N 94°5′58.1″W
- Area: less than one acre
- Built: 1928-1929
- Architect: F.W. Steinman, Douglas E. Steinman
- Architectural style: Classical Revival
- Part of: Beaumont Commercial District (ID78002959)
- Designated CP: April 14, 1978

The Edson Hotel in Beaumont, Texas was built in 1929 at a cost of $1.5 Million, and was designed by F.W. and D.E. Steinman of Beaumont. The building is 22 stories tall. The building was bought in 1955 by Gulf States Utilities, and has been an office building ever since.

Edson Hotel
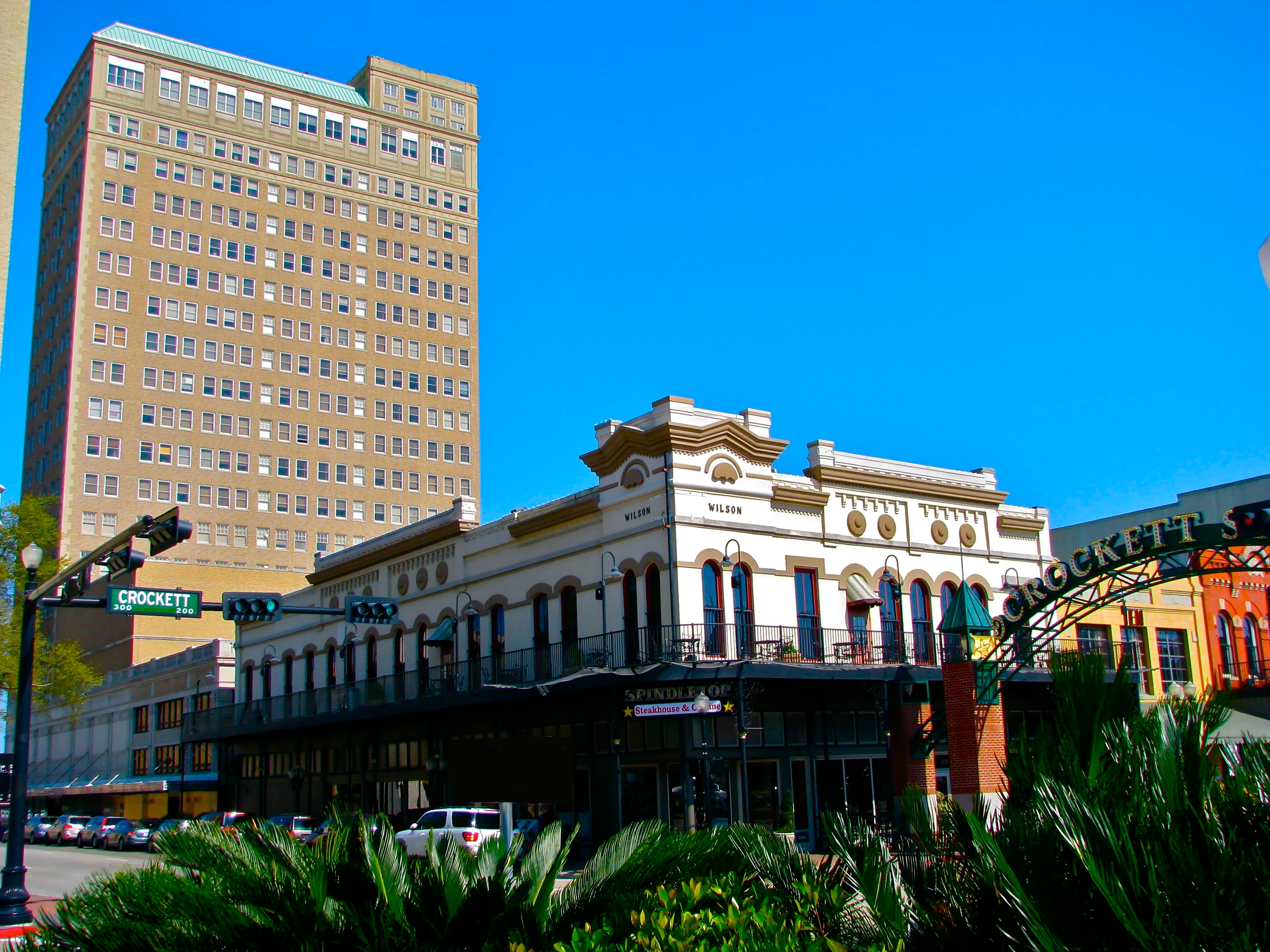
Edson Hotel in the background, Crockett Street in the foreground

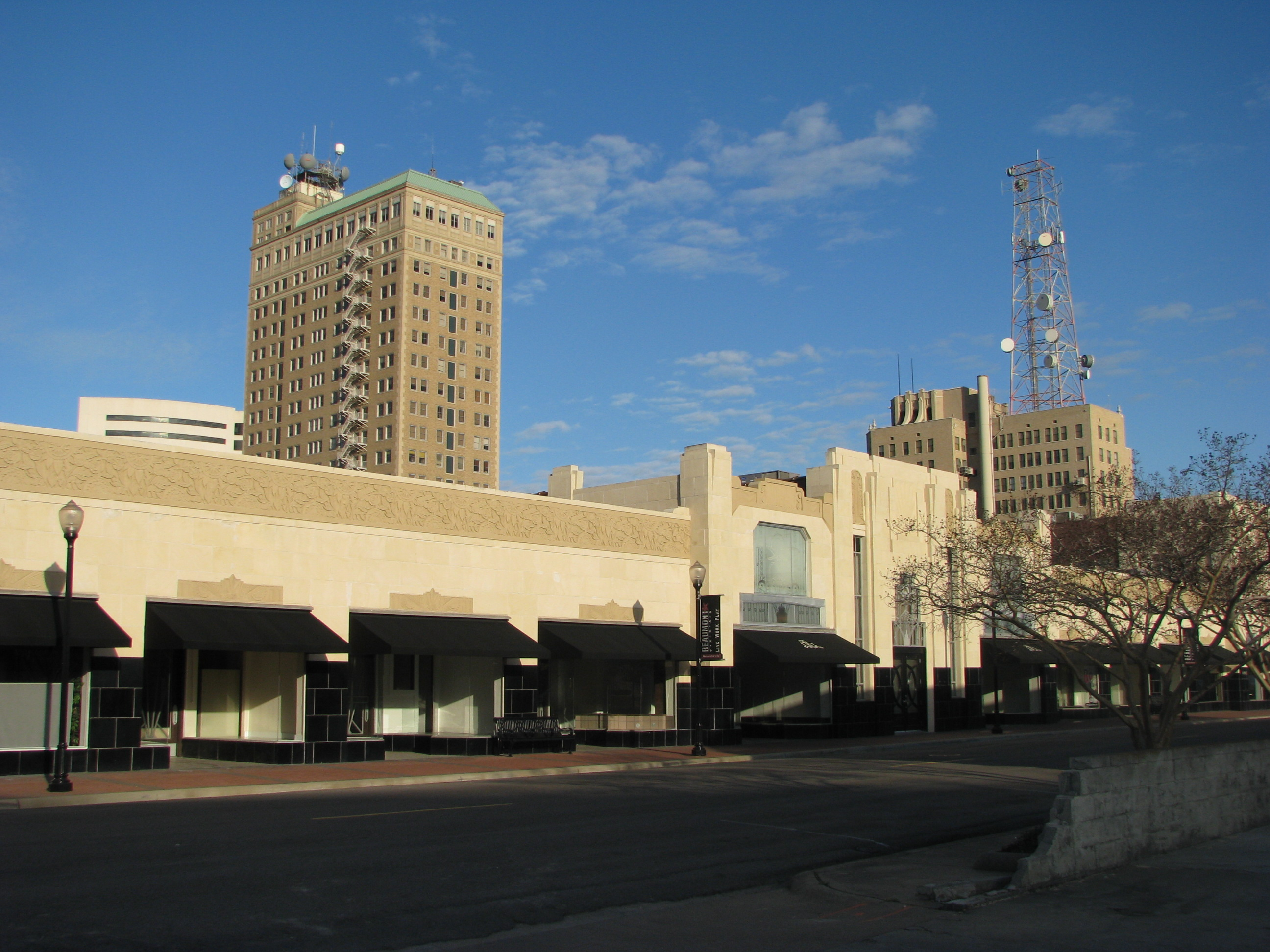
Kyle Building in the foreground, Edson Hotel in the background

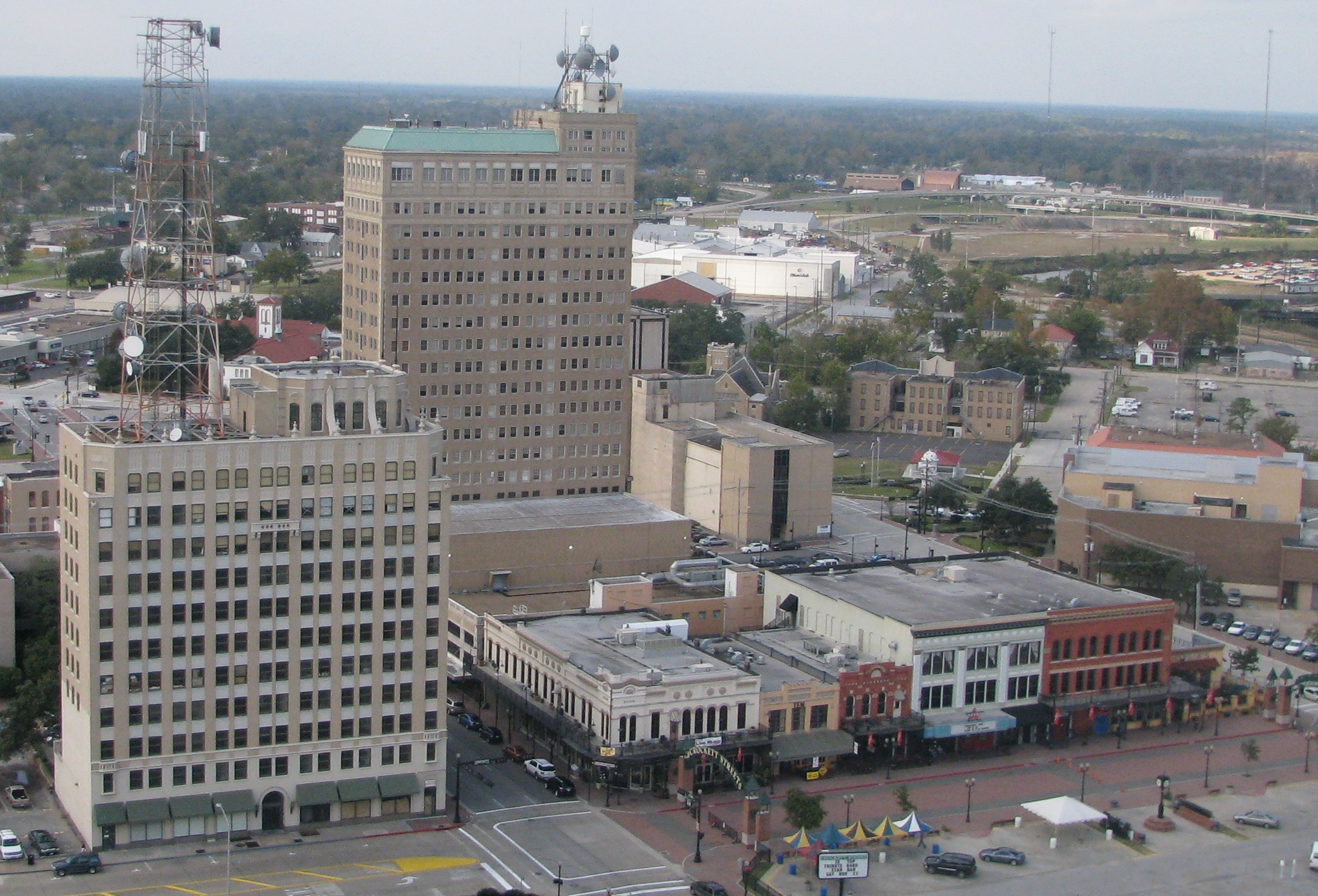
Left to right: Goodhue Building, Edson Hotel, Crockett Street

== See also ==
- National Register of Historic Places listings in Jefferson County, Texas
