= Anthony Francis Lucas =

Croatian-born American oil explorer (1855–1921)

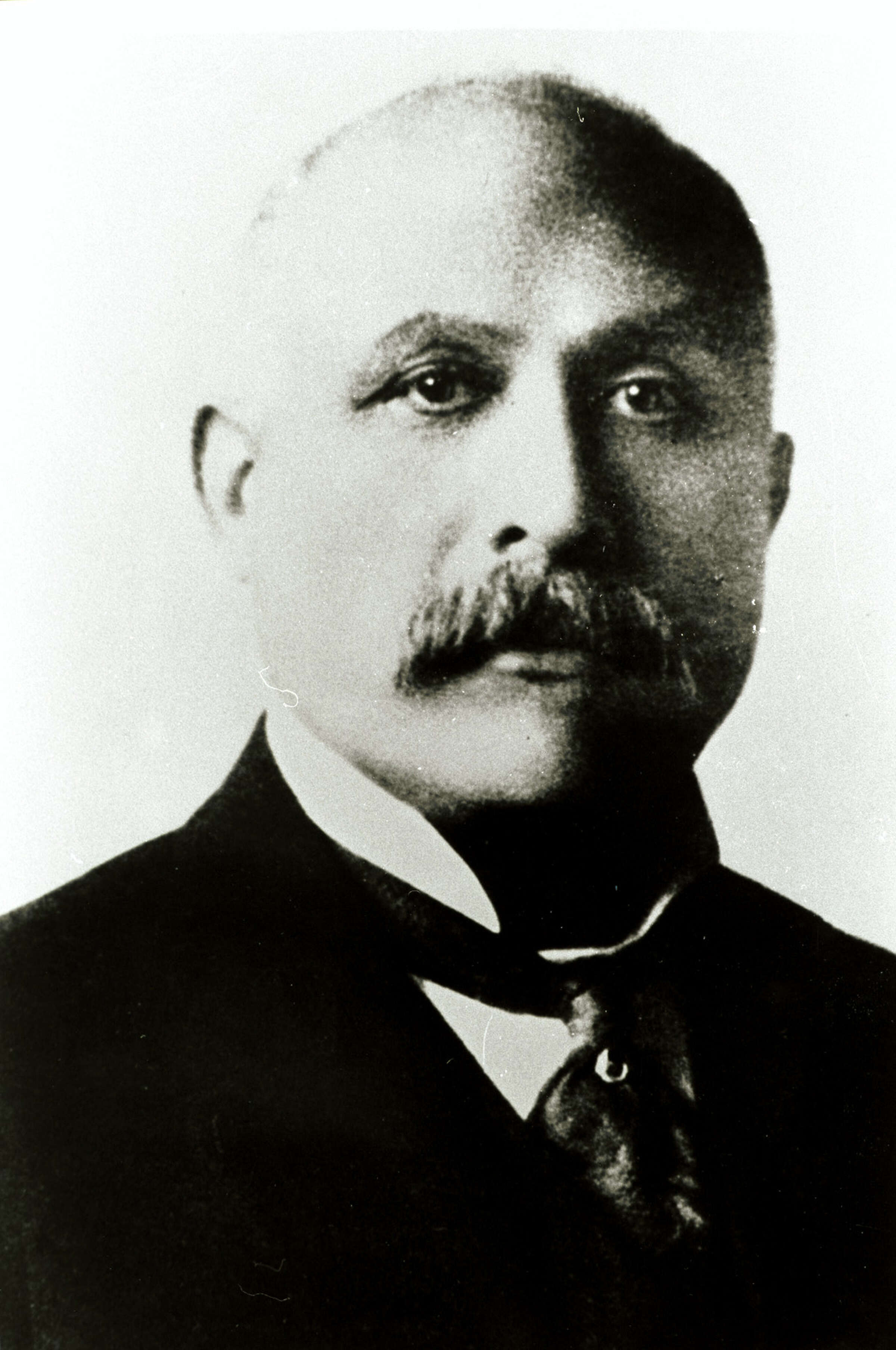
- Anthony Francis Lucas
- Born: September 9, 1855; Split, Kingdom of Dalmatia, Austrian Empire
- Died: September 2, 1921 (aged 65); Washington, D.C., U.S.
- Resting place: Rock Creek Cemetery; Washington, D.C., U.S.
- Scientific career
- Fields: Mechanical engineering

Anthony Francis Lucas (born Antun Lučić; September 9, 1855 – September 2, 1921) was a Croatian-born American oil explorer. With Pattillo Higgins, he organized the drilling of an oil well near Beaumont, Texas, that became known as Spindletop. This led to the widespread exploitation of oil and the start of the Petroleum Age.

== Early life ==
Christened Antonio Francesco Luchich, he was the son of Captain Francis Stephen Luchich, a prosperous shipbuilder and shipowner from the Croatian island of Lesina, and his wife Giovanna Giovanizio. According to Lucas himself, who was proud of his heritage, the Luchich family was pure by blood, descended from ancient Illyrian (Dalmatian) nobility, and he sometimes called himself in society events "Count Anthony [François Maria Vincent] Giovanizio de Bertuchevich Lucas". Born in the Austrian Empire city of Split, his family moved to Trieste, where his father served in the Austro-Hungarian navy.

At the age of 20, Lucas completed studies at the Polytechnical Institute (Technische Hochschule) in Graz, and became an engineer. After graduating from the Imperial and Royal Naval Academy of Pola and Fiume, Lucas was commissioned a second lieutenant in 1878.

== Move to the United States ==
In 1879, Lucas visited his uncle in Saginaw, Michigan, and started work in a sawmill, improving the design of a gang saw then in use. In 1883, he started working in the Colorado, California and North Carolina gold, copper, silver and iron mining industries. He changed his name to Anthony Francis Lucas, receiving his naturalization papers on May 9, 1885, at Norfolk, Virginia. He married Caroline Weed Fitzgerald in 1887. They moved to Washington, D.C. in 1888, where Lucas worked as a mechanical and mining engineer, except for a two-year break prospecting for gold in Colorado. Their son Anthony FitzGerald was born on 21 July 1889.

== Career ==
In 1893, Lucas started to work as a salt mine superintendent for Myles and Company of New Orleans. The damaged mine was located at Petite Anse (Avery Island), and over the next three years, Lucas restored operations.

Lucas drilled and explored for salt on Jefferson Island for Joseph Jefferson, and Belle Isle, where he discovered the relationship between salt deposits, sulfur, natural gas, and oil deposits. In Lucas' words, "This led me to study the accumulation of oil around salt masses, and I formed additional plans for prospecting other localities. Thus I began my investigations into the occurrence of oil on the Coastal Plain." In 1898, Lucas mined salt on Grand Côte, Weeks Island, and Anse la Butte, having by then become an expert on salt domes.

=== Lucas Gusher ===
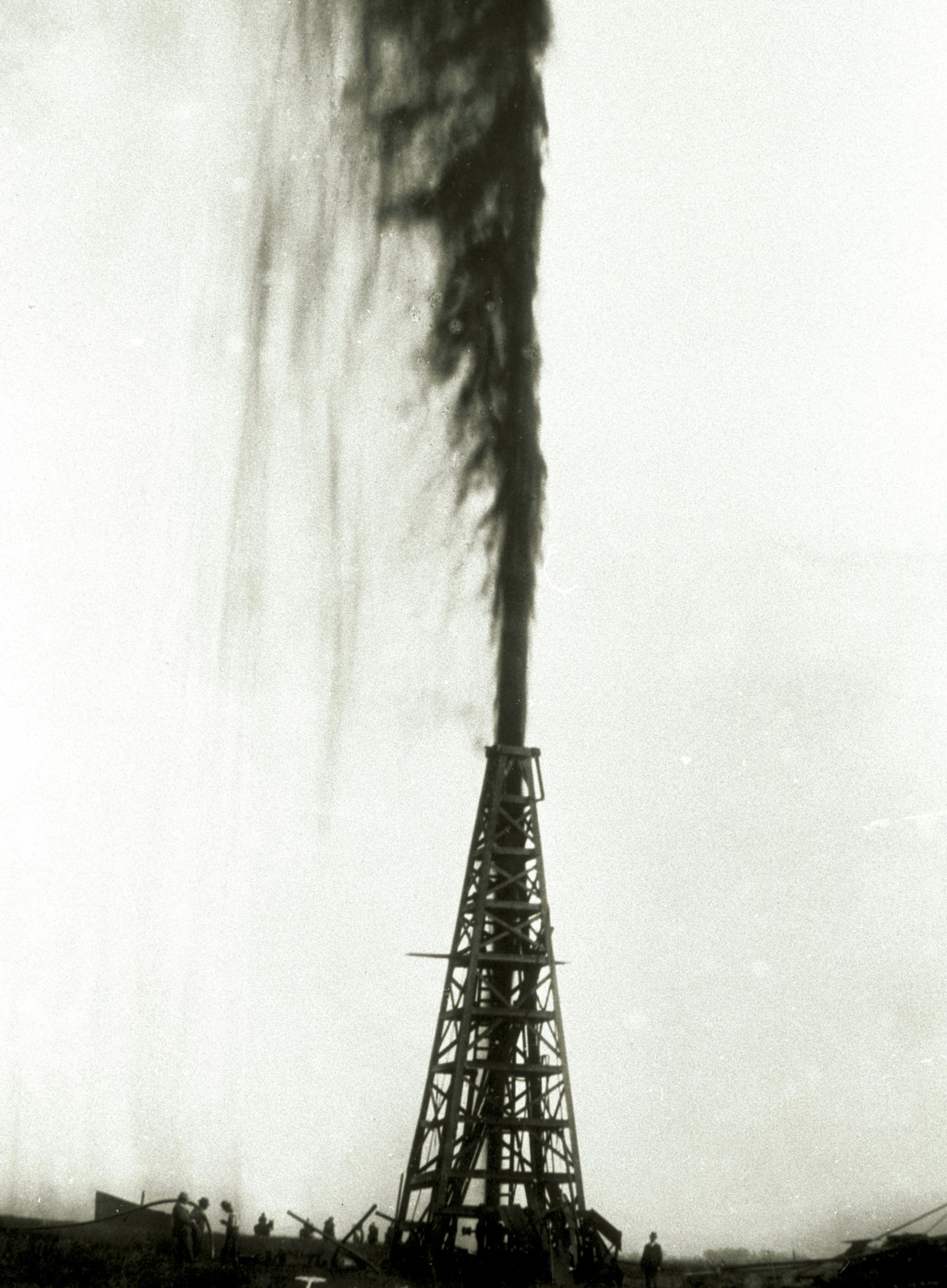
The Lucas Gusher at Spindletop. January 10, 1901

In 1899, Lucas visited the Sour Spring Mound south of Beaumont, Texas, with Pattillo Higgins. This was the future site of Spindletop. Lucas noted, "This mound attracted my attention on account of the contour, which indicated possibilities for an incipient dome below, and because at the apex of it there were exudations of sulphuretted hydrogen gas. This has suggested to me, in the light of my experience at Belle Isle, that it might prove a source of either sulphur or oil, or both." Lucas then signed a lease agreement with the Gladys City Oil, Gas, and Manufacturing Company, and a separate agreement with Higgins.

Using a rotary drilling rig from Louisiana, Lucas began his well in August or September 1899, reaching a depth of 250 feet (76 m) in Dec. At a depth of 575 feet (175 m), the casing collapsed, but only after a layer of oil sand was found.

Short on money, Lucas sought funding from any source, including Henry Folger of Standard Oil, but to no avail. Lucas received an opportunity when Dr. William Battle Phillips, geologist for the University of Texas and the Texas State Mineral Survey, endorsed Lucas' dome theory, and wrote a letter of introduction to John H. Galey. Galey, with his partner James M. Guffey, put together financing with Andrew Mellon, allowing Lucas to drill three wells 1,200 feet (370 m) deep. Lucas also retained 12.5 percent of the deal. Galey further recommended that the Hamill brothers, Al, Curt, and Jim, drill the well.

After reaching the depth of 1,139 feet (347 m), on 10 January 1901, mud and water erupted followed by a stream of crude oil reaching 150 feet (46 m). The eruption lasted nine days, flowing between 70,000 and 100,000 barrels per day, before the Lucas Gusher was finally brought under control.

Beaumont became a boomtown. Yet, tiring of his loss of privacy, in May 1901, Lucas sold his stock in the Guffey Petroleum Company, and continued his scientific search for oil in the United States and Mexico.

== Legacy ==
The Lucas Gusher helped revolutionize world fuel use and transformed the economy of southeast Texas. It helped further the development of the combustion engine automobile since significant amounts of energy were needed for fuel. The city of Houston become the national center of the oil industry, with the United States surpassing Russia as the world's leading producer.

Anthony Francis Lucas is considered to be the founder of modern petroleum reservoir engineering. He later served as a consulting engineer in Romania, Russia, Mexico, Algeria, as well as in the United States. As a successful businessman and expert in mining, Lucas was the lifelong chairman of the American Committee for Oil and Gas.

== Inventions and applications ==
A number of Lucas inventions and scientific or technical knowledge were used in early oil exploration and extraction, with most still being employed. Some are:

- overhead method of mining in salt mines
- surface exploration for underground mineral deposits
- application of steam-driven, hydraulic-rotary drilling rig and of mud in oil well drilling
- construction and application of back pressure valve
- construction of blowout preventers
- designing of well logs
- invention of the Christmas tree oil well

== Heritage ==
Lucas died on September 2, 1921, in Washington, D.C. He was often mistakenly described as Austrian, sometimes even as a Trieste-born Italian. On his grave in Rock Creek Cemetery in Washington, D.C., he is described as being of Illyric origin, which was the standard term for Croatian at the time.

In 1936, the American Institute for Geological and Metallurgical Investigations founded the Anthony F. Lucas Gold Medal for development in the area of oil exploration. A museum with a granite obelisk was built to honor the explorer about which is inscribed: "On this spot on the tenth day of the twentieth century a new era in civilization began." A street and an elementary school in Beaumont, Texas, bear his name.
