= National Register of Historic Places listings in outer Harris County, Texas =

This is a list of the National Register of Historic Places in outer Harris County, Texas. It is intended to be a complete list of properties and districts listed on the National Register of Historic Places in the outer portion of Harris County, Texas, United States, defined as outside the I-610 loop. The locations of National Register properties and districts (at least for all showing latitude and longitude coordinates below) may be seen in a map by clicking on "Map of all coordinates."

Included is a cluster of seven current listings in the historic black neighborhood of Independence Heights, Houston. Another cluster of three listings are NASA structures at the Lyndon B. Johnson Space Center.

Contents: NRHP listings by area in Harris County
downtown Houston - Houston Heights - inner Harris County - outer Harris County

This National Park Service list is complete through NPS recent listings posted April 24, 2026.

== Current listings ==
	Name on the Register	Image	Date listed	Location	City or town	Description
1	Apollo Mission Control Center	Apollo Mission Control Center	October 3, 1985 (#85002815)	Lyndon B. Johnson Space Flight Center; 29°33′29″N 95°05′18″W	Houston	
2	Armand Bayou Archeological District	Armand Bayou Archeological District	December 12, 1978 (#78002952)	Address Restricted	Pasadena	
3	Barker-Cypress Archeological Site (41HR436)		April 24, 1984 (#84001753)	Address Restricted	Houston	
4	Cedar Bayou Archeological District		March 2, 1979 (#79002952)	Address Restricted	Baytown	
5	Ben C. and Jenetter Cyrus House	Ben C. and Jenetter Cyrus House	June 4, 1997 (#97000549)	325 E. 25th St. 29°49′05″N 95°23′33″W	Houston	
6	Harris County Boys School Site	Harris County Boys School Site	May 2, 1979 (#79002961)	Address Restricted	Houston	It is an archeological site with middens and burials.
7	Houston Municipal Airport Terminal	Houston Municipal Airport Terminal	March 6, 2019 (#100003488)	8325 Travelair Rd. 29°38′49″N 95°17′10″W	Houston	
8	Houston National Cemetery	Houston National Cemetery	February 28, 2017 (#100000697)	10410 Veterans Memorial Dr. 29°55′51″N 95°27′02″W	Houston	
9	Independence Heights Residential Historic District	Independence Heights Residential Historic District	June 4, 1997 (#97000542)	Roughly bounded by N. Yale and E. 34th Sts., and I-610; 29°48′54″N 95°23′45″W	Houston	Independence Heights
10	Independence Park	Independence Park	June 4, 1997 (#97000544)	Roughly bounded by 1000 Blk. of E. 40th St. 29°49′21″N 95°23′11″W	Houston	
11	Charles Johnson House	Charles Johnson House	June 4, 1997 (#97000550)	301 E. 35th St. 29°49′05″N 95°23′45″W	Houston	Independence Heights
12	K'nesseth Israel Synagogue		February 12, 2024 (#100009949)	100 West Sterling Avenue; 29°44′02″N 94°58′06″W	Baytown	
13	Ella Lewis Store and Rental Houses	Ella Lewis Store and Rental Houses	June 4, 1997 (#97000543)	3404-3406-3408 Cortlandt St. 29°49′02″N 95°23′44″W	Houston	Independence Heights
14	Oscar Lindsay House	Oscar Lindsay House	June 4, 1997 (#97000546)	7415 N. Main St. 29°49′02″N 95°23′34″W	Houston	Independence Heights
15	William Mackey House		June 4, 1997 (#97000547)	313 E. 37th St. 29°49′12″N 95°23′43″W	Houston	Independence Heights
16	Mansfield Street Archeological Site		May 22, 1978 (#78002945)	Address Restricted	Houston	
17	Morgan's Point Historic District	Morgan's Point Historic District	September 30, 1994 (#94001160)	89-835 Bayridge Rd. and 300-322 Vinsonia; 29°40′13″N 94°59′39″W	Morgan's Point	
18	Pasadena Post Office		March 16, 2022 (#100007523)	102 Munger St. 29°42′44″N 95°12′39″W	Pasadena	
19	Pomeroy Homestead		May 1, 2003 (#03000329)	202 and 204 S. Main St. 29°42′38″N 95°12′35″W	Pasadena	
20	San Jacinto Battlefield	San Jacinto Battlefield	October 15, 1966 (#66000815)	22 mi (35 km). E of Houston on TX 134; 29°44′56″N 95°04′49″W	Houston	
21	Saturn V Launch Vehicle	Saturn V Launch Vehicle	February 4, 2003 (#02001731)	Johnson Space Center; 29°33′26″N 95°05′20″W	Houston	
22	Space Environment Simulation Laboratory	Space Environment Simulation Laboratory	October 3, 1985 (#85002810)	Lyndon B. Johnson Space Center; 29°33′38″N 95°05′17″W	Houston	
23	State Highway 35 Bridge at the West Fork of the San Jacinto River	State Highway 35 Bridge at the West Fork of the San Jacinto River	October 10, 1996 (#96001110)	US 59, 1.4 mi (2.3 km). N of jct. with FM 1960; 30°01′39″N 95°15′28″W	Humble	
24	Sterling S. Ross House	Sterling S. Ross House	October 29, 1982 (#82004858)	515 Bayridge Rd. 29°40′07″N 94°59′42″W	Morgan's Point	
25	Dr. James M. and Dove Stewart House	Dr. James M. and Dove Stewart House	February 16, 1996 (#96000067)	5702 Fourth St. 29°47′21″N 95°49′21″W	Katy	
26	Sylvan Beach Pavilion	Sylvan Beach Pavilion	September 9, 2010 (#10000738)	554 N Bayshore Dr. 29°39′04″N 95°00′38″W	La Porte	
27	U.S.S. TEXAS	U.S.S. TEXAS	December 8, 1976 (#76002039)	22 mi (35 km). E of Houston on TX 134 at San Jacinto Battleground; 29°45′21″N 95°05′22″W	Houston	
28	Walker House	Walker House	April 10, 2012 (#12000195)	3534 Miramar Dr. 29°37′09″N 95°00′14″W	Shoreacres	
29	Washburn Tunnel	Washburn Tunnel	April 16, 2008 (#08000316)	3198 Washburn Tunnel; 29°43′35″N 95°12′43″W	Pasadena	
30	James M. and Jessie West Mansion	James M. and Jessie West Mansion	August 19, 1994 (#94001015)	3303 NASA Rd. 1; 29°33′37″N 95°04′28″W	Pasadena	Demolished in 2019
31	Woodlawn Garden of Memories Cemetery	Woodlawn Garden of Memories Cemetery	October 22, 2004 (#04001174)	1101 Antoine; 29°47′18″N 95°28′41″W	Houston	
32	Peter and Sophie Wunderlich Farm		February 27, 1997 (#97000202)	18202 Theiss Mail Rd. 30°01′49″N 95°32′54″W	Klein	
33	Wunsche Bros. Saloon and Hotel	Wunsche Bros. Saloon and Hotel	February 16, 1984 (#84001849)	103 Midway St. 30°04′44″N 95°25′03″W	Spring	

== Former listings ==
	Name on the Register	Image	Date listed	Date removed	Location	City or town	Description
1	Dr. B. J. Covington House		November 15, 1978 (#78002941)	February 7, 1979	2219 Dowling St. 29°44′24″N 95°21′37″W	Houston	Demolished on October 26, 1978.
2	General Mercantile Store	General Mercantile Store	June 4, 1997 (#97000545)	August 18, 2014	7322 N. Main St. 29°49′01″N 95°23′33″W	Houston	
3	Bill Mraz Dance Hall		March 5, 1998 (#98000219)	December 22, 2004	835 W. 34th Street; 29°49′00″N 95°24′57″W	Houston	Destroyed by fire in October 2004

== See also ==
- List of National Historic Landmarks in Texas
- National Register of Historic Places listings in Texas
- Recorded Texas Historic Landmarks in Harris County
