= History of the Bay Area =

History of the Bay Area can refer to

- The history of the San Francisco Bay Area
- The History of the Galveston Bay Area
- The history of the Tampa Bay Area
- The history of the Monterey Bay Area
