= Orcoquisac =

Orcoquisac may refer to:

- The Akokisa tribe of Texas, United States
- El Orcoquisac Archeological District, a site near modern Wallisville, Texas which was once a French and Spanish post for trading with the Akokisa
