= Oscar Lindsay House =

- U.S. National Register of Historic Places
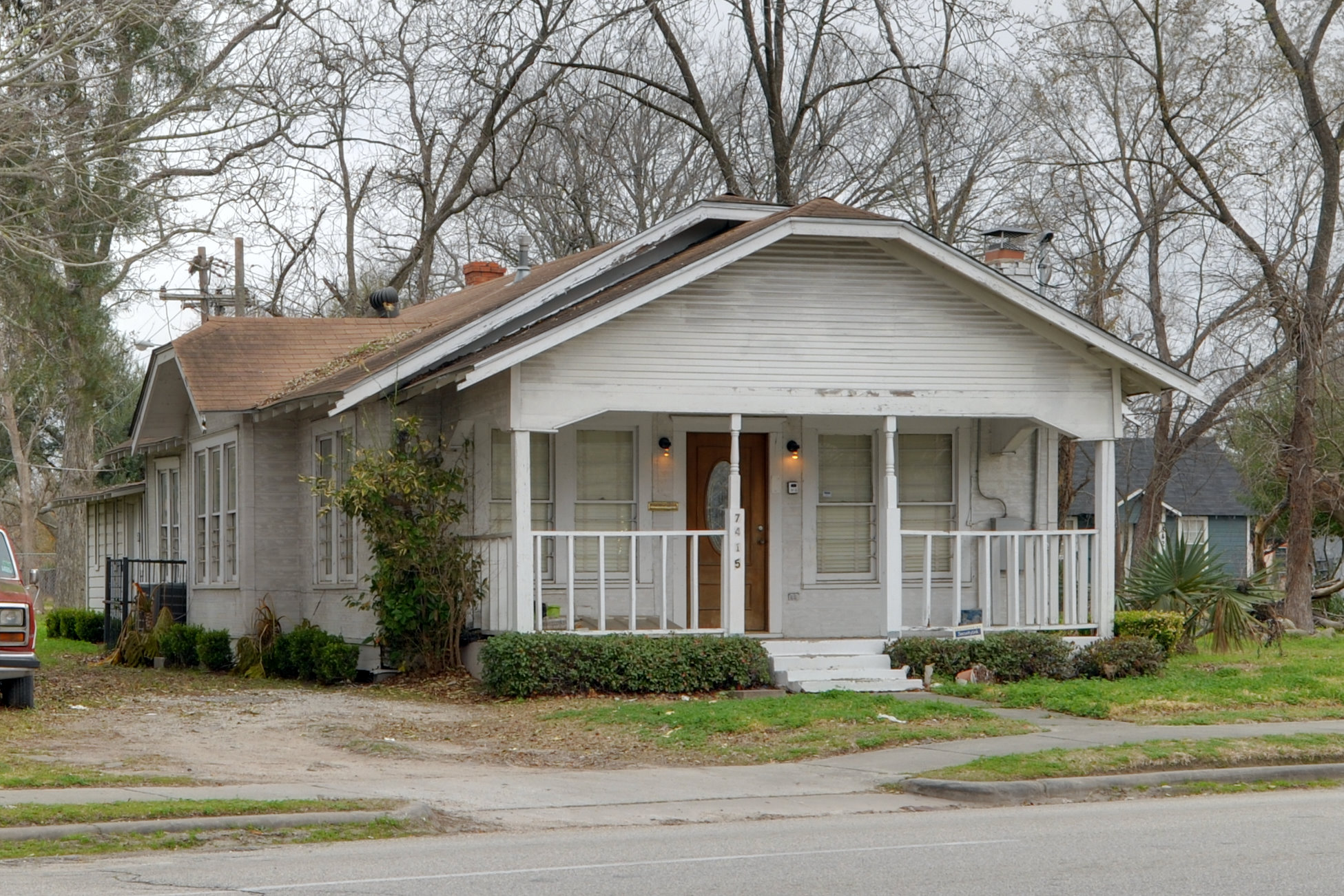

- Location within Texas Location within the United States
- Location: 7415 N. Main St., Houston, Texas
- Coordinates: 29°49′02″N 95°23′34″W
- Area: less than one acre
- Built: c.1920
- Architectural style: Bungalow/craftsman
- MPS: Independence Heights MPS
- NRHP reference No.: 97000546
- Added to NRHP: June 4, 1997

The Oscar Lindsay House, at 7415 N. Main St. in Houston, Texas, was built around 1920. It was listed on the National Register of Historic Places in 1997.

It is a one-story bungalow house located in the middle of the Independence Heights neighborhood. It was deemed significant as "one of the most intact properties associated with an important businessman and city official of Independence Heights." Oscar Lindsay served as city plumber. He also operated a cleaning and pressing shop, a barber shop and an ice cream parlor business, with the latter in his front yard, taking advantage of its location on the busiest street. The NRHP nomination was prepared by a member of the Independence Heights Neighborhood Council.

== See also ==
- Independence Heights Residential Historic District, also NRHP-listed
