= Allen Ranch =

Ranch in Texas, US

Coordinates: 29°40′34″N 95°10′26″W

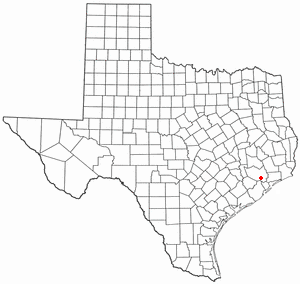

The Allen Ranch, or Sam Allen Ranch, was one of the first and longest running ranches in the history of the state of Texas in the United States. The ranch was started a few years after the Texas Revolution in what is now southeast Houston and Pasadena. The ranch itself extended from Clear Lake to Harrisburg (in modern east Houston). The cattle range covered much of southeast Harris County and Galveston County covering many of the modern communities around Galveston Bay.

The financial success of the Allen Ranch and its associated businesses substantially influenced the early development of Houston, Harrisburg and Pasadena, and contributed significantly to Galveston's economy in the 19th century.

== Beginnings ==
As a young man Samuel W. Allen (no relation to the Allen Brothers who founded Houston) came to the newly established Republic of Texas in 1842 in search of opportunity. He arrived at the young town of Harrisburg (modern east Houston) and soon after married into the Thomas family which had come to Texas as part of Stephen F. Austin's original colony. Usurping the traditional lands of the Karankawa, Atakapa, and Akokisa tribes, he utilized the land from the Thomas grant which was located along the Buffalo Bayou between Harrisburg and Galveston Bay (what is now Pasadena) Sam Allen launched a cattle ranch in 1844. His cattle range extended much farther down the shoreline of the bay.

Like many ranchers in Texas, Allen began his herd by gathering Longhorn cattle, descended from Spanish cattle brought to the New World, which ran wild throughout Texas. Allen's herd grew rapidly such that by the 1860s had gained exclusive shipping rights for cattle to New Orleans and Cuba from the Morgan Lines, Texas' first steamship company, which was later to become a major factor in establishing Houston as an important Texas port and railroad shipping center.

== Boom times ==
Allen's fortunes grew rapidly after the American Civil War. Through partnerships and acquisitions Allen's main ranch expanded and he gained ranch lands in other areas of the state. He established processing plants for cattle hides and tallow along the Buffalo Bayou near his range as well as Galveston. The Galveston, Houston and Henderson Railroad was built through the Allen Ranch in the 1850s and later the Gulf, Colorado and Santa Fe Railway and the La Porte, Houston and Northern Railroad. The ranch's docks along the Buffalo Bayou became major shipping points and helped contribute to the growth of what would become the Houston Ship Channel. The ranch even had its own private railway station known as "El Buey."

After the Civil War, Texas Jack Omohundro got his first job in Texas cooking for cowboys on the Allen Ranch before working his way up to working cowboy and finally trail boss. He would later find fame in Ned Buntline's play The Scouts of the Prairie alongside his friend and partner Buffalo Bill Cody. Omohundro wrote about his time as a cowboy for the Allen Ranch in the Spirit of the Times, which was later reprinted in programmes and brochures for Buffalo Bill's Wild West.

Sam W. Allen's son, Samuel E. Allen, took over management of the ranch and, though some of Sam W. Allen's other business ventures failed, the Allen Ranch continued to prosper and grow. It was the largest ranch in the region and one of the largest in the state. By 1900 the Allen Ranch comprised over 17,000 acres (69 km^{2}) largely in Harris County with pastures in Galveston County and other surrounding counties. The main portions of the ranch covered much of modern Pasadena, southeast Houston, Clear Lake City, La Porte, and other areas.

The Allens invested heavily in area business development, in Galveston and Harrisburg, and then later Houston (notably they founded the Oriental Textile Mills, once the world's largest press cloth manufacturer in the cotton industry). They were also wealthy socialites known throughout the region.

== Modern era ==
Following Sam E. Allen's death in 1913, much of the family's ranch holdings were sold off to new development around Pasadena and the growing city of Houston. Sam E. Allen's son, Sam M. Allen, continued to operate the remaining portion on the main ranch in Harris County as well as the ranch lands in Brazoria County. Following Sam M. Allen's death in 1947, the remainder of the ranch was liquidated.

Today many areas of Houston, Pasadena, and other cities bear names referring to the Allen family and the ranch properties.

== See also ==
- History of the Galveston Bay Area
- History of Houston
- Pasadena, Texas
