= Armand Bayou Archeological District =

Historic district in Texas, United States

- U.S. National Register of Historic Places
- U.S. Historic district
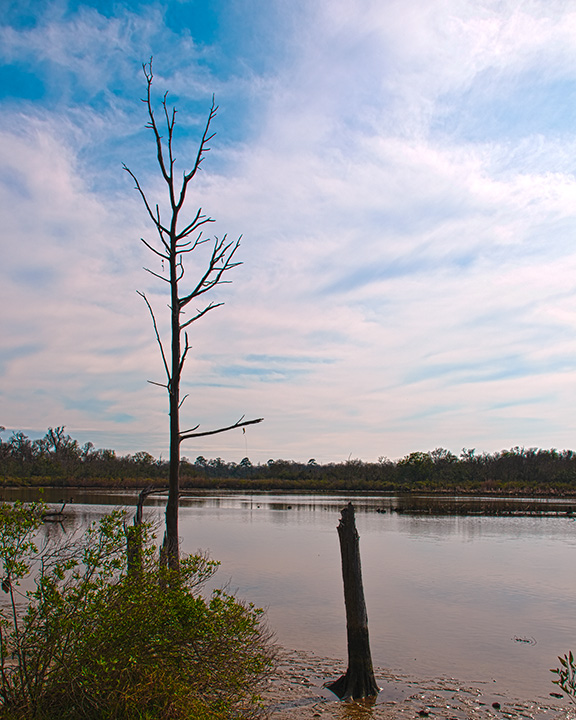
- Nearest city: Pasadena, Texas
- Area: 4,480 acres (1,810 ha)
- NRHP reference No.: 78002952
- Added to NRHP: December 12, 1978

The Armand Bayou Archeological District is a historical district located near Houston, Texas listed on the National Register of Historic Places. The district is part of the Armand Bayou Watershed which is located in southeast Harris County, encompassing portions of the cities of Houston, Pasadena, Deer Park, La Porte and Taylor Lake Village.

Humans first arrived in this bayou area seven to eight thousand years ago. These humans were nomadic Native Americans composed of the Karankawa, Attakapa, and Coahuiltecan peoples. Approximately twenty middens (prehistoric waste sites) have been found along the Bayou.
