= Armand Yramategui =

American naturalist (1923–1970)

Armand Yramategui (1923-1970) was a Texan naturalist. Educated as an electrical engineer at Rice Institute (today Rice University), Yramategui developed an interest in nature and publicly advocated for conservation. He worked at the Houston Museum of Natural Science as a natural science teacher in 1963, then as curator at the Burke Baker Planetarium in 1965.

In 1970, Yramategui was traveling to view a comet when he suffered a flat tire. He was robbed of his astronomy equipment and killed by a juvenile. After his death, the Department of Interior awarded Yramategui the Conservation Service Award, the highest honor that could be granted a non-employee. Pasadena City Council renamed Middle Bayou in the city after Yramategui (Armand Bayou), and the Armand Bayou Nature Center was established there in 1974.
