= Bill Mraz Dance Hall =

- Mraz, Bill, Dance Hall
- Formerly listed on the U.S. National Register of Historic Places
- Location within Texas Location within the United States
- Location: 835 W. 34th St., Houston, Texas
- Coordinates: 29.740107°N 95.360225°W
- Area: 2.6 acres (1.1 ha)
- Built: 1948
- Built by: Willie (Bill) H. Mraz
- NRHP reference No.: 98000219

Significant dates
- Added to NRHP: March 5, 1998
- Removed from NRHP: December 22, 2004

The Bill Mraz Dance Hall, located at 835 West 34th Street in Houston, Texas, was listed on the National Register of Historic Places on March 5, 1998. However, it was delisted on December 22, 2004, after being destroyed by a fire in October 2004.

== See also ==
- National Register of Historic Places listings in outer Harris County, Texas
