= Lake Charlotte (Texas) =

Lake in Texas

- Interactive map of Lake Charlotte
- Location: Near Wallisville, Texas
- Coordinates: 29.86730°N 94.72570°W
- Type: Estuarine lake
- Primary inflows: Mac Bayou
- Basin countries: United States
- Max. length: 1.5 m (4 ft 11 in)
- Max. width: 1.5 m (4 ft 11 in)

Lake Charlotte is an estuarine lake located three miles outside of Wallisville, Texas a town northeast of the Houston metroplex. The lake connects to the Trinity Rivers system by way of the Mac Bayou. The lake is 1 1/2 miles long by 1 1/2 miles wide and encircled by a cypress swamp. Lake Charlotte is an integral part of the marshland ecosystem in the area, providing a habitat to many marine and freshwater species.

== History ==
Lake Charlotte has been a recreational area since the days of the Texas Revolution when sail boats were used along the Trinity River. Archaeological evidence discovered on the lakes shore has also shown that native americans utilized the water body as a source for clams, oysters, and mussels The lake was named after Charlotte Barthe Labadie, the mother of Nicholas Descomps Labadie. Nicholas Descomps Labadie served as a surgeon for Sam Houstons Army during the Battle of San Jacinto. Labadie owned a plantation along the shores of Lake Charlotte from 1833-1851 where he raised livestock and worked as physician.

== Recreation ==
Lake Charlotte is a part of the Wallisville lake project that comprised 23,000 acres of protected wetlands created by the U.S. Army Corps of Engineers. The projects main goals include salinity control, navigation, water supply and the protection of the surrounded wetlands and wildlife. The project includes two parks; Cedar Hill Park and Hugo Point Park, as well as two areas of recreation; Trinity River Island Recreation Area and JJ Mayes Wildlife Trace.

== Local fauna ==
A variety of freshwater and saltwater species can be found at Lake Charlotte depending on the weather and time of year. Bald eagles have been seen hunting for fish in the lake. During the winter months Osprey and cormorants can also be observed. A variety of fish can be found along the connecting Trinity River and in Lake Charlotte including bullhead catfish, bull sharks, and flounder.
