= Independence Heights, Houston =

Community in Houston, Texas

Independence Heights also known as “Studewood”, is a community in Houston, Texas, bordered by W Tidwell Rd to the north, Yale Street to the west, the 610 Loop to the south, and Airline Drive to the east. The Super Neighborhood boundary created by the City of Houston is bordered by Tidwell to the north, Shepherd Drive to the west, the 610 Loop to the south, and Interstate 45 to the east.

== History ==
Black families started to migrate to Northern Houston known as the Independence Heights around 1908. The area was developed by Wright Land Company, and consisted of small wood-frame houses, purchased by the residents. Many of the houses were built by black contractors who lived in the area.

Independence Heights became the first African American municipality in Texas when it was incorporated on January 25, 1915 with a population of nearly 600. Several of the residents worked in Houston, some of the residents worked in the Houston Heights, and some residents worked in other areas. The city had 715 residents in 1920. George O. Burgess, a lawyer born in Milligan Texas in 1876, was elected its first mayor. Burgess Hall, located at 700 E. 34th Street, was the City Hall and Courthouse until 1919. City improvements over the next few years included the shell paving of streets, plank sidewalks, and the installation of a municipal water system.

O. L. Hubbard was the second Mayor of Independence Heights, serving from June 19, 1919, until 1925. Arthur L. McCullough became the third and final Mayor of Independence Heights. He served from 1925 to 1928. In November 1928, residents voted to dissolve the incorporation of Independence Heights so the community could become a part of Houston. Houston annexed the former city on December 26, 1929. The residents hoped to receive improved city services, streets, utilities from the annexation; this did not occur.

In the late 1920s, the 40 black-owned businesses in Independence Heights included grocery stores, restaurants, a lumber company, a watch repair shop, ice cream parlors, a cleaning and pressing shop, a drug store, a black smith shop, law offices and an electrical shop. Other professionals employed there included: teachers, construction workers, longshoremen and rail road workers.

In 1989 a Texas Historical Commission marker was placed on the grounds of Greater New Hope Missionary Baptist Church to mark the city site as a Texas Historical Site.

In 1997, the National Park Service recognized the historic residential district and specific historic buildings within Independence Heights by listing them on the National Register of Historic Places.

The NRHP-listed places are:

- Independence Park, aka McCullough Park
- William Mackey House
- Ben C. and Jenetter Cyrus House
- Charles Johnson House
- Independence Heights Residential Historic District
- Ella Lewis Store and Rental Houses
- Oscar Lindsay House

From 1990 to 2000, the black population of Independence Heights declined by 1,793 as majority African-American neighborhoods in Houston had declines in their black populations.

=== Former Mayors of Independence Heights ===
- G. O. Burgess
- O. L. Hubbard
- Arthur L. McCullough

== Government and infrastructure ==
Independence Heights is in Houston City Council District H.

Independence Heights is within the Houston Police Department (HPD) North Patrol Division.

Harris Health System (formerly Harris County Hospital District) designated the Northwest Health Center for the ZIP code 77018 and the Aldine Health Center for the ZIP code 77022. The designated public hospitals for the two ZIP codes were Ben Taub General Hospital and Lyndon B. Johnson Hospital in northeast Houston, respectively.

== Education ==
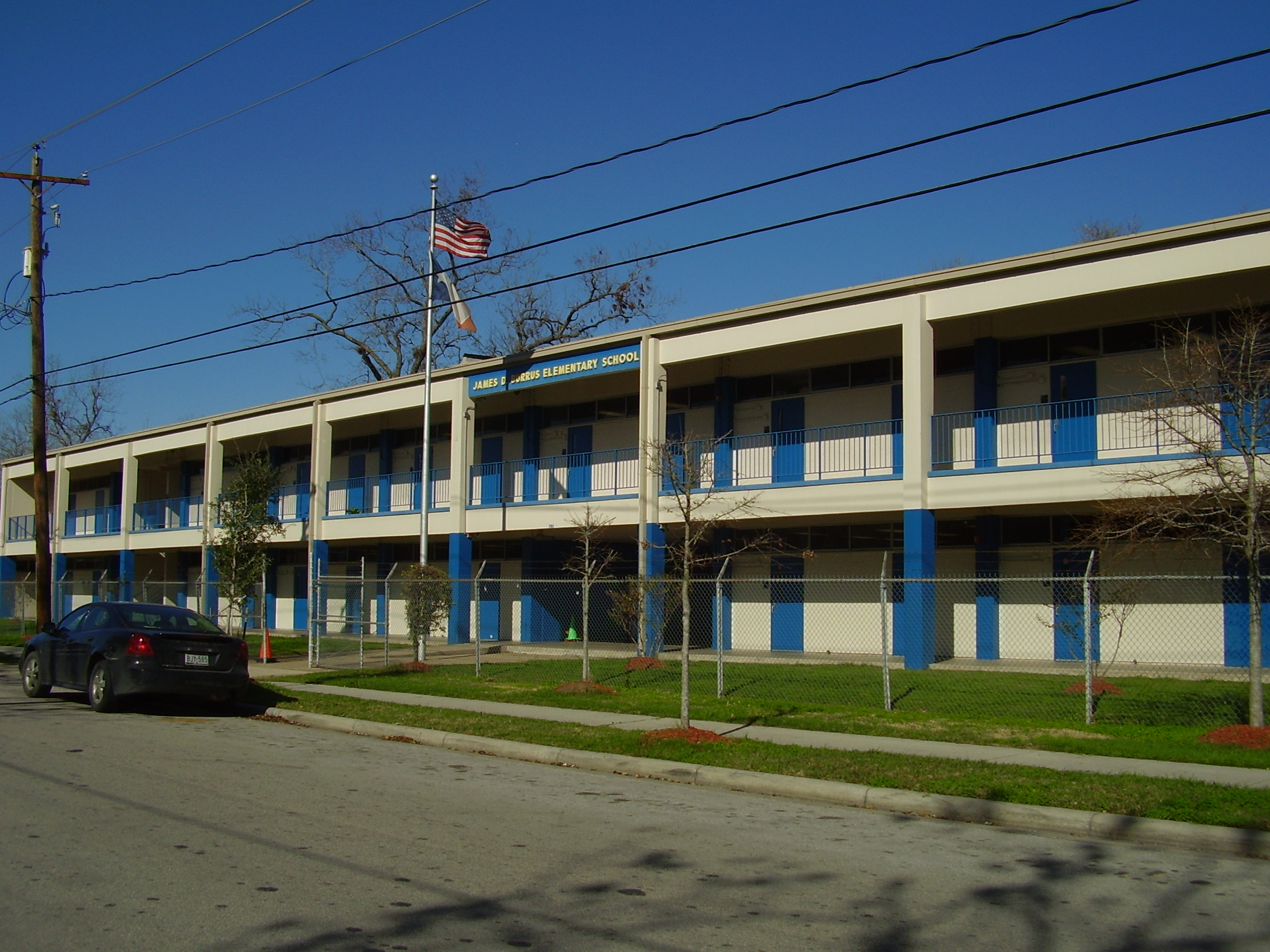
Burrus Elementary School

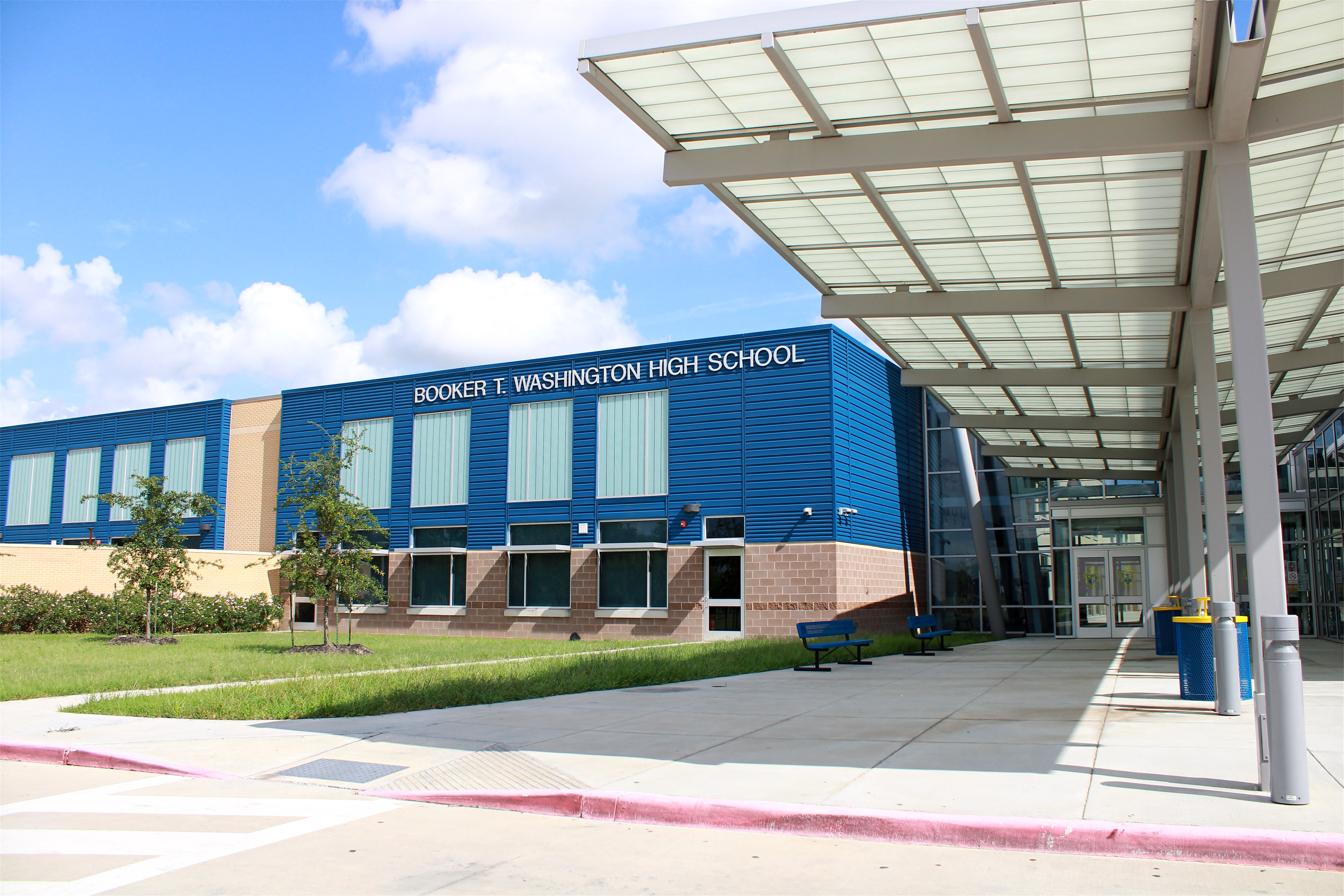
Booker T. Washington High School

The Houston Independent School District serves Independence Heights.

All of Independence Heights is zoned to Burrus Elementary School in Independence Heights. The northern portion (north of East 36th Street) is zoned to Williams Middle School in Acres Homes, while the southern portion (south of East 36th Street) is zoned to Hamilton Middle School in the Houston Heights. All of Independence Heights is zoned to Booker T. Washington High School, within Independence Heights.

Prior to 2009 a section of Independence Heights was zoned to Kennedy Elementary School; in 2009 the portion was rezoned to Burrus Elementary School.

The original campus of the Houston Sudbury School, a private Sudbury school, was in Independence Heights.

Independence Heights has no public library. By 2009 several residents had requested a community center. During that year, Isa Dadoush, a general services manager of the City of Houston said that the city was investigating possibilities for a joint library and multiservice center. Dadoush said that the city considered a church for a site. In 2009 the city was considering the usage of a property at North Main and Whitman for a three purpose center which would be completed in 2010 and include community education, neighborhood recycling, and reusable materials.

== Parks ==
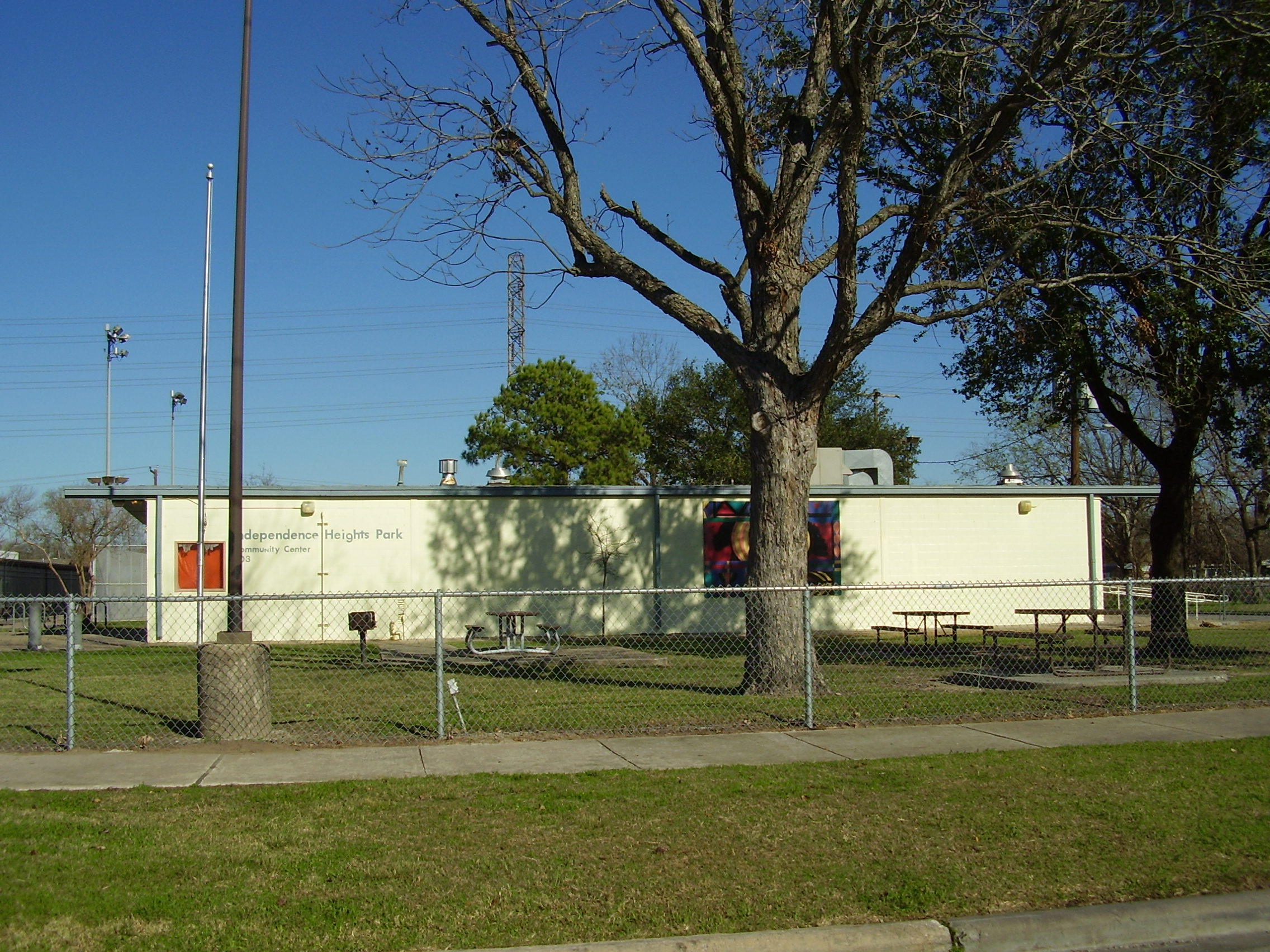
Independence Heights Park and Community Center

The Independence Heights Park and Community Center is located in Independence Heights. The center has a playground and a lighted sports field. The park has an outdoor basketball pavilion, a swimming pool, and lighted tennis courts. The community center and pool opened in 1970. In 2010 about 43 people per day visited the community center during the 50 weeks that it was open. 36 people per day used the pool during that year's summer season, which lasted 70 days, In May 2011 the city announced that it will close the community center and the swimming pool.

== Culture ==
In the wake of the murder of George Floyd in 2020, a "Black Towns Matter" mural was established.

== See also ==
- History of African Americans in Houston
