= Barker-Cypress Archeological Site =

Coordinates: 29°58′N 95°42′W

- U.S. National Register of Historic Places
- Nearest city: Houston, Texas
- Area: less than one acre
- NRHP reference No.: 84001753
- Added to NRHP: April 24, 1984

The Barker-Cypress Archeological Site is a prehistoric preservation area located in Cypress, Harris County, Texas and listed on the National Register of Historic Places. Due to restrictions from the Texas Historic Commission, the exact site location cannot be revealed.

== Excavation ==
In 2009, in preparation for a Harris County Flood Control District erosion control project, archaeologists from Moore Archeological Consulting conducting an excavation of Cypress Creek unearthed thousands of Akokisa artifacts including stone tools, arrow points and pottery shards. The oldest materials found during excavation date back to 8,100 B.C., but most were from two periods: the early ceramic period, which ran from 8,100 B.C. to 800, or the late ceramic period from 800 to when Europeans began arriving in North America in the 10th century.

The artifacts found in 2009 are due to be housed at the Texas Archeological Research Laboratory at the University of Texas.
