= Ben C. and Jenetter Cyrus House =

- U.S. National Register of Historic Places
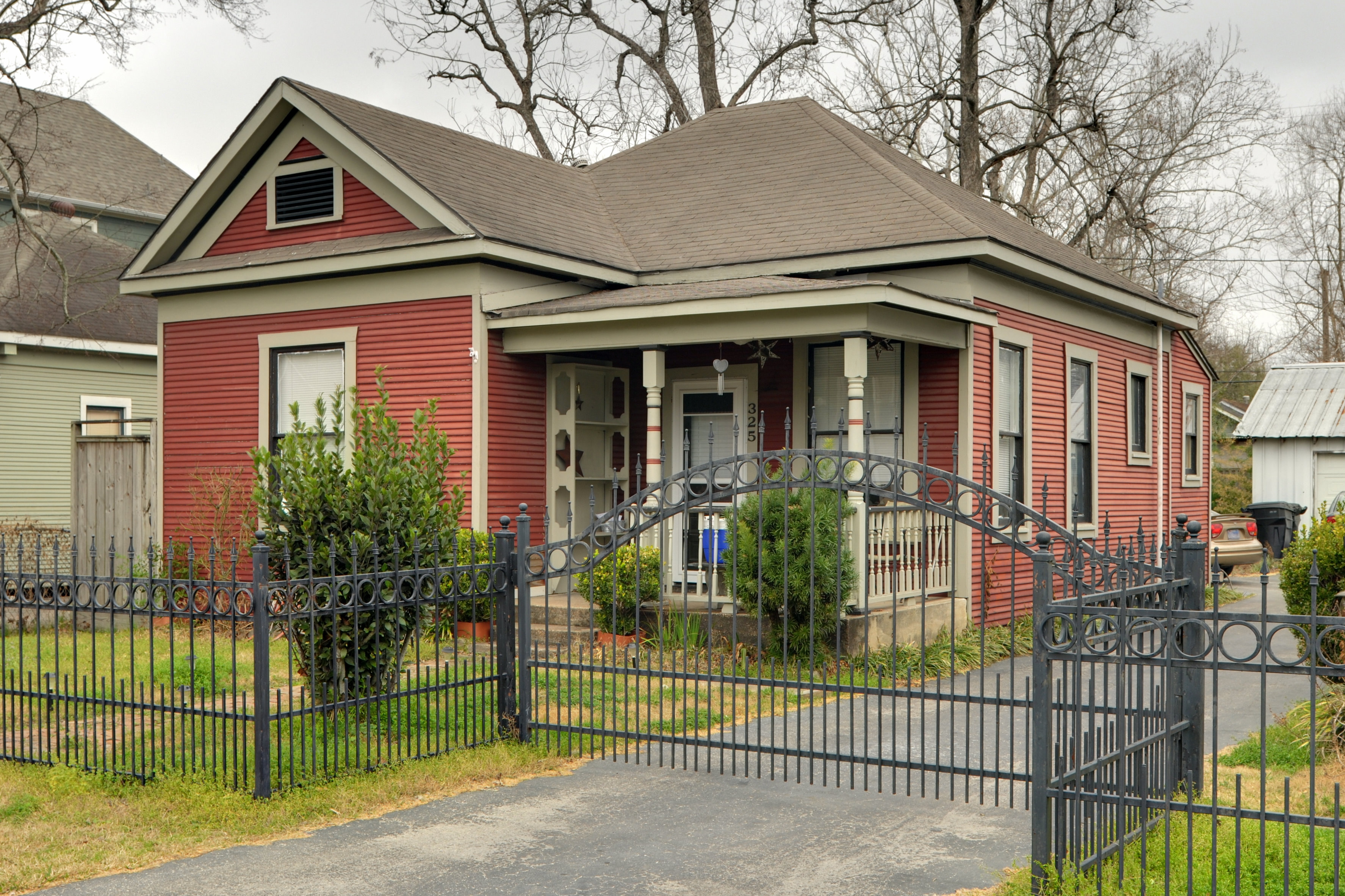

- Location within Texas
- Location: 325 E. 25th St., Houston, Texas
- Coordinates: 29°49′05″N 95°23′33″W
- Area: less than one acre
- Built: 1915
- MPS: Independence Heights MPS
- NRHP reference No.: 97000549
- Added to NRHP: June 4, 1997

The Ben C. and Jenetter Cyrus House, at 325 E. 25th St. in the Independence Heights neighborhood of Houston, Texas, was built around 1915, near the center of Independence Heights. It was listed on the National Register of Historic Places in 1997.

It was described in its NRHP nomination as "typical of the housing for many of the middle-class residents of Independence Heights. Ben Cyrus operated a jitney service in downtown Houston from about 1915 to the early 1920s. Jitneys provided a basic form of mass transportation in a number of major cities during this period and competed with electric streetcars. Black jitneys served a special role for the African American population as an alternative to other segregated forms of transportation. The City of Houston banned by ordinance all black owned jitneys in 1922-24 at the insistence of the Houston Electric Company, operators of the streetcar line and developing motor bus transportation." The property deemed significant in the area of Ethnic Heritage (black)."

About the house: "Although modest in detailing, the house is typical of forms constructed in the city in the mid 1910s. The Cyrus House served as a domestic space for the family but also a headquarters for his jitney service in Houston."
