= Wallisville, Texas =

- Unincorporated community
- Location within Texas Location within the United States
- Coordinates: 29°50′08″N 94°44′31″W
- Country: United States
- State: Texas
- County: Chambers
- Elevation: 7 ft (2.1 m)
- Time zone: UTC-6 (Central (CST))
  - Summer (DST): UTC-5 (CDT)
- Area code: 409
- GNIS feature ID: 1379227

Wallisville is an unincorporated town in northern Chambers County, Texas, United States. According to the Handbook of Texas, the community had a population of 460 in 2000. It is located within the Greater Houston metropolitan area.

== History ==
A military settlement, known as "El Orcoquisac", consisting of the Spanish fort, Presidio San Augustín de Ahumada and its complementing partner, Mission Nuestra Señora de la Luz, was established in 1756, on the east bank of the Trinity River near present-day Wallisville, upon the former site of an early French trading post.

After Hurricane Ike, the United States Postal Service temporarily relocated Wallisville post office box services to Mont Belvieu, Texas.

Although it is unincorporated, Wallisville has a post office, with the ZIP code of 77597.

== Geography ==
Wallisville is located on Interstate 10 on the east side of the Trinity River, 42 mi (68 km) west of Beaumont, 20 mi (32 km) east of Baytown, and 11 mi (18 km) northwest of Anahuac in northern Chambers County. Lake Charlotte is located three miles outside of the community.

=== Climate ===
The climate in this area is characterized by hot, humid summers and generally mild to cool winters. According to the Köppen Climate Classification system, Wallisville has a humid subtropical climate, abbreviated "Cfa" on climate maps.

On January 24, 2023, an Ef0 tornado struck the community. It crossed Interstate 10 and damaged some trees.

== Education ==
Wallisville had a school in 1869 and remained standing for the Methodist congregation and several others to hold church services in. Today, the community is served by the Anahuac Independent School District.

== Wallisville Heritage Park ==
In 1979 a private, nonprofit organization named the Wallisville Heritage Park was organized by concerned residents interested in saving the original Wallisville townsite. This organization operates for the preservation, restoration, and study of the Wallisville Townsite and the El Orcoquisac Archeological District, two sites that are listed in the National Register of Historic Places.

The Chambers County Museum is also located in Wallisville.

== Notable people ==
- Mayes Middleton, politician and businessman, was born in Wallisville.
