= William Mackey House (Houston, Texas) =

- U.S. National Register of Historic Places
- Location within Texas Location within the United States
- Location: 313 E. 37th St., Houston, Texas
- Coordinates: 29°49′12″N 95°23′43″W
- Area: less than one acre
- Built: 1915
- MPS: Independence Heights MPS
- NRHP reference No.: 97000547
- Added to NRHP: June 4, 1997

The William Mackey House, at 313 E. 37th St. in the Independence Heights neighborhood of Houston, Texas, was built around 1915. It was listed on the National Register of Historic Places in 1997.

It is a modified L-plan form house, of type popular at the turn of the 20th century, and "reflects local builder and homeowner preferences for a traditional house form."

It was home of William Mackey, a community leader. He was Camp Commander of the American Woodmen Camp 272 and Tent 272, one of three fraternal organizations in Independence Heights. No other properties historically associated with other fraternal organizations survive. The house also was the "initial meeting place for the Unity School of Christianity. Although little is known about the school, it was one of the many religious groups that organized in the community during the early 20th century. Several extant church congregations began in the homes of local residents, but almost none of these remain."
