= General Mercantile Store =

- Formerly listed on the U.S. National Register of Historic Places
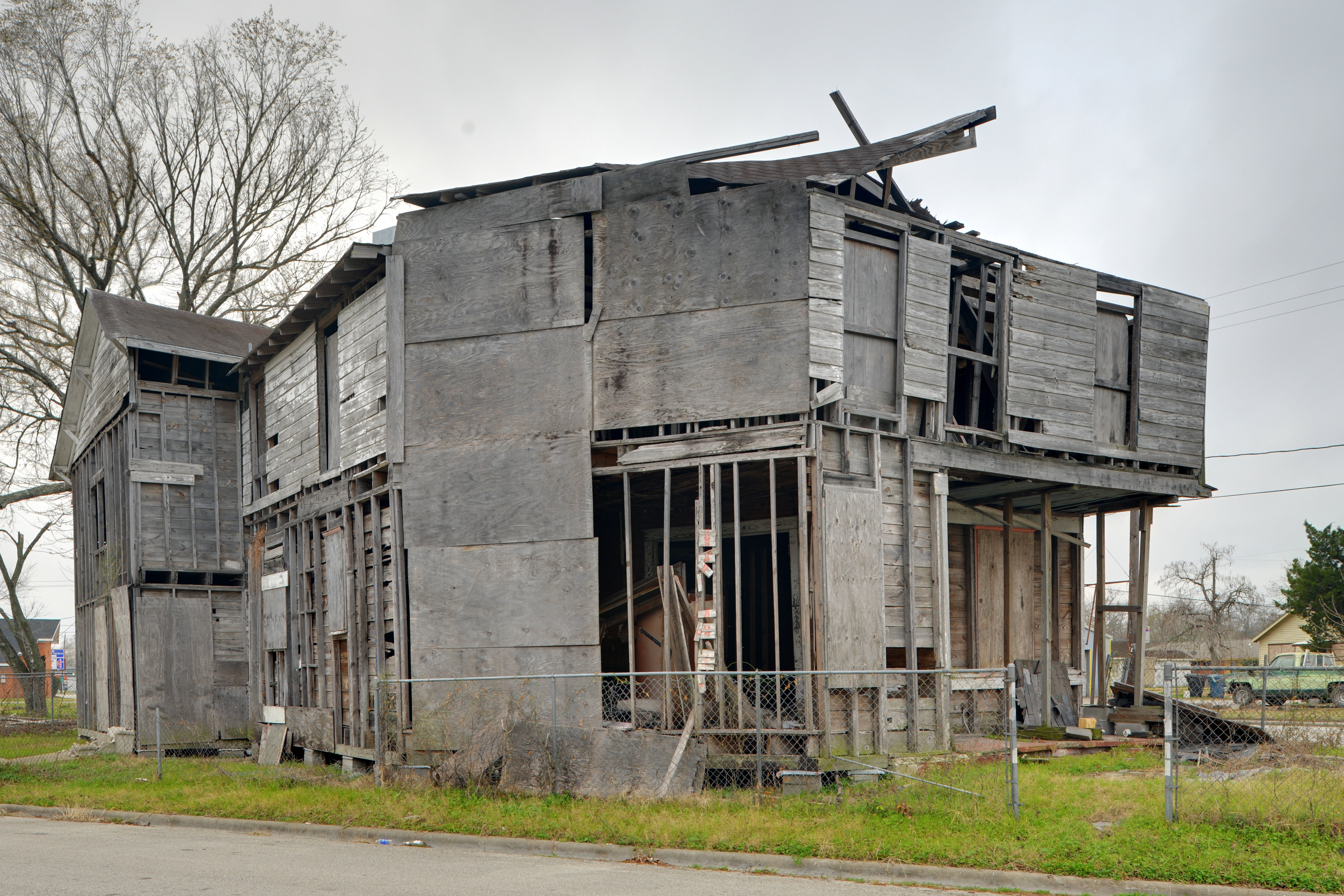
- The building in 2011

- Location within Texas Location within the United States
- Location: 7322 N. Main Street; Houston, Texas
- Coordinates: 29°49′1″N 95°23′33″W
- Area: less than one acre
- Built: 1920
- MPS: Independence Heights MPS
- NRHP reference No.: 97000545

Significant dates
- Added to NRHP: June 4, 1997
- Removed from NRHP: August 18, 2014

The General Mercantile Store was a building in Houston, Texas, listed on the National Register of Historic Places. The building was constructed in 1920 and was added to the National Register on June 4, 1997. It was delisted in August 2014.

== See also ==
- National Register of Historic Places listings in Harris County, Texas
