= McCullough Park (Houston) =

Park in Houston, Texas, United States

- Independence Park
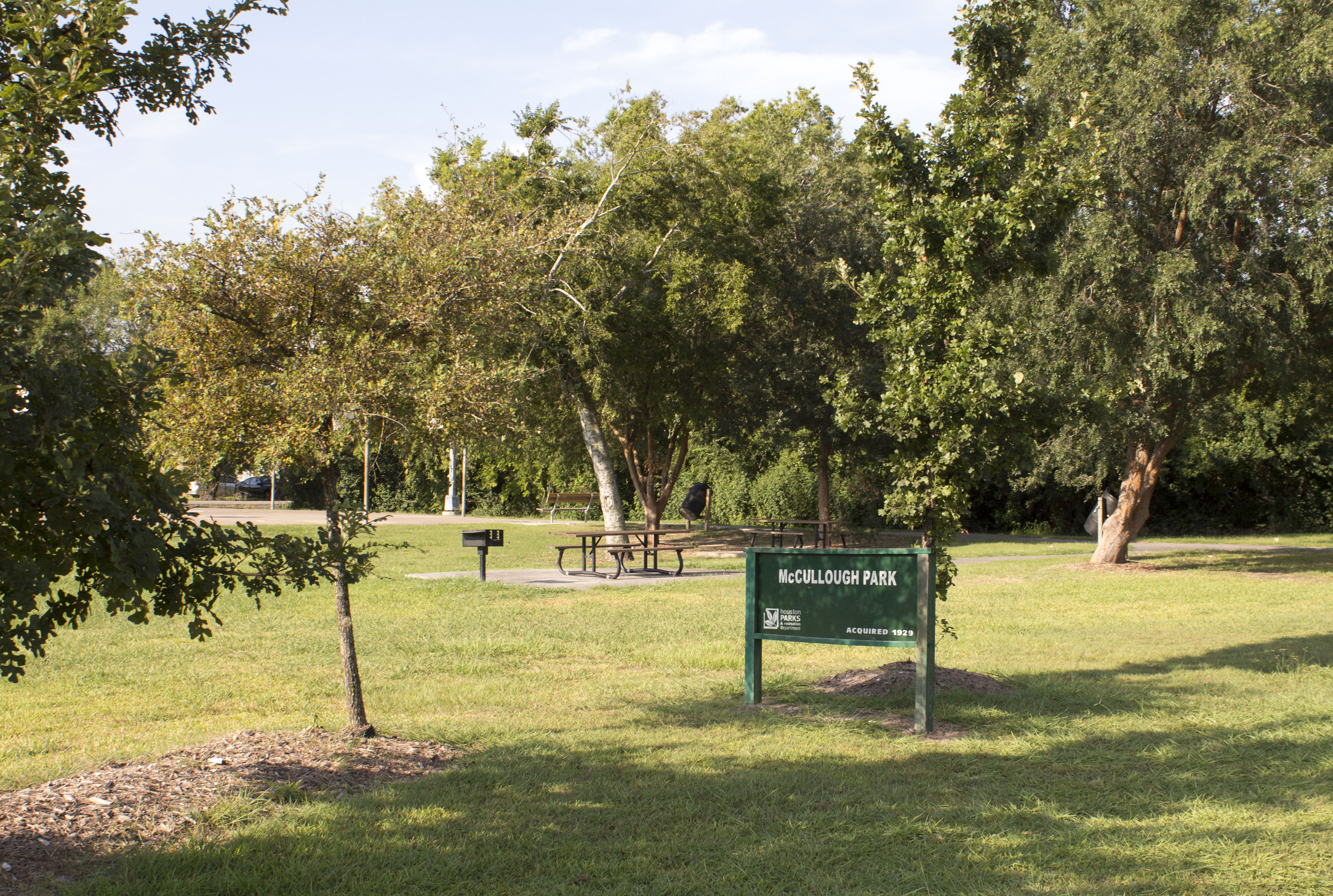
- Interactive map of McCullough Park
- Type: Urban park
- Location: Roughly bounded by 1000 Blk. of E. 40th, Houston, Texas, United States
- Coordinates: 29°49′21″N 95°23′11″W
- Area: less than one acre
- Created: 1910
- Manager: Houston Parks and Recreation Department
- McCullough Park
- U.S. National Register of Historic Places
- MPS: Independence Heights MPS
- NRHP reference No.: 97000544
- Added to NRHP: June 4, 1997

McCullough Park is a park located in the Independence Heights neighborhood of Houston, Texas, which is listed on the National Register of Historic Places. It was originally called Independence Park but was renamed after James McCullough, an early resident of Independence Heights, by the city of Houston after its acquisition of the area in 1929. It remains McCullough Park to this day. This is different from the newer Independence Park acquired in 1967 at 601 East 35th St.

Its NRHP nomination states: "Independence Park is the only public space remaining from the early years of Independence Heights. In 1910, the Wright Land Company set aside some eight lots in the northeast portion of the subdivision for a community park and named it Independence Park. The park provided important community space for church gatherings, school activities, and annual Juneteenth celebrations. Although parks were often part of white neighborhoods during this period, few African American communities had such dedicated space and few larger community parks were open to blacks."

Elsewhere segregation in parks "was enforced by custom first and then by local ordinance in 1922".

It was listed on the National Register in 1997 as "Independence Park".

== See also ==
- National Register of Historic Places listings in Harris County, Texas
