= Charles Johnson House =

Historic house in Houston, Texas, US

- U.S. National Register of Historic Places
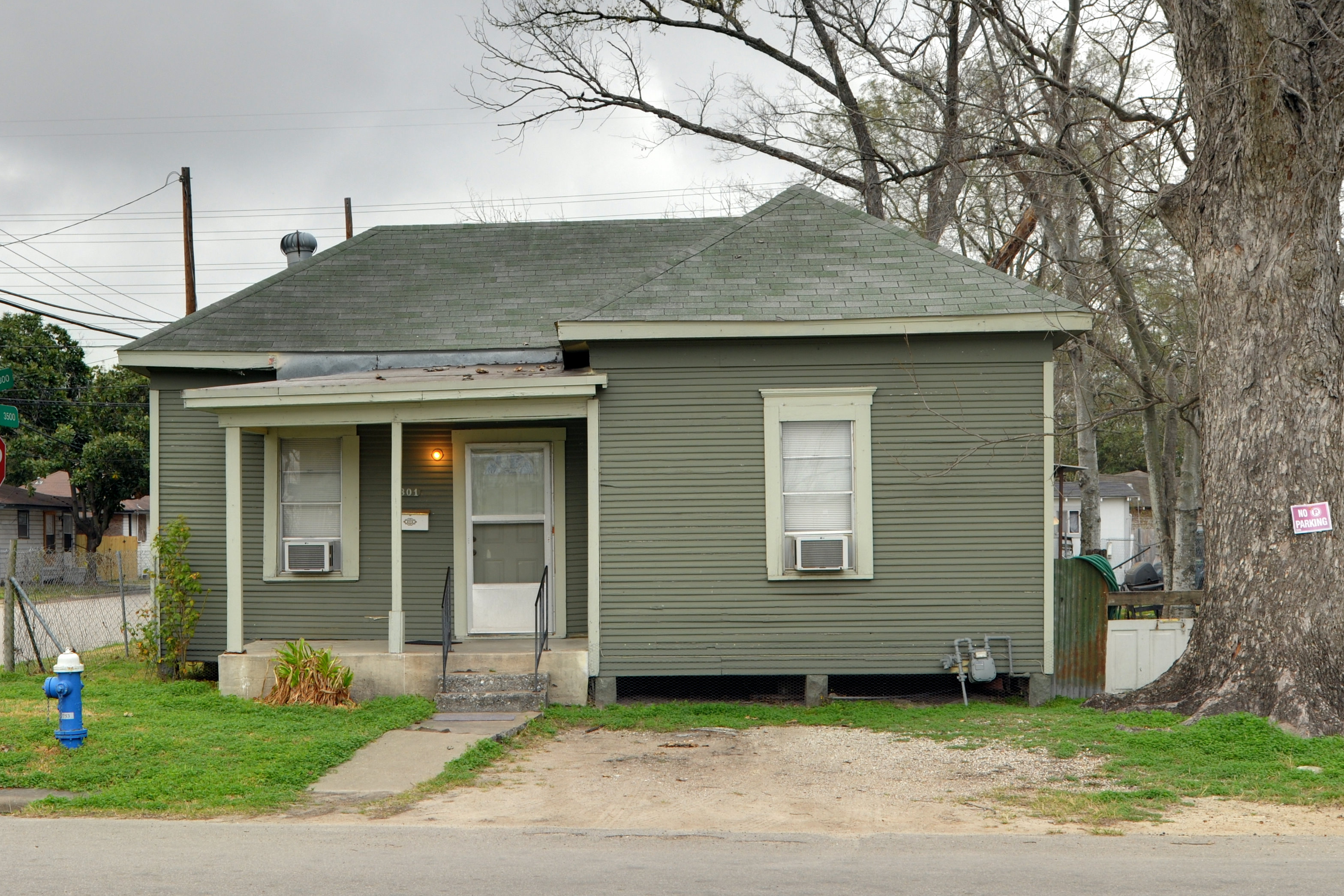

- Location within Texas Location within the United States
- Location: 301 E. 35th St., Houston, Texas
- Coordinates: 29°49′05″N 95°23′45″W
- Area: less than one acre
- Built: c. 1915
- MPS: Independence Heights MPS
- NRHP reference No.: 97000550
- Added to NRHP: June 4, 1997

The Charles Johnson House, at 301 E. 35th St. in Houston, Texas, was built around 1915. It was listed on the National Register of Historic Places in 1997.

It was one of the earliest houses built in the Independence Heights neighborhood. It was deemed notable as "a representative example of an early 20th century vernacular L-plan form similar to many houses in Independence Heights", and for its association with Charles Johnson. Johnson, "known as 'Charlie,' was one of three ice men who provided an important service to residents of Independence Heights as early as 1915 through the 1920s. Typical of many Independence Heights businesses, Johnson operated the delivery service out of his home."
