= Texas City tin smelter =

- Built: March 1941
- Operated: 5 April 1942 – April 1991
- Location: Texas City
- Coordinates: 29.356762°N 94.940918°W
- Industry: Extractive metallurgy
- Products: Tin
- Employees: 850 (1946)
- Area: 170 acres (0.69 km^{2})
- Defunct: April 1991

The Texas City tin smelter is a former metallurgical plant in Texas City and La Marque, United States. It was created in 1942, during the Second World War, to secure the American production of tin from imported ores. It operates until 1991, gradually diversifying.

Founded and operated by the U.S. state as Longhorn Tin Smelter, it produced, towards the end of the war, up to 45% of the world's tin production. But deprived of access to tin ore deposits, it collapsed as soon as the international situation normalized. Privatized, it became, under the name of Tex-Tin Corporation, a pioneering plant in the use of the Kaldo process for the recycling of tin-rich waste.

However, this reconversion was not sufficient to overcome the low availability of tin ores, and the plant was unable to revive. When it closed, soil pollution was significant and the brownfields were taken over by the Environmental Protection Agency. The restoration plan was successfully completed in 2003.
