= Ella Lewis Store and Rental Houses =

- Lewis, Ella, Store and Rental Houses
- U.S. National Register of Historic Places
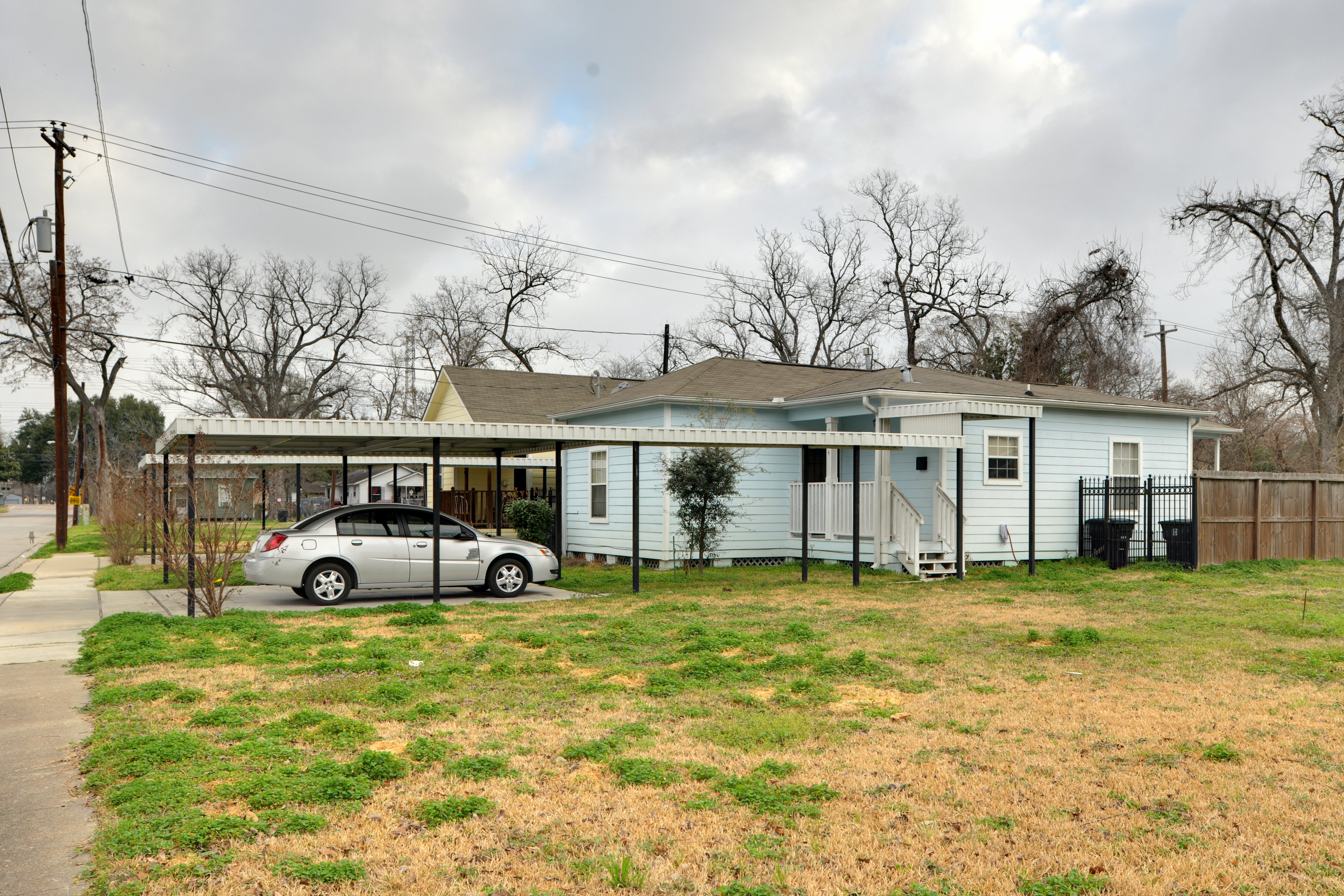

- Location within Texas
- Location: 3404--3406--3408 Courtland St., Houston, Texas
- Coordinates: 29°49′02″N 95°23′44″W
- Area: less than one acre
- Built: c.1920
- Architectural style: Shotgun with Bungalow features
- MPS: Independence Heights MPS
- NRHP reference No.: 97000543
- Added to NRHP: June 4, 1997

The Ella Lewis Store and Rental Houses, at 3404-3406-3408 Courtland St. in Houston, Texas, were built around 1920. The collection was listed on the National Register of Historic Places in 1997. The listing included three contributing buildings.

It included a two-story General Store, which was "the center of businesses operated by Lewis. It is covered in a large gable roof with horizontal siding and is surrounded by large deciduous and omamental trees. Two 1-story rental houses are south of the General Store. These are the last of four houses that continued to the intersection of 34th and Courtland Streets. Each house is noted by a metal gable roof and inset porches in a basic shotgun form with bungalow features."

It was deemed significant as "a significant example of independent businesses operated by African Americans in Independence Heights. They are also representative of local commerce and ethnic heritage."

== See also ==
- Independence Heights Residential Historic District, also NRHP-listed
