= Armand Bayou =

Coordinates: 29°37′0″N 95°6′0″W

Location
- Country: United States

Physical characteristics
- Source
  - location: Pasadena
- Mouth
  - location: Mud Lake / Clear Lake
- Basin size: Armand Bayou Watershed

Armand Bayou is a bayou in U.S. State of Texas. It runs near Galveston Bay in Pasadena and the Clear Lake Area.

== History ==
Native Americans inhabited the Armand Bayou area going back as far as 8,000 years. Archaeological remains suggest frequent native camping in the area. These include trash heaps, as well as better distinguished artifacts, such as arrowpoints and flints. The Akokisas are one group known to frequent the Armand Bayou area.

== Description ==
Armand Bayou runs from its headwaters in Pasadena for about ten miles to the southeast, to its mouth at Mud Lake, near Taylor Lake Village. The 59-square-mile Armand Bayou Watershed includes 89 miles of natural streams, which drain several settlements in southeast Harris County, including Deer Park, La Porte, Pasadena, and Taylor Lake Village. There are over 127,000 persons residing within this watershed.

== Armand Bayou Nature Center ==
The bayou is best known for the Armand Bayou Nature Center, through which it runs. The bayou and the nature center were named for Armand Yramategui, former curator of the Burke Baker Planetarium and environmental leader during the 1960s.

== Environmental Issues ==
State Representative Dennis Paul, before he took office, was among those who worked with community leaders to clean up the bayou before the United States Environmental Protection Agency ordered a national solution to what Paul otherwise viewed as "a local problem."

== See also ==
- List of rivers of Texas
