= El Orcoquisac Archeological District =

Historic district in Texas, United States

- Orcoquisac Archeological District
- U.S. National Register of Historic Places
- U.S. Historic district
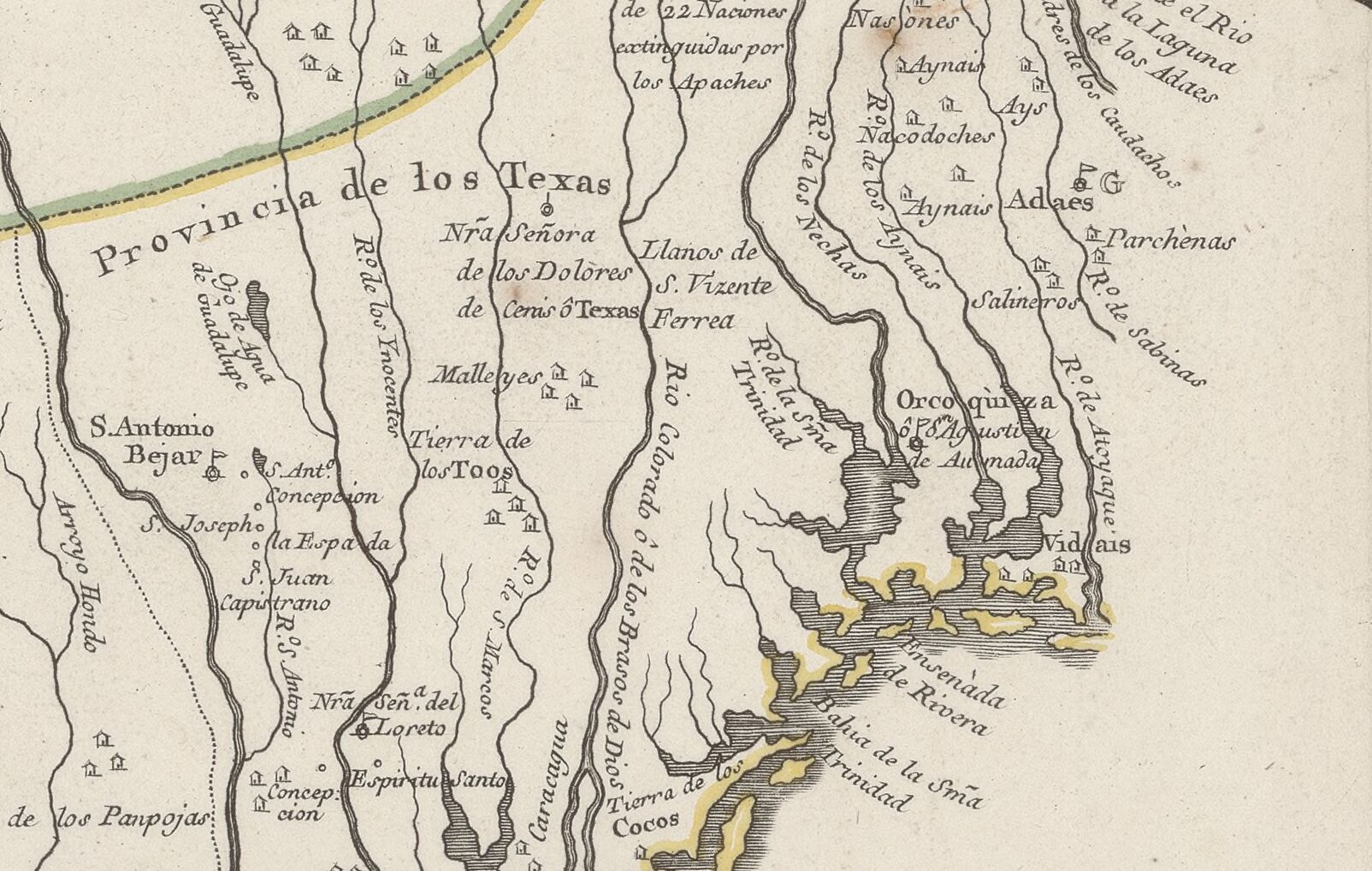
- 1768 map of the spanish Texas Province

- Location within Texas Location within the United States
- Nearest city: Wallisville, Texas
- Coordinates: 29°50′8″N 94°44′31″W
- Area: 510 acres (210 ha)
- NRHP reference No.: 71000925
- Added to NRHP: July 14, 1971

El Orcoquisac Archeological District is a registered U.S. historic site located near Galveston Bay in present-day Wallisville, Texas. The site preserves an important Spanish presidio and trading center as well as an important settlement for the Akokisa and Bidai tribes that once inhabited the area.

Frenchmen, led by Joseph Blancpain and engaged in fur and hide trading with the tribes, had operated in the area near the mouth of the Trinity River in the early 18th century even though the area was claimed by the Spanish as part of the Texas province. Alarmed by this, the Spanish drove out the French and, in 1756, established a presidio known as San Augustín de Ahumada at the El Orcoquisac site. It was named after the Vicerroy of New Spain Agustín de Ahumada, 2nd Marquess of Amarillas. Within the presidio, a Roman Catholic mission known as Nuestra Señora de la Luz was also established. The Spanish post was never as successful in fur trading as Blancpain's operation. The stablishment of the Spanish Louisiana in 1762 resulted in the presidio garrison moved elsewhere and the site was gradually abandoned in the later 18th century.

The site was rediscovered by the amateur historian John V. Clay in 1965 and was added to the National Register of Historic Places in 1972.

== See also ==
- History of the Galveston Bay Area
