= Independence Heights Residential Historic District =

Historic district in Texas, United States

- U.S. National Register of Historic Places
- U.S. Historic district
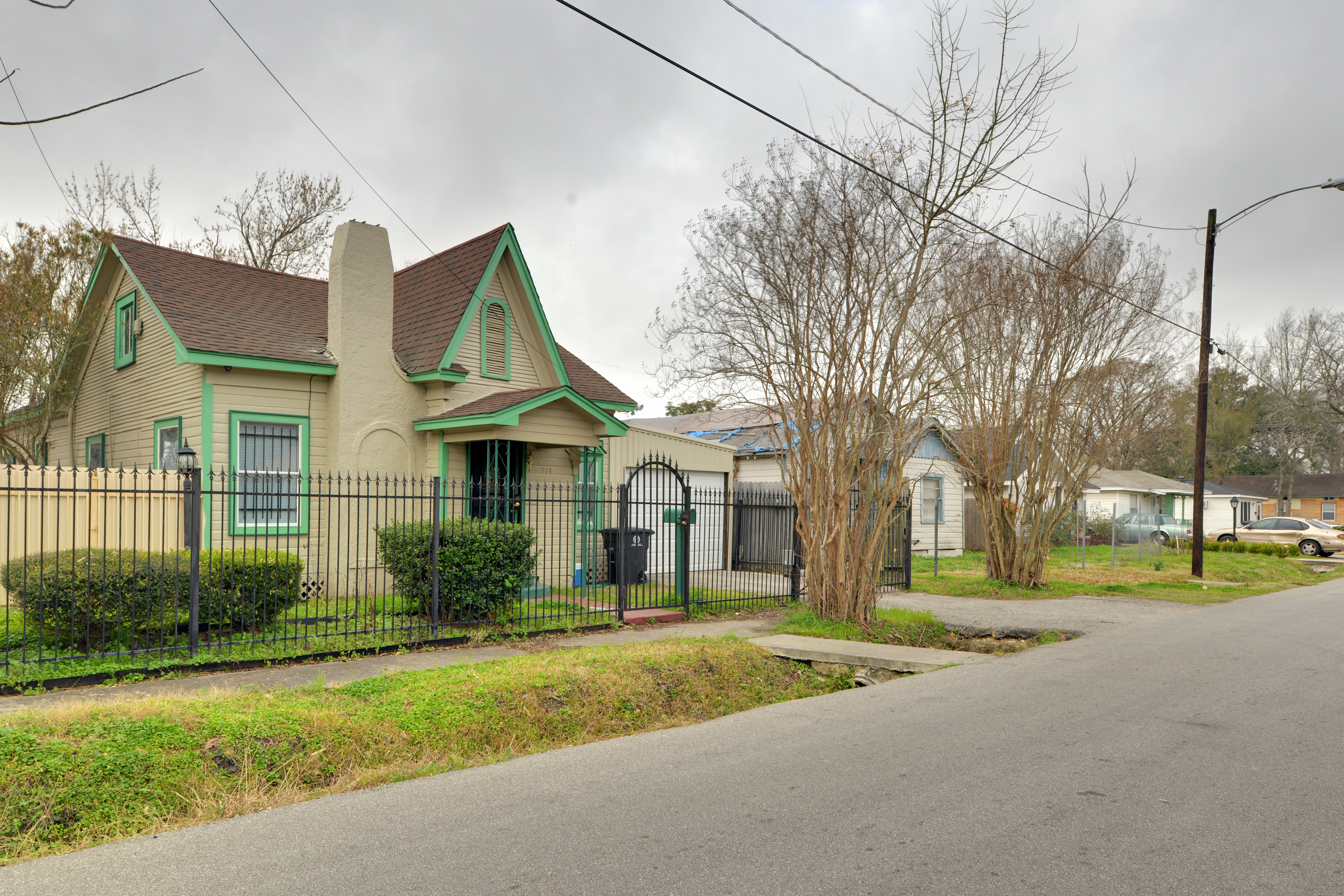
- 34th Street in 2011

- Location within Texas Location within the United States
- Location: Roughly bounded by N. Yale and E. 34th Sts., and I-610, Houston, Texas
- Coordinates: 29°48′54″N 95°23′45″W
- Area: 70 acres (28 ha)
- Built: 1910
- Architect: Multiple
- Architectural style: Bungalow/Craftsman
- MPS: Independence Heights MPS
- NRHP reference No.: 97000542
- Added to NRHP: June 4, 1997

The Independence Heights Residential Historic District is a 70 acres (28 ha) historic district in the Independence Heights neighborhood of Houston, Texas which was listed on the National Register of Historic Places in 1997.

The district is roughly bounded by N. Yale St. on the west, E. 34th St. on the north, N. Columbia St. on the east, and the I-610 on the south. It included 125 contributing buildings.

== See also ==
- National Register of Historic Places listings in outer Harris County, Texas
