= Armand Bayou Nature Center =

Urban preserve in Texas, United States

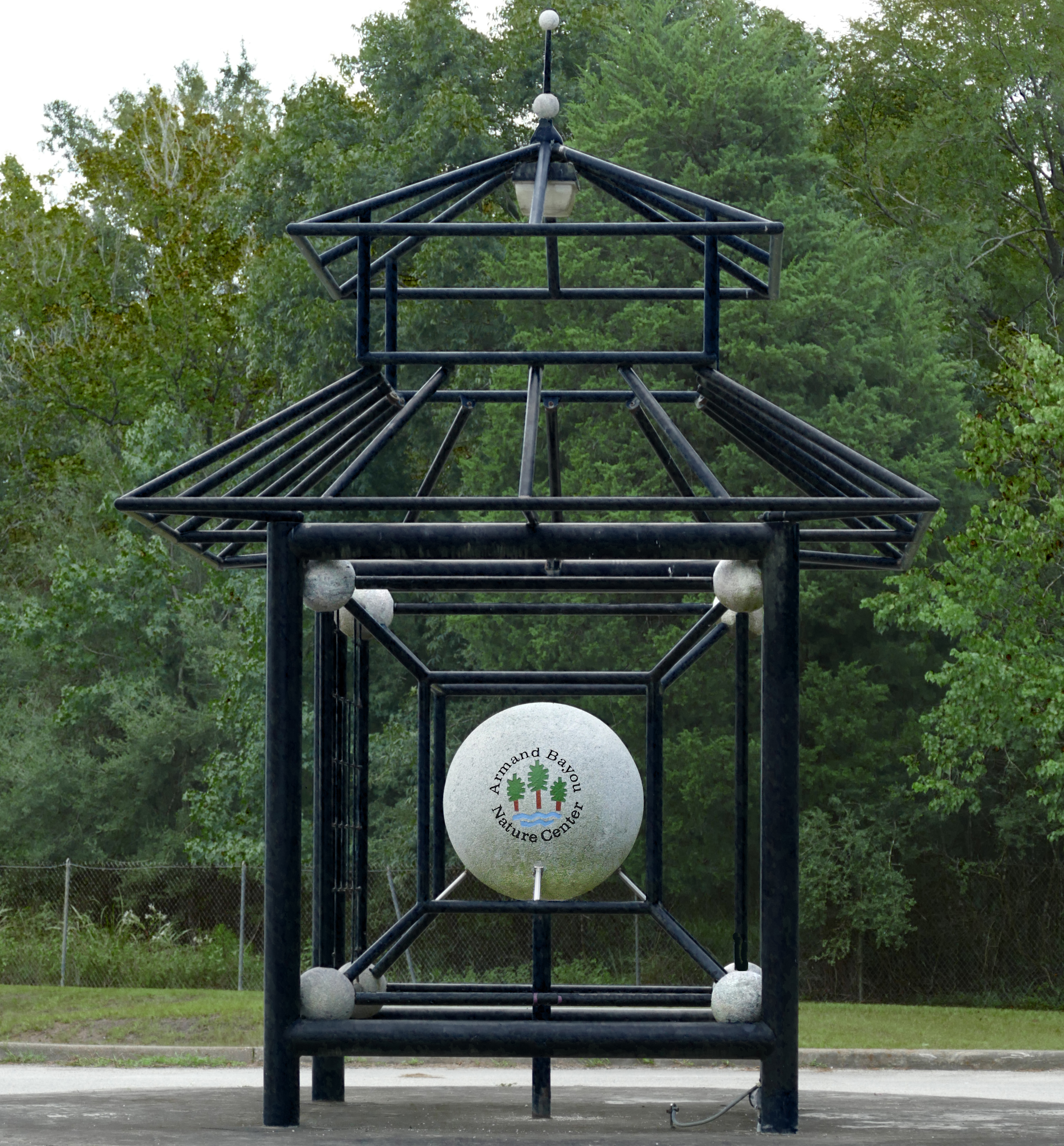
- Interactive map of Armand Bayou Nature Center
- Location: Clear Lake Area, Houston-Sugar Land-Baytown MSA, US
- Nearest city: Pasadena, Texas, Houston
- Coordinates: 29°35′43″N 95°05′55″W
- Governing body: Harris County, Texas
- Website: https://www.abnc.org/

Armand Bayou Nature Center is an urban preserve located in Pasadena, between the Johnson Space Center and the Bayport Industrial District. The 4,000-acre (16 km^{2}) nature center is the largest urban wilderness preserve in the United States.

The nature center is home to more than 370 species of birds, mammals, reptiles, and amphibians. Over 220 species of birds reside or rely on the center as a safe resting-place on their migratory journeys. White-tailed deer, red-shouldered hawk, opossum, crow, armadillo, coyote, raccoon, American alligator, tricolored heron and the rare purple martin can be found at the center and surrounding areas throughout the year.

Armand Bayou Nature Center lies along the Central Flyway, the largest migratory bird route in North America. The center is part of the Great Texas Coastal Birding Trail and one of the coastal preserves designated under the Texas Coastal Preserve Program of the Texas Parks and Wildlife Department.

== History ==
The Armand Bayou area was once occupied by Native Americans, as evidenced by archaeological excavations that uncovered arrowheads, flints, and pottery which identify it as a campsite for nomadic tribes such as the Attakapa, Cohuilletan, and Karankawa. They likely hunted and fished in the area until the arrival of European settlers during the mid-19th century.

The area was originally called the Middle Bayou and was settled by a small group of families during the mid-19th century. The settlers lived by hunting, fishing and growing produce, then selling it at the markets. At one point, a plantation existed on the banks of the bayou near Mud Lake called Killkare. Later residents of the Middle Bayou such as oilman Jim West took steps to ensure the land was protected and preserved by purchasing the homes owned by the early white settlers and protecting them as a game preserve. West owned 28,000 acres of land surrounding the bayou until 1930. The Humble Oil and Refining Company, now ExxonMobil, purchased the land for its natural gas and oil resources for $8,500,000 plus royalties.

In 1962, 15,000 acres for residential development and 7,250 acres for industrial development were placed under the control of the Friendswood Developmental Company, a subsidiary of Humble Oil. Residential real estate development began in 1962, when the National Aeronautics and Space Administration (NASA) used nearly 1700 acres of the West Ranch property to establish the Manned Spacecraft Center. After this came the development of Bay Area Boulevard in 1967, which cut through the middle of the Middle Bayou and became more accessible to the public.

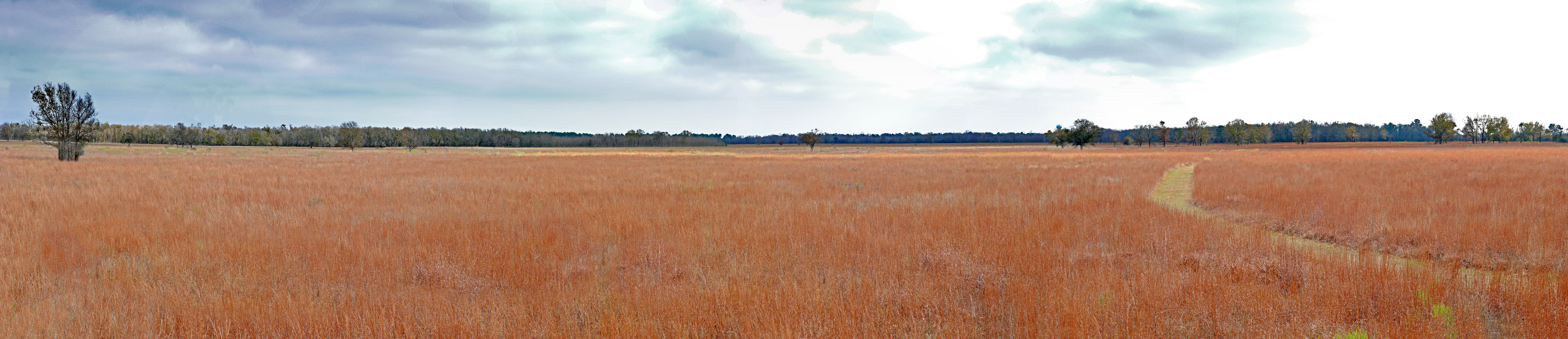
Expanse of Prairie tallgrass at Armand Bayou Nature Center

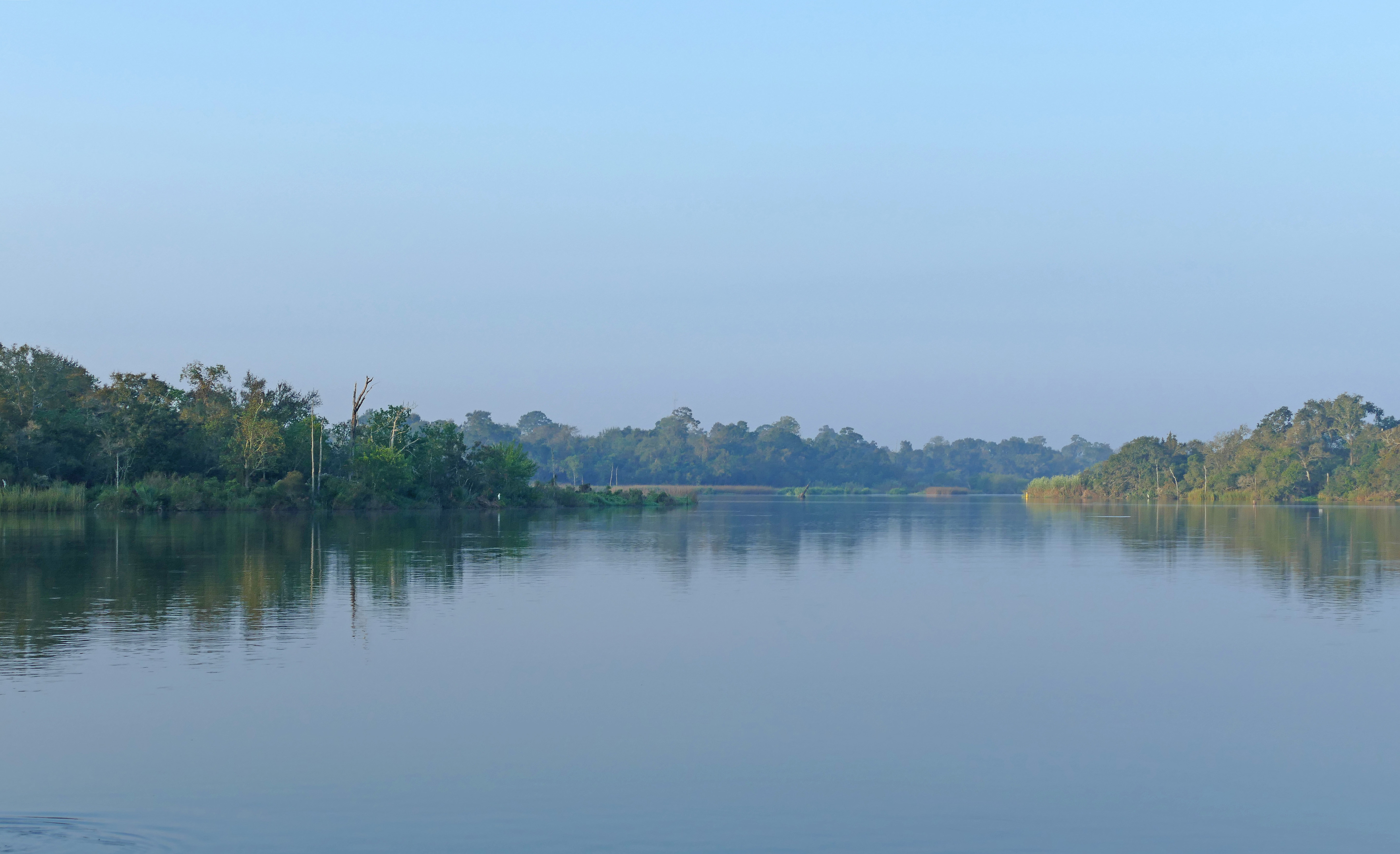
Morning on Armand Bayou at the Nature Center

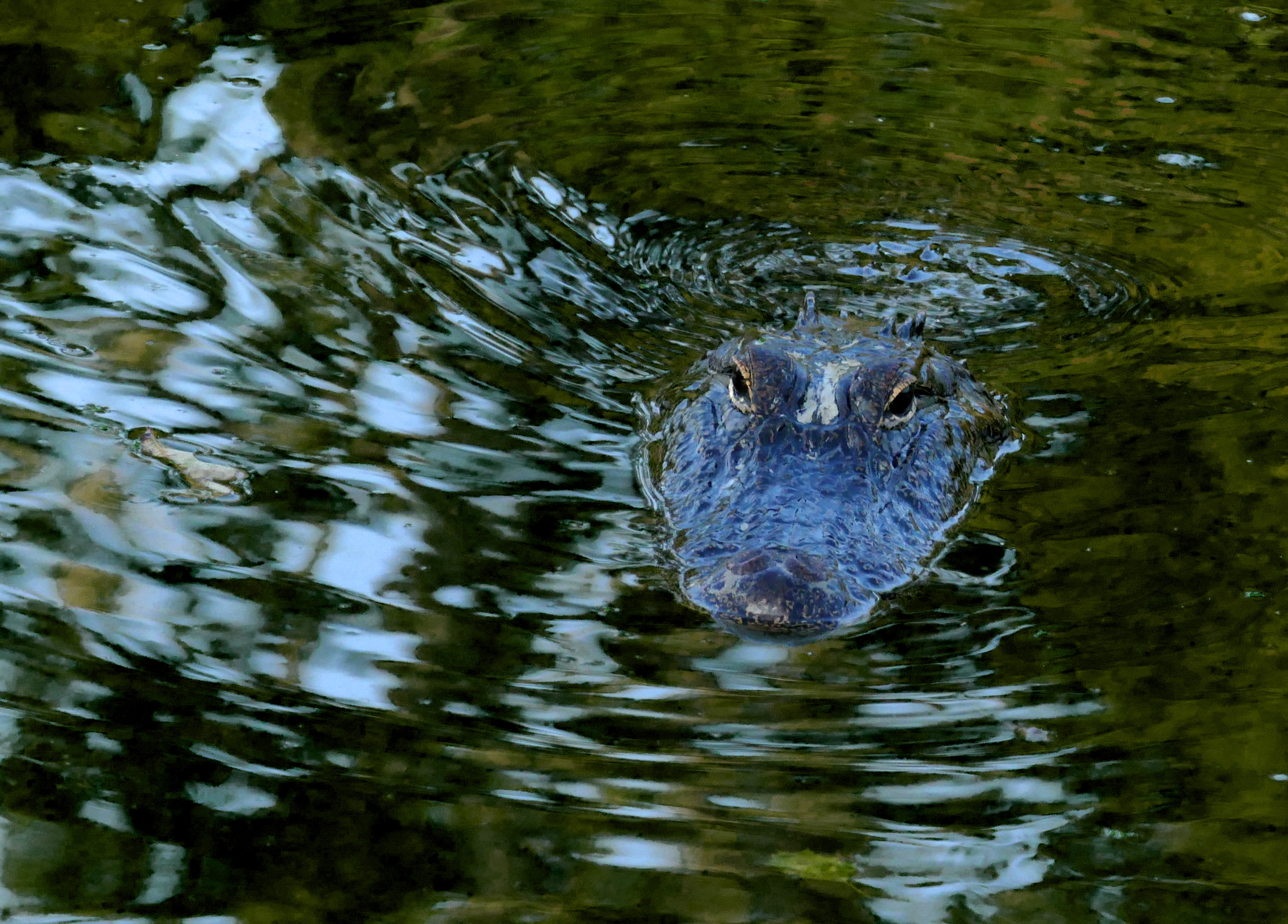
One of 370 species of fauna at Armand Bayou Nature Center

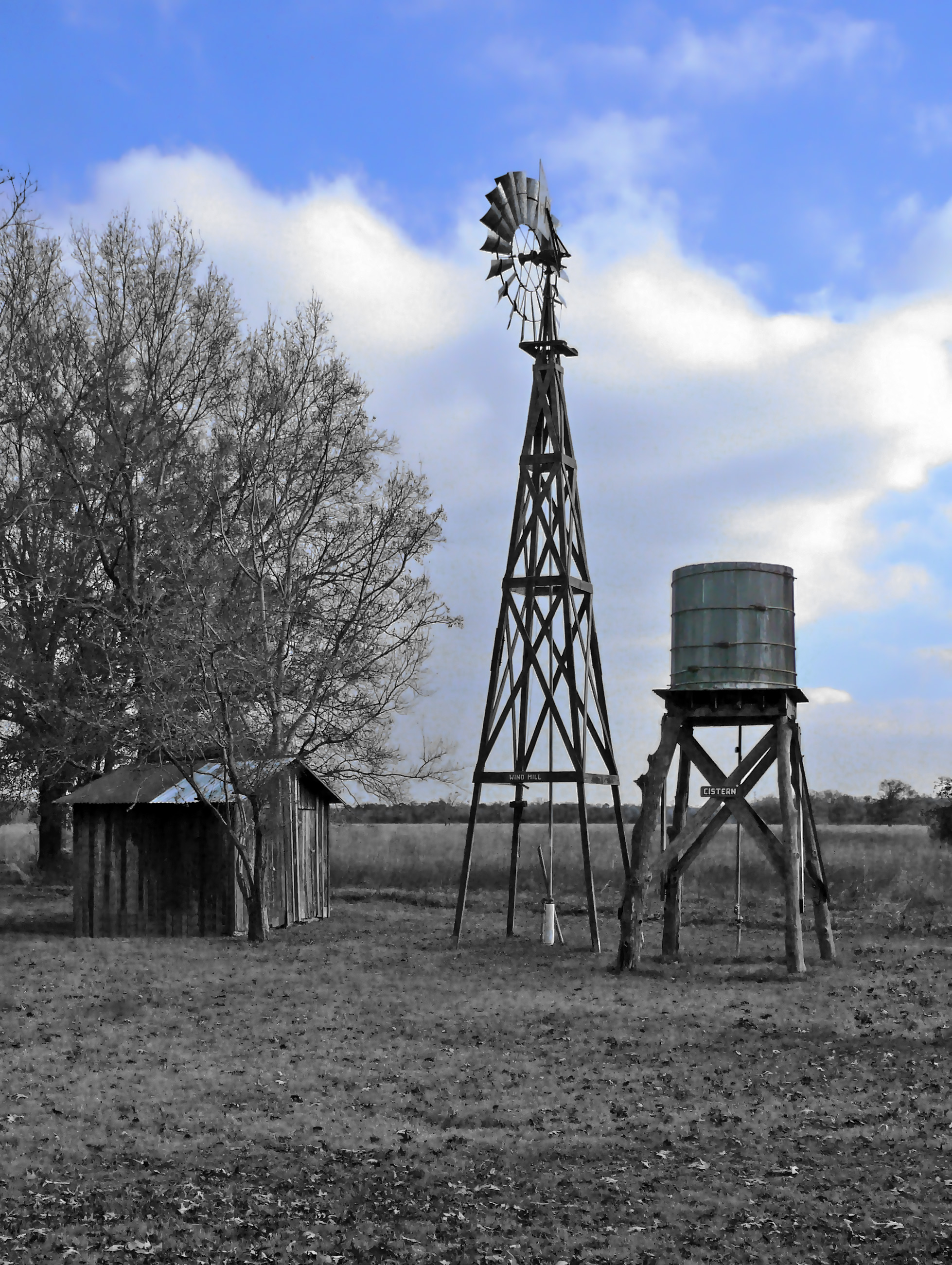
Windmill and cistern in transplanted early Texas farm at Armand Bayou Nature Center

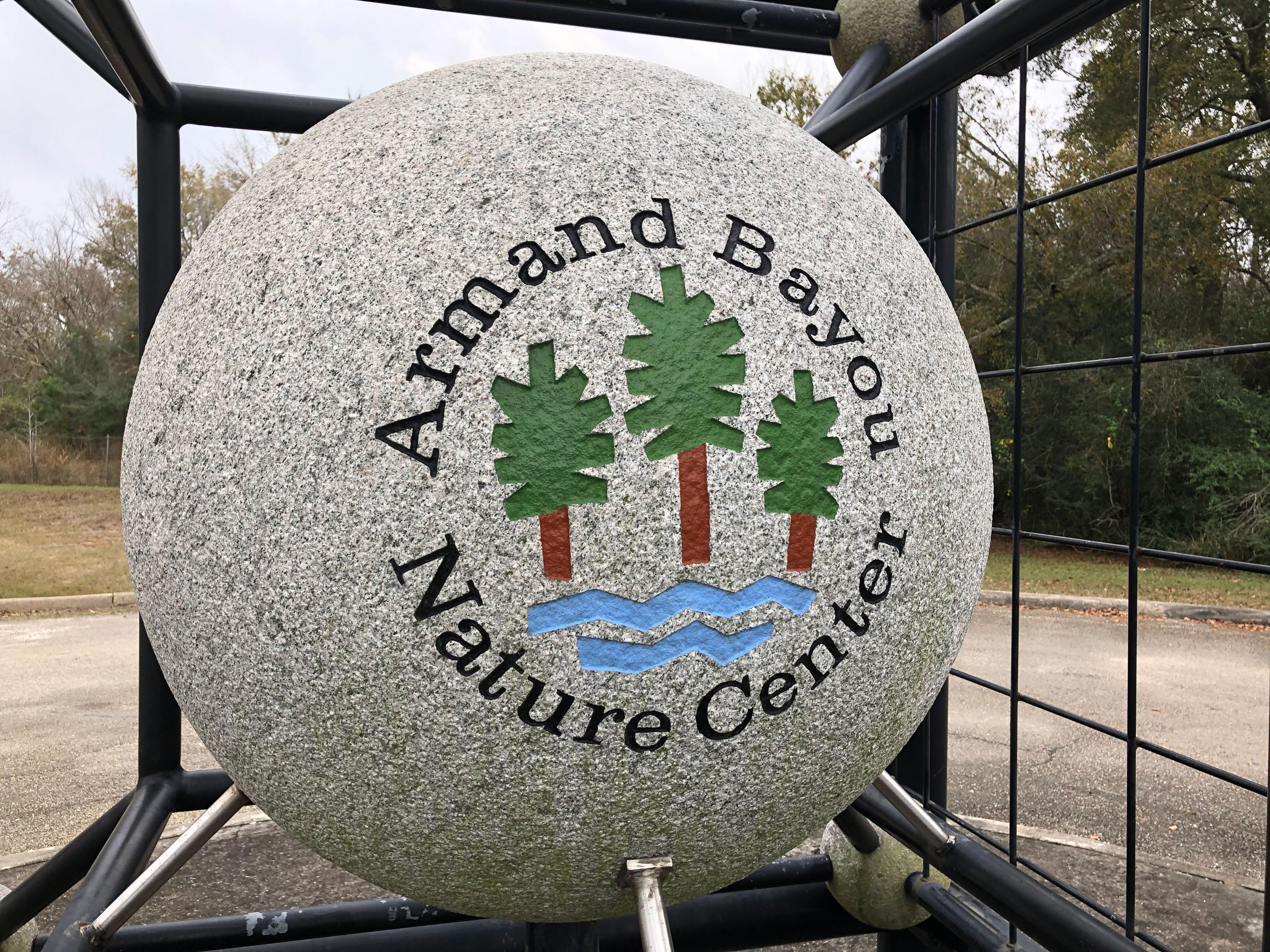
Armand bayou nature center entrance

Local farmer Jimmy Martyn owned 28 acres of land that stood in the way of residential development, refusing a $500,000 offer from Friendswood until his death in 1964, when his heirs sold the property to Friendswood for development. The Armand Bayou Nature Center now houses a re-creation of a 19th century farm named Martyn Farm in his honor.

Much of the Bayou remained natural, but the active preservation of the Bayou was sparked by the murder of Armand Yramategui, a leader in environmental preservation of Houston during the 1960s. Although Yramategui only visited the Middle Bayou a handful of times, the bayou was renamed to Armand Bayou in his memory after his tragic murder in a mugging on the Southwest Freeway in 1970. Yramategui, concerned about the increasing urban growth around Armand Bayou, worked to have the land remain a wilderness.

Following Yramategui's death, conservationists worked hard against Friendswood Development Co. to preserve the Bayou. Biological surveys were conducted by biologist Norman Waldo from Rice University, who concluded the land would be ideal for nesting birds to remain indefinitely. Victor Emanuel of the Audubon Society said the region was "like a centerpiece on a table, it enhances the whole area." Lawrence Dexter of the Texas Conservation Council said "[it] is important to preserve the vicinity of a city to show that the city and natural areas are compatible." Fellow environmentalist and friend Hana Ginzbarg became the bayou's advocate for the Bayou Preservation Association. Her activism and work through the Bayou Preservation Association, Outdoor Nature Club, and other organizations was instrumental in creating the Nature Center.

Founded in 1974, the center consists of a boardwalk through forest and marshes, live animal displays, bison and prairie platforms and butterfly gardens. The center also includes the "Martyn", "Karankawa", "Marsh", "Lady Bird" (named after Lady Bird Johnson), and "Prairie" nature trails that allow visitors to see forest, prairie, marsh and natural bayou habitats once common in the Houston and Galveston region.

== See also ==
- Baytown Nature Center
- Great Texas Coastal Birding Trail
- Texas City Prairie Preserve
- Wildlife refuge
