= Goose Creek Oil Field =

Oil field in the U.S. state of Texas

Coordinates: 29°42′36.06″N 94°58′59.13″W

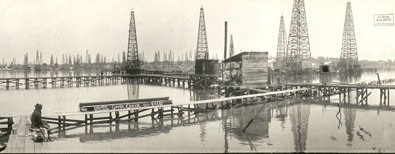
Goose Creek Field, c. 1919

The Goose Creek Oil Field is a large oil field in Baytown, Texas, on Galveston Bay. Discovered in 1903, and reaching maximum production in 1918 after a series of spectacular gushers, it was one of the fields that contributed to the Texas Oil Boom of the early 20th century. The field was also the location of the first offshore wells in Texas, and the second group of offshore wells in the United States. Consequences of the development of the Goose Creek field included an economic boom and associated influx of workers, the founding and fast growth of Baytown, and the building of the adjacent Baytown Refinery, which is now the 2nd largest oil refinery in the United States with a capacity of 584,000 barrels per day. The field remains active, having produced over 150 million barrels (24,000,000 m^{3}) of oil in its 100-year history.

The Goose Creek field is also the first place where subsidence of overlying terrain was attributed to the removal of oil from underneath. On the Goose Creek field, subsidence has damaged houses, roads, and businesses, and much of the oil field that was on land in the early years of its development is now submerged in Tabbs Bay. Subsidence-induced motion along faults on the field also caused the only earthquake of local origin ever felt in the Houston area.

== Setting ==
The Goose Creek field is located along the northern shoreline of Tabbs Bay, an arm of Galveston Bay, at the point where Goose Creek exits to the sea. It is directly south of the city of Baytown, and about 25 miles (40 km) east of downtown Houston. Elevations on the field range from approximately 30 feet (9.1 m) at the highest well locations next to developed parts of Baytown, on the north side of the field, to submerged and partially submerged areas within Tabbs Bay itself. Much of the field is close to sea level. The total productive area of the field, including the submerged portion, is approximately 3,470 acres (14.0 km^{2}).

Alexander Drive, a spur of Texas State Highway 146, runs through the field. West of Goose Creek it rejoins Highway 146 to go over Tabbs Bay on the Fred Hartman Bridge.

== Geology ==
The oil field is an accumulation of petroleum in sediment overlying a deep salt dome, one of several such fields in the Gulf of Mexico region. It was the first oil field to be found in a deep rather than a shallow salt dome, and its discovery led to the search for others like it; the finds that resulted were some of the largest oil fields in the United States. The sedimentary layers over the dome are themselves arched into a shape conforming to the underlying dome, so the structure forms a perfect trap for hydrocarbons which would otherwise migrate to the surface. The field contains 30 separate pools or producing horizons, ranging in depth from 800 to 4,500 feet (1,400 m). The oil-bearing strata under the salt dome consist of porous sands with some interspersed clay.

The Goose Creek field is the first place where subsidence of the land over the oil field was definitively attributed to the extraction of petroleum. Subsidence over the Goose Creek field is well documented and particularly dramatic; parts of the field which were once above-water are now wholly or partially submerged, and the area of subsidence almost exactly conforms to the boundary of the productive region. The connection between extraction and subsidence was first recognized by geologists Wallace Everette Pratt and D.W. Johnson, who published their findings in a 1926 paper. By this year, after about ten years of active pumping, most of the productive area of the field had subsided three feet, and the submerging of the facilities had already become obvious to field operators.

Along with the subsidence, surface faulting has been observed, and motion along these faults – although minimal compared to motion along faults in areas in which the seismic activity is due to tectonic forces – has been sufficient to damage buildings and be felt in the local area. One of the faults in the Goose Creek area, first observed in 1925, shows a vertical displacement of 0.4 meter, along a length of over 700 meters.

Subsidence of land due to either oil or groundwater extraction is now widely recognized, and the Gulf Coast is one of many places in the world in which it has become a serious problem. In the present day, oil fields underneath sensitive areas, such as cities, are usually re-pressurized with water or gas to prevent the land above them from collapsing into the vacated space.

== History, operations, and production ==
Bubbles of methane gas coming up in the shallow water along the shoreline of Galveston Bay alerted early prospectors in 1903 to the possibility of an oil field in the area. The first attempts to develop the field followed shortly, but none of the wells produced economic quantities of oil; indeed it was not until 1908 that oil was found at all, and the Producers Oil Company drilled 20 separate times in a failed attempt to create a well that flowed sufficiently to turn a profit. The American Petroleum Company had better luck, and their 8,000-barrel (1,300 m^{3})-per-day gusher on August 23, 1916 brought in the field. The subsequent fast influx of workers and equipment engendered a pair of boomtowns – Pelly and Goose Creek – adjacent to the field. In 1917 Ross S. Sterling, president of Humble Oil Company, chose to build a refinery on vacant land just northwest of the oil field, reorganizing his firm as the Humble Oil and Refining Company in order to accomplish the task. Humble Oil would go on to become Exxon, and the Baytown Refinery would eventually become the largest refinery in the United States. In addition, in 1919 Sterling arranged for the construction of Baytown on land adjacent to his new refinery.

High oil prices also fueled the field's fast development. The First World War had caused a run-up in the price, which reached $1.35 per barrel by 1917. During that year the average well was producing over 1,000 barrels per day (160 m^{3}/d), and the biggest gusher also occurred during 1917 – a well drilled by the Simms-Sinclair Company which spewed 35,000 barrels per day (5,600 m^{3}/d), remaining out of control for several days.

The Goose Creek Oil Field was the location of the first offshore wells in Texas. They were drilled in shallow water from piers like the ones in on the Summerland field in Summerland, California twenty years before, which were the first in the world. Due to subsidence many of the wells which were originally on land are now wholly or partially submerged.

Because of the sinking of the land containing the field, the State of Texas sued the Humble Oil Co. for rights to the field, as technically the field had ceased to be on land but had joined the state water bottomlands, which were not subject to private ownership. Along with title to the field and the various private parcels within it, the State sought to collect the revenues from oil and gas produced since the land went underwater. The State lost the suit, with the court ruling that the subsidence was caused by the extraction of oil, and was therefore an "act of Man" rather than a natural event. Humble Oil continued to produce from the field.

Parts of the field have subsided nine feet from the original ground surface elevation since production began, while subsidence in adjacent Baytown has reached approximately six feet. Not all of the subsidence in the field and adjacent areas is due to oil withdrawal; some is from pumping of groundwater from water wells.

Peak production of the field had been reached by 1918, before the street grid for Baytown had even been drawn up. In that year the field produced 8,923,635 barrels (1,418,744.6 m^{3}) of oil (more than the current estimated recoverable reserve). Some of the infrastructure improvements built during this year were the railroad connecting the oil field to the site of the future refinery, and pipelines crossing under the bay connecting storage tanks to the mainland. On May 24, 1919, a tropical storm destroyed over 1,450 of the flimsy wooden oil derricks erected on the field. After the production peak in 1918, field output began a slow decline, dropping from the high of 25,000 barrels per day (4,000 m^{3}/d) in 1918 to only 1,100 in 1943. Production increased again in the 1960s with the development of water injection technologies, but then began falling off as the field became depleted.

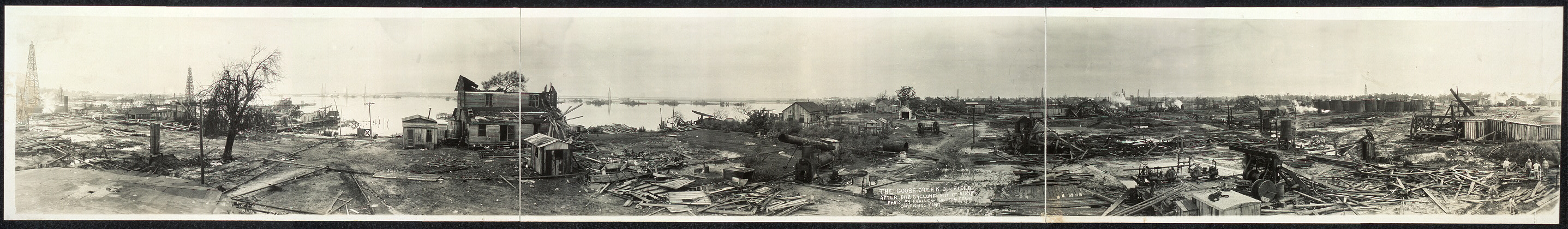
Panorama of the field after the 1919 hurricane destroyed over 1,400 oil derricks

The field's major operators in 1984 were Exxon, Chevron, Mobil, Monsanto, Coastal, and Enderli Oil. Many of the major oil companies began divesting their onshore operations in the U.S. around this time, selling them to independents, as opportunities overseas became more attractive. The field changed hands several times, going to Wood Energy Corp. in 1996, and then to Texas American Resources in 1999. They operated the field until 2006, at which time Bakersfield, California-based Foothills-Resources bought the field. Foothills immediately began a remapping and 3D-seismic survey program to identify new development opportunities. At this time the daily production from the field was around 820 barrels (130 m^{3}) of oil per day; Foothills-Resources claimed that the field retained 5.1 million barrels (810,000 m^{3}) of proven reserves. In late 2007 they put in new wells, but the entire field was shut down for two weeks in September 2008 due to Hurricane Ike, the eye of which passed directly over the field, and destroyed or damaged considerable oil and gas infrastructure in the northwestern Gulf of Mexico. In spite of the direct hit by Ike, and the field being right at sea level or in shallow water, subject to storm surge, little long-term damage occurred; nevertheless the field was inoperative for two weeks. On February 11, 2009, Foothills filed for Chapter 11 bankruptcy in the bankruptcy court for Delaware.
