= Wooster, Baytown, Texas =

Unincorporated community in Harris County, Texas

Coordinates: 29.749°N 95.032°W

Wooster is an area of Baytown, Texas, United States that used to be a distinct unincorporated community in Harris County.

Wooster is named after Quincy Adams Wooster, from Monona County, Iowa. He purchased over 1,000 acres in 1892 and founded the township of Wooster, which included the peninsula that would include what would become known as the Brownwood subdivision. Most of Brownwood was condemned by FEMA after Hurricane Alicia destroyed all but a few of the homes there in August 1983. Most of the subdivision is now the Baytown Nature Center.

The community housed a temporary holding camp for German prisoners of war during World War II.

== Education ==
Wooster is within the Goose Creek Consolidated Independent School District.

== Wooster Today ==
In the late 1990s Exxon Mobil began purchasing former company homes in the Wooster area. The Wooster area and many residences had adjoining property with the oil refinery's property. The oil company purchased the homes to make a protective greenbelt around the perimeter of the plant and to prevent future litigation if new homeowners reported medical conditions that might be related to plant operations. While residents were not forced to move, most of them have taken the buyout. Very few houses remain in the area today.

On January 24, 2023, a large and intense EF3 tornado struck the community.
