= Baytown, Texas =

- City
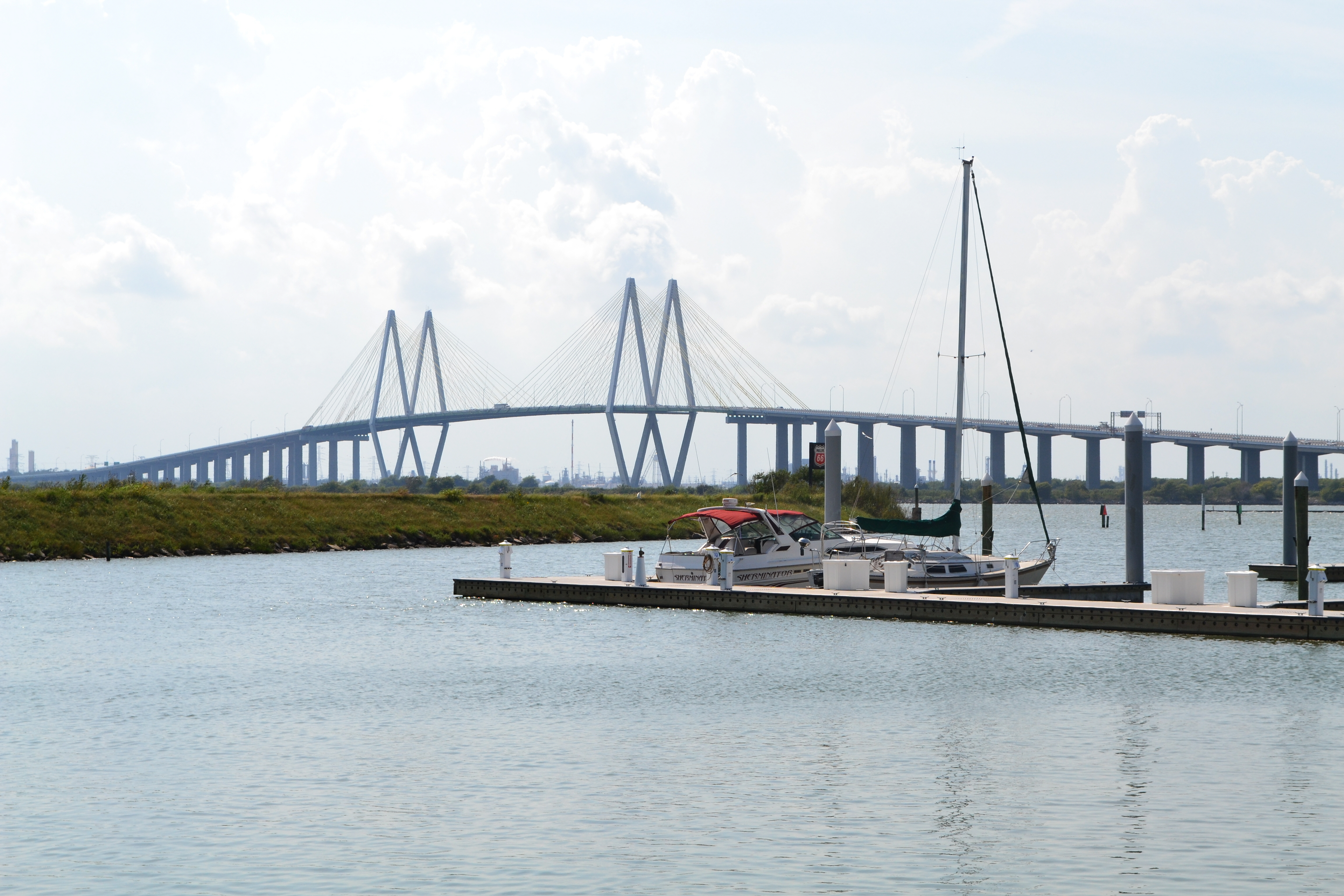
- Fred Hartman Bridge

- Flag
- Interactive map of Baytown, Texas
- Location in Texas Baytown (the United States) Baytown (North America)
- Coordinates: 29°44′38″N 94°57′57″W
- Country: United States
- State: Texas
- Counties: Harris, Chambers
- Congressional District: 36th
- Incorporated: January 24, 1948

Government
  - Type: Council–manager

Area
  - Total: 37.99 sq mi (98.39 km^{2})
  - Land: 36.91 sq mi (95.59 km^{2})
  - Water: 1.08 sq mi (2.80 km^{2})
- Elevation: 23 ft (7.0 m)

Population (2020)
  - Total: 83,701
  - Density: 2,091.6/sq mi (807.57/km^{2})
  - Metro: 7,206,841 (6th)
- Demonym: Baytonian
- Time zone: UTC-6 (CST)
  - Summer (DST): UTC-5 (CDT)
- ZIP codes: 77520-77523
- Area codes: 281, 713, 832, 346, 621
- FIPS code: 48-06128
- GNIS feature ID: 2409801
- Website: www.baytown.org

Baytown is a city in the U.S. state of Texas, within Harris and Chambers counties. Located in the metropolitan statistical area of Greater Houston, it lies on the northern side of the Galveston Bay complex near the outlets of the San Jacinto River and Buffalo Bayou. It is the sixth-largest city within this metropolitan area and seventh largest community (including The Woodlands CDP). Major highways serving the city include State Highway 99, State Highway 146 and Interstate 10. At the 2020 U.S. census, Baytown had a population of 83,701, and it had an estimated population of 84,324 in 2022.

== History ==
White American settlers first arrived in the now-Baytown area in 1822. One of its earliest settlers was Nathaniel Lynch, who set up a ferry crossing at the junction of the San Jacinto River and Buffalo Bayou. The still-operating ferry service is known as the Lynchburg Ferry. Other early settlers of Baytown included William Scott, one of Stephen F. Austin's Old Three Hundred, and Ashbel Smith, who owned a plantation in the area.

The city now known as Baytown was originally three separate towns. The first of these was Goose Creek, named for the bayou of the same name where Canada geese wintered and whose name is still reflected in the area's Goose Creek school district, whose establishment dates back to before 1850. With the discovery of the Goose Creek Oil Field, the rival communities of Pelly in the late 1910s, and East Baytown in the early 1920s, developed as early boomtowns. The "East" in East Baytown was later dropped because it was west of Goose Creek.

Serious talk of merging the three cities began shortly after World War I, but the community of Baytown was opposed to this idea. However, in 1947, the three cities finally agreed to consolidate. The citizens settled on the name Baytown for the new combined city. Baytown as it is known today was officially founded January 24, 1948.

In 1916, the Humble Oil and Refining Company, founded by one-time Texas governor Ross S. Sterling and his associates, in developing the Goose Creek Oil Field, built the first offshore drilling operation in Texas and the second in the United States. The company later built the Baytown Refinery, which would become one of the largest Exxon refineries in the world. Since then, many other refineries have been built in the area. Exxon-Mobil is still one of the major employers in the city and now runs over 10 plants in the area including a newly announced 2 billion dollar expansion to its chemical facilities in 2019.

Following the discovery of oil nearby, the population of Baytown and the tri-cities boomed. Many immigrants arrived in Baytown, among them a number of Jewish families who founded a synagogue, K’nesseth Israel, in 1930.

Steel manufacturing in Baytown began in 1970 when United States Steel opened the Texas Works near the city. The plant was officially closed in July 1986, due to a poor economic climate and the decline of American steel in the 1980s. The mill was later purchased by Jindal Steel and now operates as JSW Steel USA, Inc.

== Geography ==
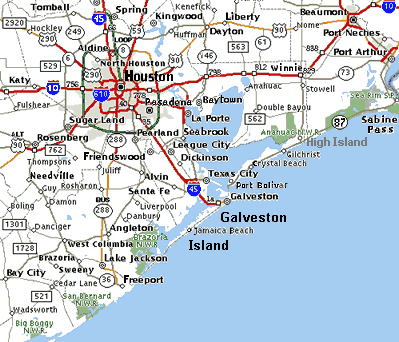
Baytown connects to I-10 via State Highways 99 and 146, and the Fred Hartman Bridge connects SH 146 southwest to La Porte.

The city of Baytown is located at the mouth of the San Jacinto River on Galveston Bay, 26 miles (42 km) by road east of Houston. According to the United States Census Bureau, the city has a total area of 36.5 square miles (94.6 km^{2}), of which 35.4 square miles (91.8 km^{2}) is land and 1.1 square miles (2.8 km^{2}), 2.92%, is covered by water.

Baytown is located on the Gulf coastal plain, and its vegetation is classified as temperate grassland and marshes. The municipalities have been built on reclaimed marshes, swamps, and prairies, which are all still visible in undeveloped parts of the Galveston Bay area. Baytown is bordered by water on three sides. Along the south and west is Galveston Bay. On the east is Cedar Bayou. The city is roughly bordered along the north by Interstate 10. Portions of the city to the east of Cedar Bayou lie in Chambers County.

Flatness of the local terrain and proximity to the bay have made flooding a recurring problem for the area. Baytown and surrounding communities once relied on groundwater for its needs, but severe land subsidence has forced much the city to turn to ground-level water sources.

=== Geology ===
The land beneath Baytown consists of layers of sand and clay to great depths. These layers were created by millennia of river-borne sediments which gradually incorporated plant and animal matter, creating the petroleum deposits for which the Gulf Coast is now known.

The region around the city has numerous faults, many considered active, but none have produced significant earthquakes in recorded history. These faults tend to move at a smooth rate in what is termed "fault creep", which reduces the risk of an earthquake. The one significant earthquake that has been reported in the area was the result of an underground water and petroleum extraction.

=== Climate ===
Baytown's climate is classified as humid subtropical (Cfa in Köppen climate classification system). Spring supercell thunderstorms sometimes create tornadoes (but not to the extent found in Tornado Alley). Prevailing winds from the south and southeast bring heat from the deserts of Mexico and moisture from the Gulf of Mexico.

Summer temperatures typically have highs near 90 °F (32 °C) though higher temperatures are not uncommon. The city's proximity to the bay and the winds that it generates moderate the area's temperatures and ease the effects of the humidity, creating a more pleasant climate than inland communities like Houston. Winters in the area are temperate with typical January high of 61 °F (16 °C) and lows are near 42 °F (6 °C). Snowfall is rare. Baytown’s annual rainfall averages are around or exceed 64 inches (160 cm), making it one of the wetter cities of the lower 48.

Excessive ozone levels can occur due to industrial activities; nearby Houston is ranked among the most ozone-polluted cities in the United States. The industries located along the ship channel and the bay are a major cause of the pollution.

Hurricanes are a substantial concern during the fall season. Though Galveston Island and the Bolivar Peninsula provide some shielding, Baytown still faces more danger than Houston and other inland communities, particularly because of storm surge, as well as severe land subsidence in some low-lying areas of town due to excess pumping of groundwater in the 1960s (see Brownwood subdivision) by area refineries and municipalities. Hurricanes Carla (1961), Alicia (1983), Ike (2008), and Harvey (2017) were the four most damaging hurricanes to affect Baytown.

Climate data for Baytown, Texas (1991–2020 normals, extremes 1983–present)
Month	Jan	Feb	Mar	Apr	May	Jun	Jul	Aug	Sep	Oct	Nov	Dec	Year
Record high °F (°C)	83 (28)	86 (30)	90 (32)	93 (34)	96 (36)	102 (39)	102 (39)	107 (42)	109 (43)	94 (34)	88 (31)	84 (29)	109 (43)
Mean maximum °F (°C)	76.7 (24.8)	79.5 (26.4)	82.8 (28.2)	86.3 (30.2)	90.6 (32.6)	95.5 (35.3)	97.3 (36.3)	98.5 (36.9)	95.2 (35.1)	90.4 (32.4)	84.0 (28.9)	79.1 (26.2)	99.6 (37.6)
Mean daily maximum °F (°C)	62.9 (17.2)	66.4 (19.1)	72.1 (22.3)	77.5 (25.3)	84.2 (29.0)	89.2 (31.8)	91.5 (33.1)	92.3 (33.5)	88.5 (31.4)	81.6 (27.6)	71.4 (21.9)	64.5 (18.1)	78.5 (25.8)
Daily mean °F (°C)	52.1 (11.2)	55.8 (13.2)	62.0 (16.7)	68.0 (20.0)	75.4 (24.1)	80.9 (27.2)	83.1 (28.4)	83.3 (28.5)	78.8 (26.0)	70.6 (21.4)	60.7 (15.9)	54.1 (12.3)	68.7 (20.4)
Mean daily minimum °F (°C)	41.4 (5.2)	45.3 (7.4)	52.0 (11.1)	58.5 (14.7)	66.7 (19.3)	72.7 (22.6)	74.6 (23.7)	74.3 (23.5)	69.0 (20.6)	59.6 (15.3)	50.1 (10.1)	43.6 (6.4)	59.0 (15.0)
Mean minimum °F (°C)	28.4 (−2.0)	32.6 (0.3)	36.2 (2.3)	44.4 (6.9)	54.2 (12.3)	65.9 (18.8)	71.1 (21.7)	70.5 (21.4)	58.4 (14.7)	45.5 (7.5)	35.5 (1.9)	31.2 (−0.4)	26.7 (−2.9)
Record low °F (°C)	17 (−8)	14 (−10)	25 (−4)	30 (−1)	43 (6)	58 (14)	62 (17)	58 (14)	48 (9)	30 (−1)	25 (−4)	7 (−14)	7 (−14)
Average precipitation inches (mm)	4.85 (123)	3.78 (96)	3.94 (100)	4.51 (115)	6.01 (153)	7.08 (180)	5.49 (139)	6.82 (173)	6.41 (163)	6.13 (156)	4.94 (125)	4.77 (121)	64.73 (1,644)
Average snowfall inches (cm)	0.0 (0.0)	0.0 (0.0)	0.0 (0.0)	0.0 (0.0)	0.0 (0.0)	0.0 (0.0)	0.0 (0.0)	0.0 (0.0)	0.0 (0.0)	0.0 (0.0)	0.0 (0.0)	0.0 (0.0)	0.0 (0.0)
Average precipitation days (≥ 0.01 in)	10.6	9.3	9.0	7.9	7.7	10.1	10.1	10.7	9.7	7.1	8.3	10.5	111.0
Average snowy days (≥ 0.1 in)	0.0	0.0	0.0	0.0	0.0	0.0	0.0	0.0	0.0	0.0	0.0	0.0	0.0
Source: NOAA

== Demographics ==
Historical population
Census	Pop.	Note	%±
1950	22,983		—
1960	28,159		22.5%
1970	43,980		56.2%
1980	56,923		29.4%
1990	63,850		12.2%
2000	66,430		4.0%
2010	71,802		8.1%
2020	83,701		16.6%
U.S. Decennial Census; 1850–1900 1910; 1920 1930 1940; 1950 1960 1970; 1980 1990 2000; 2010

Baytown city, Texas – Racial and ethnic composition Note: the US Census treats Hispanic/Latino as an ethnic category. This table excludes Latinos from the racial categories and assigns them to a separate category. Hispanics/Latinos may be of any race.
Race / Ethnicity (NH = Non-Hispanic)	Pop 2000	Pop 2010	Pop 2020	% 2000	% 2010	% 2020
White alone (NH)	33,328	27,803	24,137	50.17%	38.72%	28.84%
Black or African American alone (NH)	8,726	10,759	13,652	13.14%	14.98%	16.32%
Native American or Alaska Native alone (NH)	181	180	233	0.27%	0.25%	0.28%
Asian alone (NH)	634	1,022	1,447	0.95%	1.42%	1.73%
Native Hawaiian or Pacific Islander alone (NH)	32	24	42	0.05%	0.03%	0.05%
Other race alone (NH)	49	132	526	0.07%	0.18%	0.63%
Mixed race or Multiracial (NH)	732	726	2,250	1.10%	1.01%	2.69%
Hispanic or Latino (any race)	22,748	31,156	41,414	34.24%	43.39%	49.48%
Total	66,430	71,802	83,701	100.00%	100.00%	100.00%

The 2020 United States census determined Baytown had a population of 83,701, up from 71,802 people at the 2010 United States census. In 2010, its population density was 2,025.7 inhabitants per square mile (782.1/km^{2}). There were 26,203 housing units at an average density of 802.4 per square mile (309.8/km^{2}) in 2010, and 28,802 housing units in 2019. As of the 2020 United States census, there were 83,701 people, 26,592 households, and 18,169 families residing in the city.

In 2019, the U.S. Census Bureau estimated that the racial and ethnic makeup of the city was 31.8% non-Hispanic white, 17.2% Black or African American, 0.1% American Indian or Alaska Native, 1.8% Asian, 0.1% from some other race, and 2.0% from two or more races. Approximately 47.0% of the local population were Hispanic or Latin American of any race. Of the Hispanic or Latin American population, the largest group was Mexican Americans. At the 2010 U.S. census, the racial and ethnic makeup of the city was 62.9% White, 15.5% African American, 0.6% Native American, 1.5% Asian, 14.42% from other races, and 2.7% from two or more races. Hispanics or Latinos of any race were 43.4% of the population.

Of the 2010 population, 39.2% had children under the age of 18 living with them, 52.9% were married couples living together, 14.2% had a female householder with no husband present, and 27.5% were not families. About 23.0% of all households were made up of individuals, and 8.0% had someone living alone who was 65 years of age or older. The average household size was 2.80 and the average family size was 3.32. The 2019 American Community Survey estimated the average family size declined to 2.83.

In 2019, Baytown's population had a distribution of 95.3 males per 100 females aged 18 and older, and 68.2 males per 100 females aged 65 and older. In 2010 the city's population was distributed as 29.2% under the age of 18, 11.2% from 18 to 24, 29.4% from 25 to 44, 19.5% from 45 to 64, and 10.1% who were 65 years of age or older. The median age was 31 years. For every 100 females, there were 94.4 males. For every 100 females age 18 and over, there were 91.4 males.

The median income for a household in the city was $48,191, and for a family was $45,346 in 2010, and the median income in 2019 was $57,765. Residents of Baytown had a per capita income of $26,978 in 2019, and an estimated 14.0% lived at or below the poverty line. According to 2010's census, males had a median income of $38,039 versus $25,012 for females. The per capita income for the city was $17,641. About 13.0% of families and 15.5% of the population were below the poverty line, including 21.9% of those under age 18 and 9.8% of those age 65 or over.

The median value of owner-occupied housing units was $133,900 in 2019 and the median monthly cost with a mortgage was $1,360. The median cost without a mortgage was $422. Baytown had a median gross rent of $938. In 2010 the American Community Survey determined the median owner-occupied housing unit value at $101,700.

As of 2010, the property crime rate in the community was 4.6% compared to 5.45% for Harris County as a whole. The violent crime rate was 0.5% compared to 1.03% for Harris County.

Christianity is the most prevalent religion in Baytown and the Greater Houston area. The Latin Church's Archdiocese of Galveston-Houston of the Catholic Church is the largest Christian body in the city, followed by Baptists of the Southern Baptist Convention and Texas Baptists, the Assemblies of God USA, and United Methodist Church. Other prominent religions include Judaism and Islam.

== Economy ==
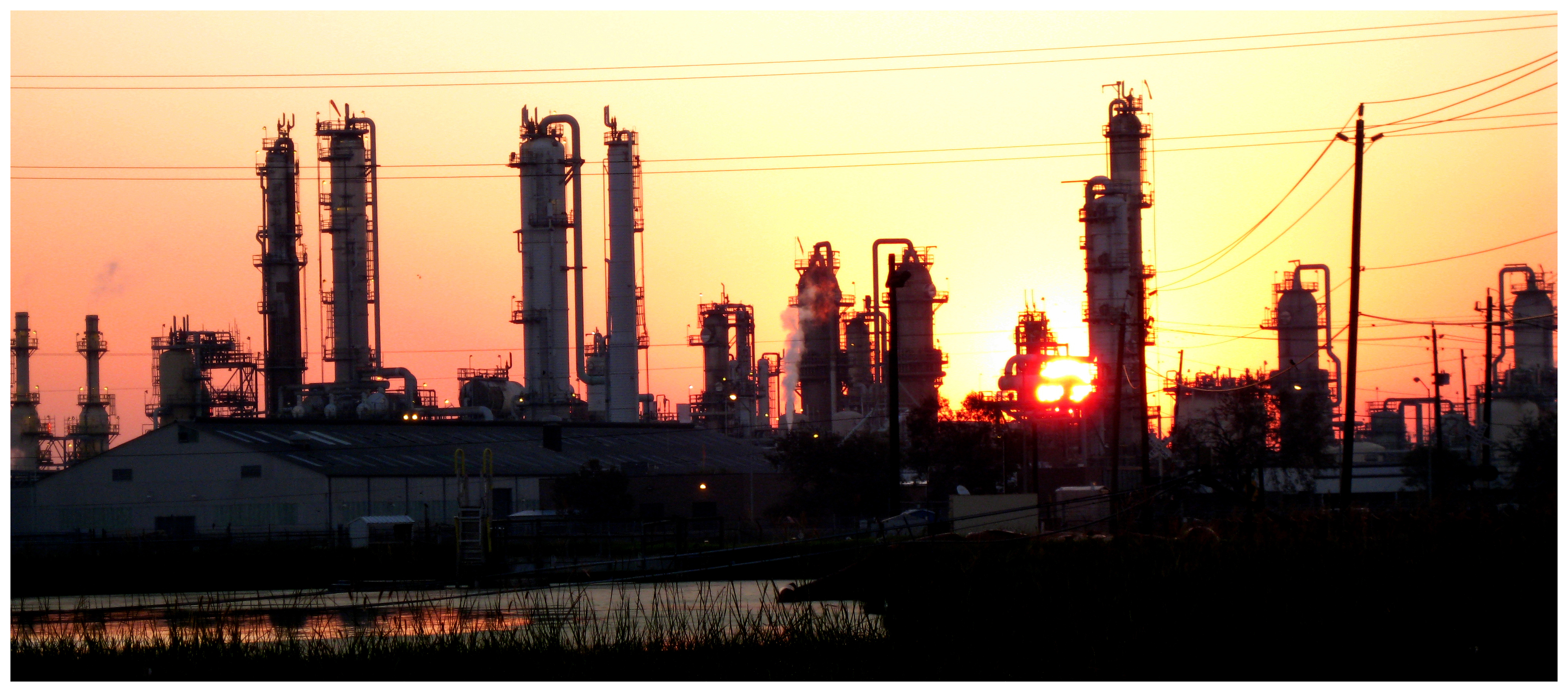
Baytown Refinery

The centerpieces of Baytown's economies are three industrial districts the city has created, all outside the city limits but within its extra-territorial jurisdiction. These districts primarily support petroleum and petrochemical processing. The anchors of the business community are ExxonMobil, Covestro, and Chevron Phillips. The ExxonMobil Baytown Complex, founded in 1919, is one of the world's largest industrial complexes. The Baytown Refinery located there is the largest in the United States. The Covestro (former Bayer MaterialScience) Baytown Industrial Park is the largest of Covestro's U.S. chemical processing sites producing a variety of petrochemical products. The Cedar Bayou plant, in operation since 1963, is Chevron Phillips Chemical's largest manufacturing site in the United States. It is a newer and growing industrial district which is quickly acquiring new tenants such as Jindal Steel and Power Limited and Samson Controls.

In addition to the heavy industry in the business community, Baytown is home to the Cedar Crossing Industrial Park. With a total expanse of 15,000 acres, Cedar Crossing Industrial Park is considered the world's fifth largest industrial park and the largest on the Gulf Coast. Cedar Crossing has attracted many top-tier companies with significant operations, including Home Depot's 755,000-square-foot distribution hub, Walmart's 4.2 million-square-foot import center (their largest in the U.S.), JSW Steel's plate and pipe manufacturing facilities, and Borusan Mannesmann's $148 million steel pipe manufacturing facility. Other occupants include Exel, S&B Engineers, National Oilwell, GE Water, TMK-IPSCO, Century Asphalt, Samson Controls, and LS Energy Fabrication.

As of 2006, the largest taxpayers in the city were ExxonMobil Company, CenterPoint Energy, Verizon Southwest, Wal-Mart Stores, Inc., Continental Airlines, Inc., Valero Marketing & Supply, Car Son Bay LP, Memorial NW Pavilion Trust, Camden Property Trust, and LCY Elastomers LP.

== Culture ==
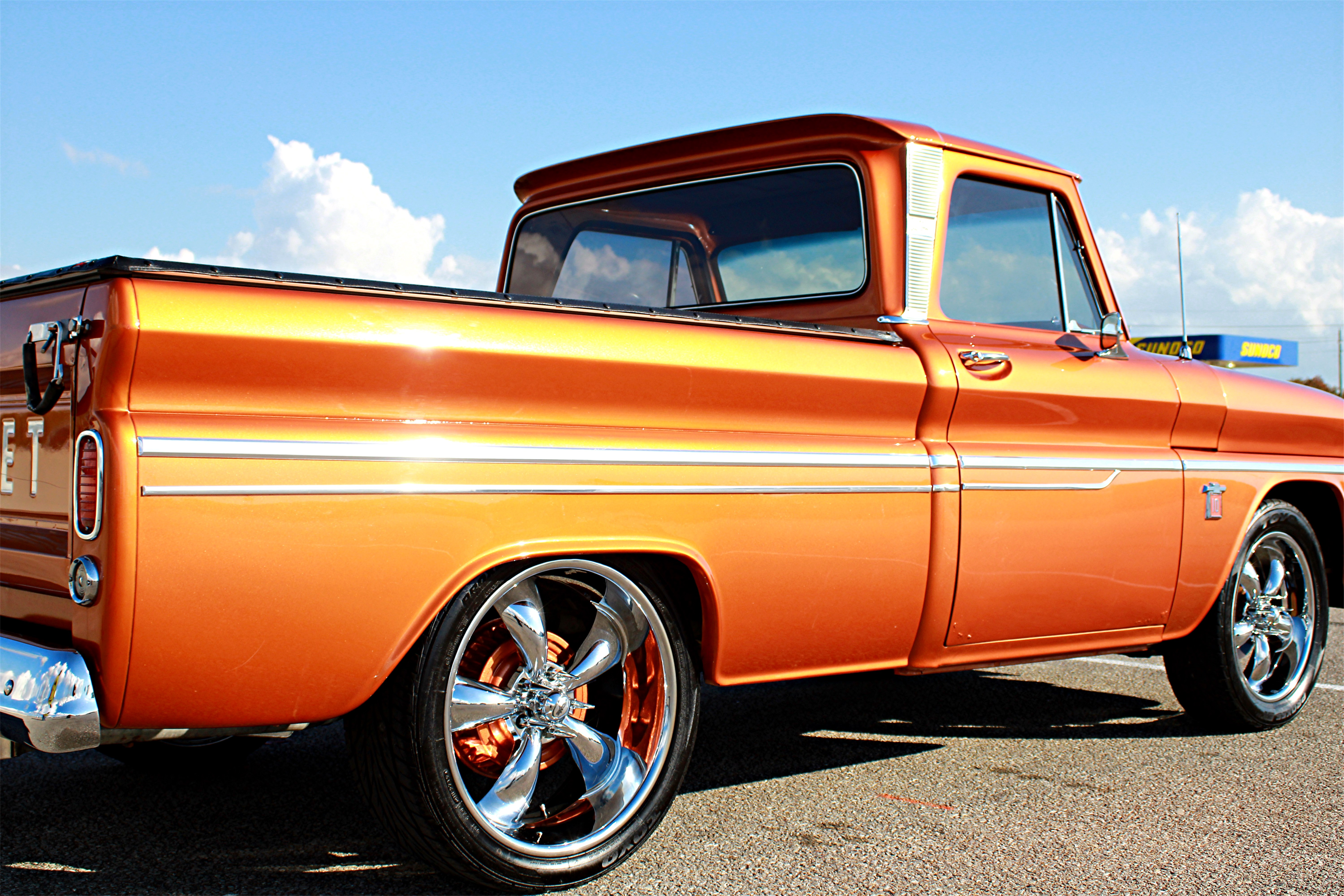
Texas Street Fest in Baytown, Texas

The Downtown Arts District is home to a plethora of different arts and cultures programs such as the Baytown Little Theater, Lee College Performing Arts Center, Art Gallery of Baytown, and the Baytown Public Art Program. The Baytown Little Theater is a community theater in Baytown run entirely by volunteers. The theater has been in operation for more than 55 years and is one of the longest continuously running community theaters in Texas. The theater typically produces six shows each year from September to August, with each show giving seven performances.

The Lee College Performing Arts Center hosts a number of theater performances, symphony performances, and art exhibits year around. The Baytown Symphony Orchestra, in residence at Lee College Performing Arts Center, performs several concerts throughout the year for the enjoyment of the public.

The Art Gallery of Baytown is also in the Downtown Arts District, and houses the Art League of Baytown. The Art League was organized in 1954 and incorporated as a Texas non-profit corporation in 1963. The gallery features works of art created by local artists. There is also a variety of gifts available for purchase such as paintings, pottery, jewelry, stained glass, photos, cards and other unique art.

In the Downtown Arts District are the roots of the Baytown Public Art Program spearheaded by the City of Baytown Tourism Division. Overseeing the program is the Public Art Visioning Committee with members from the Art League of Baytown, Lee College Art Department, Sterling Municipal Library, Parks and Recreation Department, and the Baytown Tourism Division.

=== Tourism and recreation ===
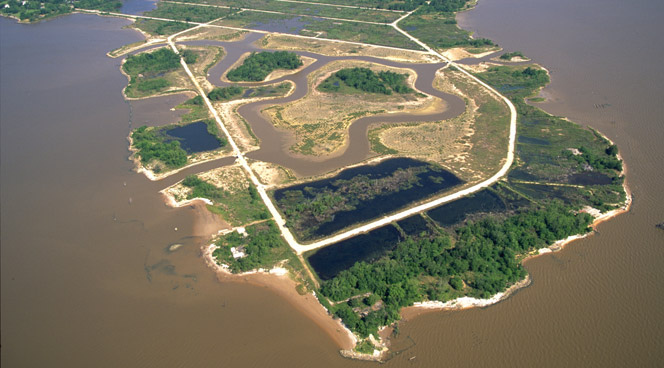
Baytown Nature Center

Baytown Nature Center, located on a 450-acre (1.8 km^{2}) peninsula along the Houston Ship Channel and surrounded on three sides by Burnet Bay, Crystal Bay, and Scott Bay, is both a recreation area and a wildlife sanctuary that is home to hundreds of bird species, mammals, reptiles, and aquatic species.

Houston Raceway was a motorsports complex featuring National Hot Rod Association (NHRA) races and a weekly drag racing program. Established in 1988, the venue accommodated 40,000 fans and included a high-banked dirt oval race track that hosted races each year from March through October.

=== Media ===
The Baytown Sun serves as the city and urban area's newspaper. Houston television, newspaper, and radio outlets also provide coverage of Baytown as part of the Greater Houston metropolitan area.

== Government and infrastructure ==
=== Local government ===
Baytown has a council–manager form of government. Jason Reynolds currently serves as the Baytown City Manager. Charles Johnson is Mayor while council members are Laura Alvarado, Sarah Graham, Ken Griffith, James Franco, Jacob Powell, and Mike Lester.

==== Mayors ====
- J. A. Ward, 1949-1953
- R. H. Pruett, 1953-1961
- Al Clayton, 1961-1963
- C. L. Liggett, 1963-1965
- Seaborn Cravey, 1965-1969
- Glen Walker, 1969-1973
- Tom Gentry, 1973-1978
- Emmett Hutto, 1978-1983, 1985-1992
- Allen Cannon, 1983-1985
- Bobby Credille, 1992-1996
- Pete C. Alfaro, 1996-2004
- Calvin Mundinger, 2004-2006
- Stephen DonCarlos, 2006-2018
- Brandon Capetillo, 2019-2024
- Charles Johnson, 2025–present

=== City services ===
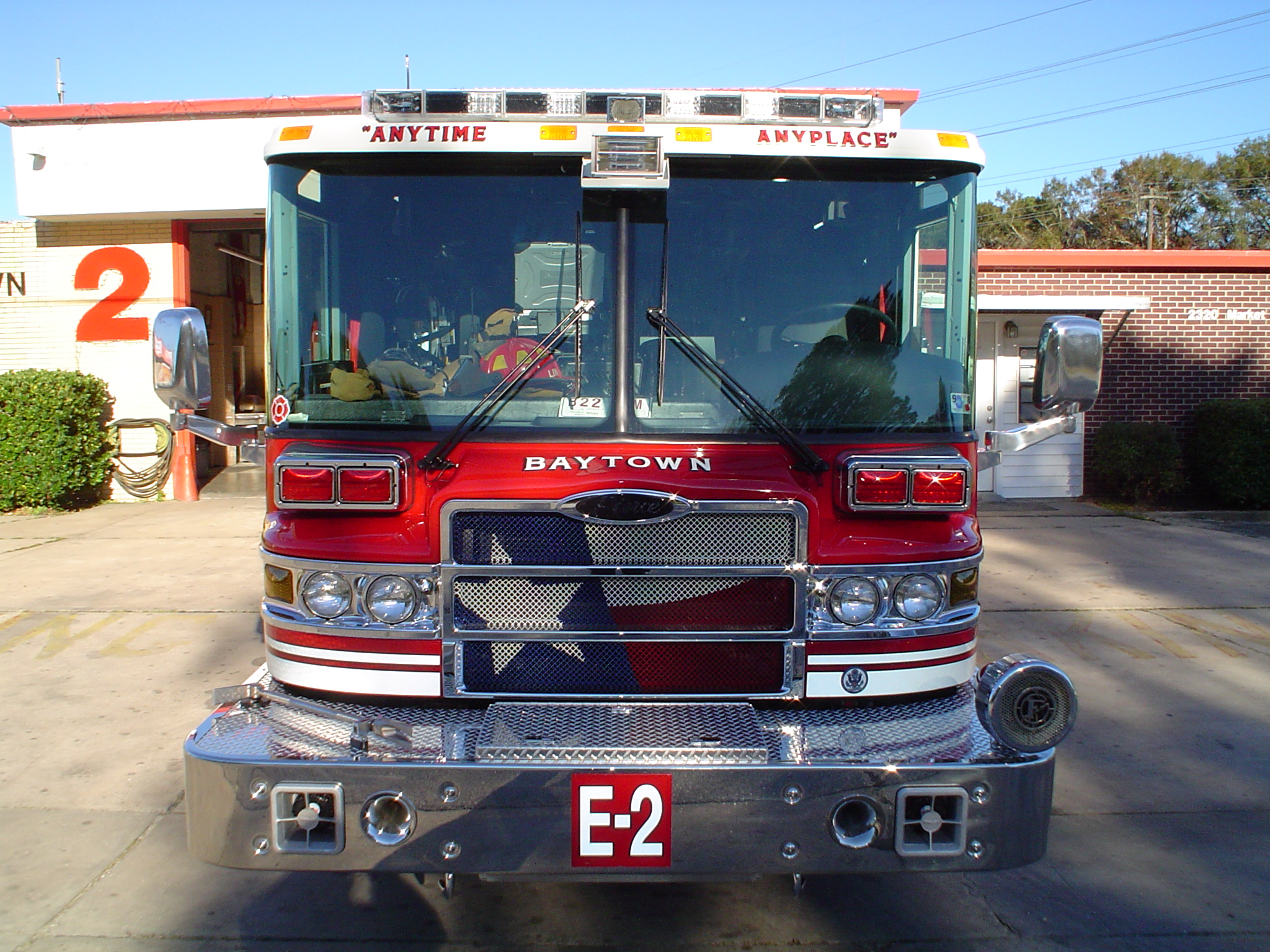
One of the engines of the Baytown Fire Department

The City of Baytown operates the Sterling Municipal Library, which has a collection of 300,000 items. The original Goose Creek Library opened in 1925; the first county library in Texas, it was funded by the private donations of Humble Oil and Refining Company president Ross S. Sterling. The current Sterling Library was dedicated in 1963. The library's space increased to 50,500 square feet (4,690 m^{2}) after bond programs in 1975 and 1995. In addition Baytown residents are served by the Harris County Public Library system.

The Baytown Police Department has 167 sworn officers and 52 support personnel as of 2014. The department provides all-hour patrol services and has many special units: SWAT, Dive Team, D.A.R.E., Hot Spot, Commercial Vehicle Enforcement, Investigations, Police Academy, Bomb Squad, and others.

Fire, rescue, hazardous materials response, and EMS are provided by the Baytown Fire Department, an all-professional department of approximately 140 sworn members.

=== County, state and federal services ===
The United States Postal Service operates the Baytown Main Post Office at 601 West Baker Road and the Baytown Post Office "Station A" at 3508 Market Street. The "Station A" designation is a leftover from Baytown's pre-consolidation days. Prior to consolidation in 1948 each of the tri-cities, (Baytown, Pelly, and Goose Creek), had their own post office. After 1948 when the tri-cities consolidated under the name Baytown, Goose Creek's post office became the main post office but they still needed a post office to service the rest of town so the Old Baytown Post Office became "Station A".

Harris County Precinct Two operates Baytown Park, a senior citizen sports complex, at 4500 Hemlock Drive. Baytown Park includes two unlighted baseball/softball fields and toilets. The precinct also operates the Baytown Soccer Complex, located north of Baytown at 9600 North Main Street in an unincorporated area. The complex has eight soccer fields; four are lighted and four are unlighted.

Harris Health System (formerly Harris County Hospital District) operates the Baytown Health Center in Baytown. The center opened on February 14, 1967. The designated public hospital is Lyndon B. Johnson Hospital in northeast Houston.

Harris County operates a tax office at 701 West Baker Boulevard.

== Education ==
=== Colleges and universities ===
East Harris County and West Chambers County are served by Lee College, a two-year community college.

=== Primary and secondary schools ===
Baytown is served by the Goose Creek Consolidated Independent School District. Based in Baytown, the district has 14 elementary schools (grades K–5), 6 junior highs (grades 6–8), 3 high schools (grades 9–12), a career center, and two alternative centers for education. The district serves all of Baytown, Highlands, outlying areas of East Harris County, and a small portion of western Chambers County. The three local high schools are Robert E. Lee (opened in 1928), Ross S. Sterling (opened in 1966), and Goose Creek Memorial High School (opened in 2008).

Stallworth Stadium is the home for varsity football and soccer for GCCISD. The stadium seats approximately 16,000 fans, making it one of the largest high school sports venues in the state. It recently underwent a press box renovation in 2009, as well as an innovation in 2006 when artificial turf and a huge scoreboard were installed. On a campaign stop for the 1976 presidential election, President Gerald Ford attended a Robert E. Lee High School fall football game.

The immediate area has four private schools. These include: Baytown Christian Academy, Chinquapin Preparatory School, Light House Baptist Academy, and the Roman Catholic Archdiocese of Galveston-Houston’s St. Joseph Regional Catholic School.

== Transportation ==
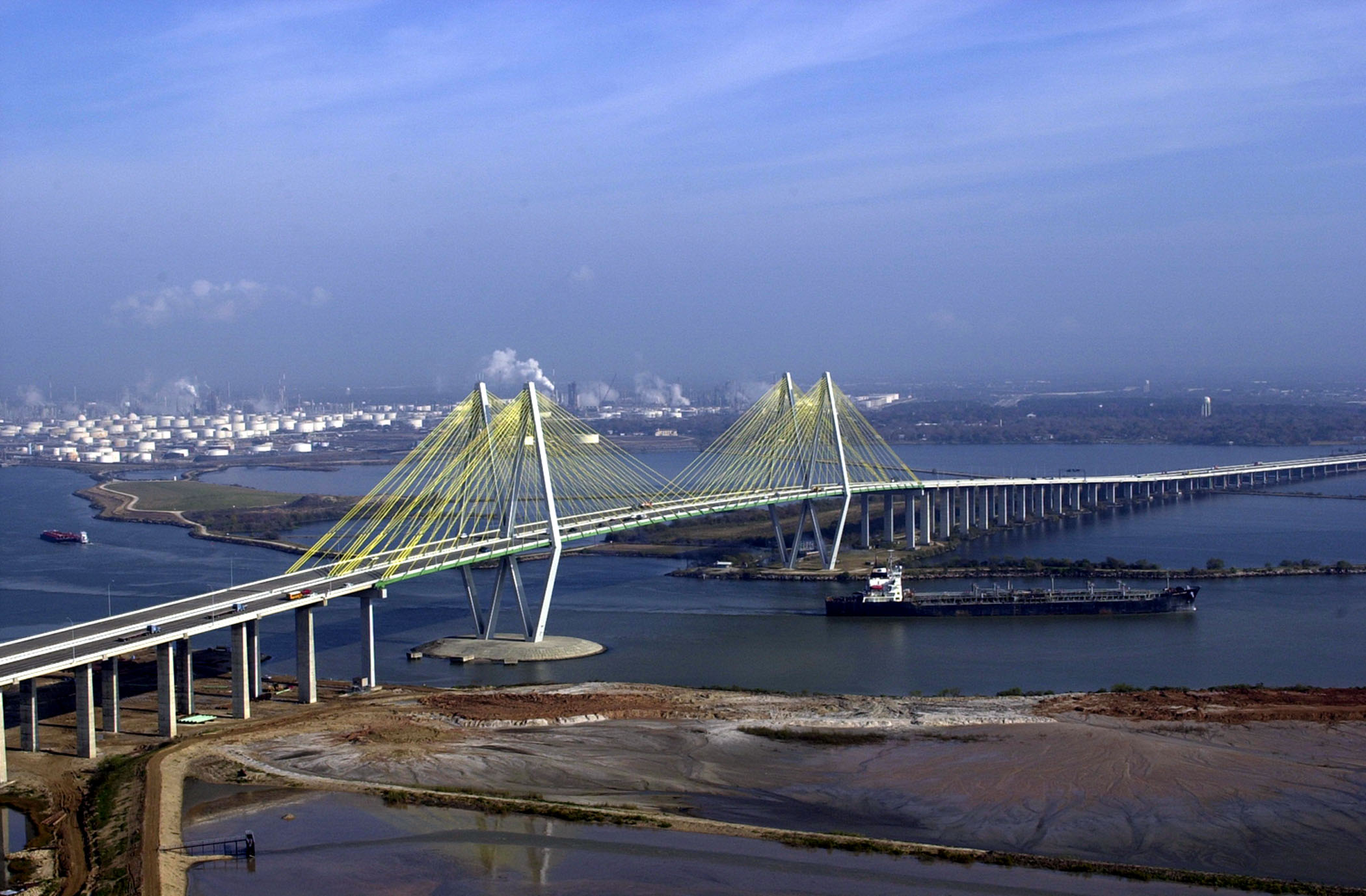
The Fred Hartman Bridge, which connects Baytown to La Porte

Harris County Transit provides public transportation. The Baytown Park and Ride lot is located on the western side of San Jacinto Mall. Harris County Transit also offers a bus line that runs along Decker Drive, Garth Road, North Main Street, Baker Road, and Rollingbrook Drive connecting most of Baytown's major shopping areas with Lee College.

Greyhound Bus Lines operates the Baytown Station at Baytown Travel Express.

Baytown Airport is a privately owned general aviation airport in unincorporated Harris County located north of Baytown. RWJ Airpark is a privately owned airport three miles (5 km) east of Baytown in Beach City. The closest airports with commercial airline service are William P. Hobby Airport and George Bush Intercontinental Airport in Houston.

Baytown is served by Metropolitan Transit Authority of Harris County, Texas (METRO) express route 236 Maxey Road/Baytown during the rush hours, sending commuters to Downtown Houston.

Baytown is linked to Interstate 10 (Baytown East Freeway) by State Highway 99 (Grand Parkway), State Highway 146 (Lanier Freeway) and Spur 330 (Decker Drive). It is also linked by the Fred Hartman Bridge, which crosses into the city from nearby La Porte; the bridge was built in 1995, replacing the Baytown Tunnel, to allow a deeper ship channel.

== Notable people ==
* Vula Malinga, singer/musician
- Mark Alford, U.S. representative for Missouri
- Rocky Bernard, defensive tackle for the NFL New York Giants
- Kirk Botkin, former NFL player and collegiate football coach
- William Broyles, Jr., screenwriter, co-founder of Texas Monthly magazine
- Gary Busey, actor
- Chris Cagle, country music artist
- Wanda Garner Cash, open government advocate and former publisher of The Baytown Sun
- Quentin Coryatt, former NFL player and Texas A & M linebacker
- Macey Cruthird, actress born in Baytown
- Bobby Fuller, rock musician; born in Baytown
- Jennifer Walker Elrod, Chief Judge of the United States Court of Appeals for the Fifth Circuit
- John Hagee, pastor of Cornerstone Church in San Antonio, Texas; born in Baytown
- Brian Johnson, football player
- "Mean" Gene Kelton, singer-songwriter, blues musician, and band leader
- Bob Lanier, born and raised in Baytown. Mayor of Houston 1991–1997
- Romany Malco, actor/rapper; attended Ross S. Sterling High School
- Fred Marti, Professional golfer; 1962 NCAA Champion University of Houston
- Leeland Mooring, lead singer for Christian band Leeland
- RaeLynn, country music star and competed on The Voice
- Ell Roberson III, former Kansas State University quarterback
- Howard Sampson, former NFL player
- Wayne Smith (born 1943), member of the Texas House of Representatives
- Sherwood Stewart, former Pro Tennis player
- Clint Stoerner, former Dallas Cowboys and University of Arkansas quarterback
- Tom Stolhandske, NFL and CFL player
- Drew Tate, former University of Iowa quarterback and current CFL member
- Joe Tex, popular R&B singer during the 1960s
- Buddy Wakefield, champion slam poet, was raised in Baytown
- Henrietta Bell Wells, lawyer, first African-American woman to participate in debate team in Wiley College
- Glenn Wilson, former Major League Baseball outfielder
