= Washburn Tunnel =

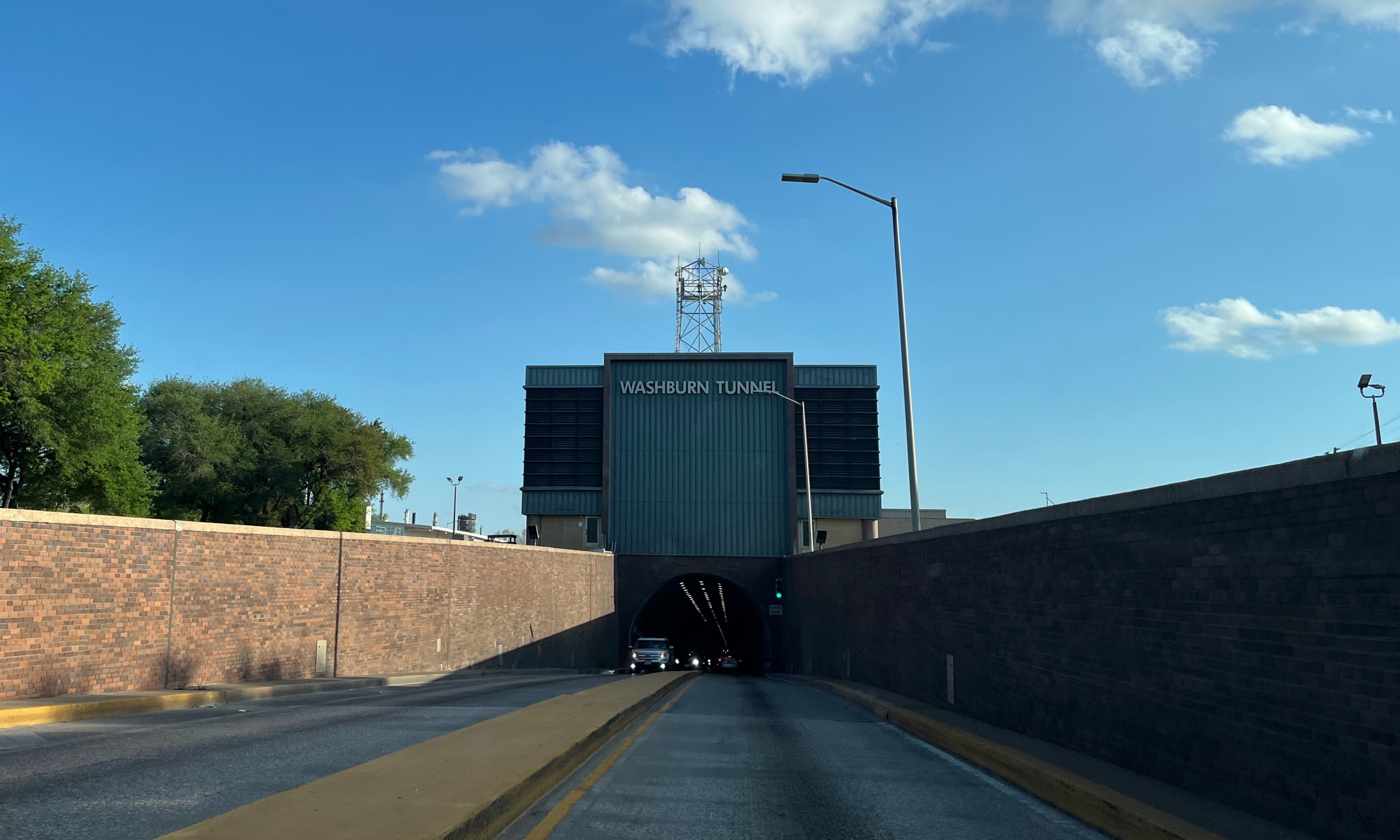
- Northern portal of the tunnel in 2026
- Interactive map of Washburn Tunnel

Overview
- Location: Underneath the Houston Ship Channel
- Status: Open
- Route: Federal Road

Operation
- Work began: 1945
- Opened: May 1950
- Operator: Harris County Toll Road Authority
- Toll: Free

Technical
- Length: 3,791 ft (1,155 m)
- No. of lanes: 2
- Washburn Tunnel
- U.S. National Register of Historic Places
- Location within Texas Location within the United States
- Location: Harris County, Texas, USA
- Coordinates: 29°43′35″N 95°12′43″W
- Architectural style: Various
- NRHP reference No.: 08000316
- Added to NRHP: April 16, 2008

The Washburn Tunnel is a two-lane underwater motor-vehicle tunnel connecting Galena Park and Pasadena, two suburbs of Houston, Texas. Completed in 1950, it travels north–south underneath the Houston Ship Channel. It was named after Harris County, Texas Auditor Harry L. Washburn. It is the largest and first toll-free vehicular tunnel in the Southern United States.

It is the only underwater vehicle tunnel currently in operation in the state, as the Baytown Tunnel was replaced in 1995 by the Fred Hartman Bridge.

== History ==
The Merritt Chapman and Scott Corporation of New York built the $7 million project. First, a trench 90 ft (27 m) by 40 ft (12 m) had to be dug. Second, the sections had to be locked into position 85 feet underwater. Finally, the last touches, such as tiling the inside, were completed.

The tunnel was added to the National Register of Historic Places on April 16, 2008.

On March 1, 2020, operations of the Washburn Tunnel, along with the Lynchburg Ferry, were transferred from Harris County Precinct 2 to the Harris County Toll Road Authority (HCTRA). There are no plans for HCTRA to implement tolls at either the Washburn Tunnel or the Lynchburg Ferry. Nevertheless, HCTRA's involvement will include plans to improve the operations of both facilities, as well as much-needed repairs and upgrades.

== Description ==
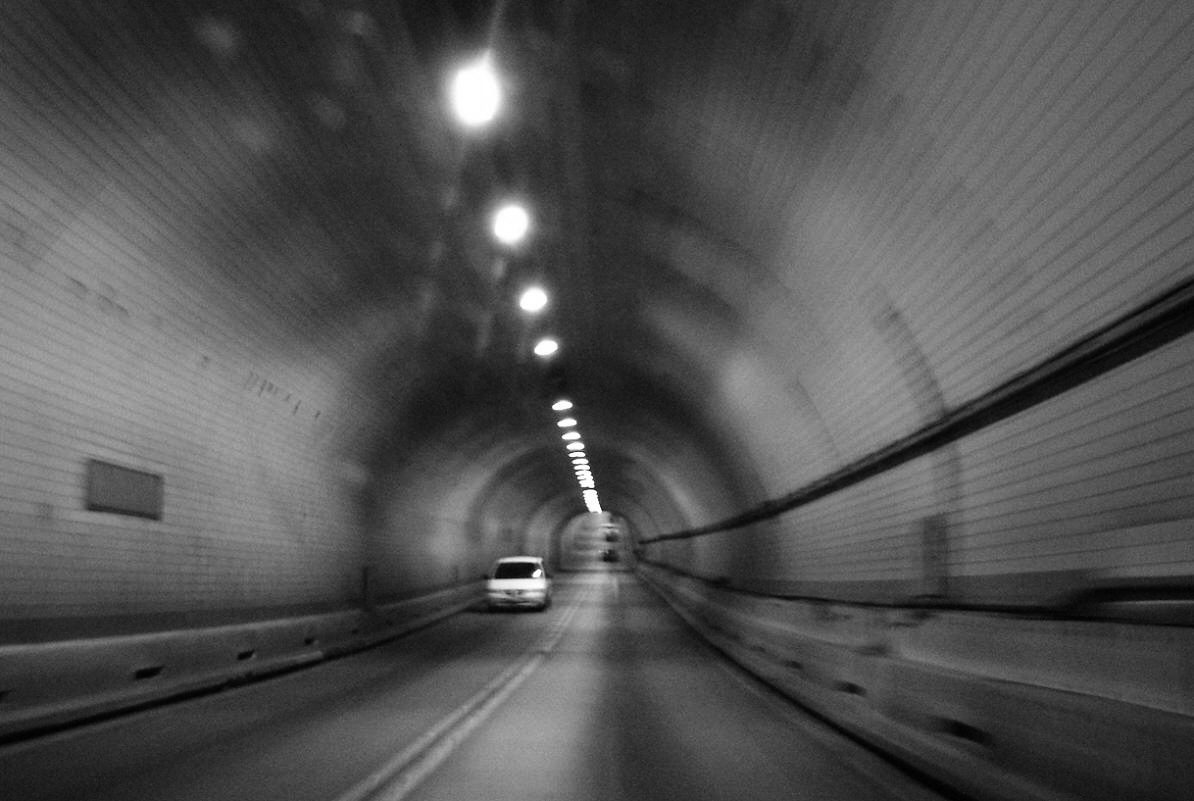
Interior of the tunnel in 2009

The tunnel approach and vicinity in 2014

The tunnel consists of a single bore, 2,909 feet (887 m) in length, with a six-percent roadway grade outward from the center towards each exit. Forced transverse ventilation is potentially provided by three automatic high-speed Westinghouse Sturtevant blower fans located in a tower at the north entrance. These fans are designed to keep the air free from high-levels of carbon monoxide.

In the event of electrical failure, a generator can support the electrical needs of the tunnel. Every twelfth light is powered by a generator. The light intensity at the portals is three times brighter than the interior. This prevents temporary blindness when entering the tunnel.

Pumps located under the road surface counter accumulation of water by draining it back into the ship channel. Before Hurricane Ike in 2008, the tunnel had never flooded.

The tunnel is one of five vehicular crossings of the Ship Channel. The other four are the Sidney Sherman Bridge, popularly known as the (Interstate) 610 or Ship Channel bridge; the Sam Houston Ship Channel Bridge, formerly the Jesse Jones Toll Bridge and popularly known as the Beltway 8 Bridge; the Fred Hartman Bridge connecting La Porte, Texas and Baytown, Texas; and the Lynchburg Ferry. The tunnel is also the only 24-hour operation in Precinct Two.

== Specifications ==
- Total Cost: $7,683,915 (1950)
- Total Length: 3,791 feet (1,155 m)
- Distance between Portals: 2,936 feet (895 m)
- Length of Tube Section: 1,500 feet (460 m)
- Roadway Width: 22 feet (6.7 m)
- Headroom (each lane): 13 feet (4.0 m)
- Headroom (center Lane): 18 feet (5.5 m)
- Internal Diameter of Tubes: 32 feet (9.8 m)
- External Diameter of Tubes: 38 feet (12 m)
- Max. Grade: 6%
- Max. Dept (Water to top): 45 feet (14 m)
- Max. Dept (Water to roadway): 68 feet (21 m)
- Max. Dept (water to bottom): 80 feet (24 m)
- Dredging: 425,273 cu. yards
- Excavation: 289,600 cu. yards
- Tremie Concrete: 11,750 cu. yards
- Concrete: 34,250 cu. yards
- Steel in tubes: 2,373 tons
- Ceramic Tile: 1,061,000
- Number of fans: 3
- Max Ventilation: 760,000 cfm
- Complete Air Exchange: 2 minutes
