= Cedar Bayou Plant =

Petrochemical manufacturing facility

Cedar Bayou Plant is a petrochemical manufacturing facility located in Baytown, Texas. It is the largest U.S. manufacturing facility of Chevron Phillips Chemical. The plant operates seven process units on approximately 1,400 acres producing ethylene, propylene, normal alpha olefins (NAO), high-density polyethylene (HDPE), low-density polyethylene (LDPE), linear low-density polyethylene (LLDPE), and polyalphaolefins. Cedar Bayou Plant opened in 1963 as Gulf Oil and was sold to Chevron Corp. in 1985. In 2000, Chevron Corp. and Phillips 66 merged their chemical businesses to form Chevron Phillips Chemical Company.

Cedar Bayou Plant employs approximately 800 employees and 1,200 nested contractors.

== History ==
=== Gulf Oil ===
When Gulf Oil decided to build a new chemicals plant in 1962, the company made the announcement at a Baytown Chamber of Commerce luncheon. Some 230 people attended a lunch on March 13, 1962 to hear Gulf Oil vice president Dr. Alexander Lewis Jr. discuss his company's plans for the 1,000 acres of prairieland just east of the town's center. Attendees of the lunch paid $2.50. Baytown Mayor Al Clayton attended the historic Chamber lunch alongside County Commissioner V.V. Ramsey, County Judge Bill Elliott, Houston Chamber of Commerce executive vice president Marvin Hurley, and congratulatory telegrams were sent by Texas Governor Price Daniel and Texas Senators John Tower and Ralph Yarborough.

Gulf Oil's new project was being represented as the initial development of what someday is expected to be a vast complex of interrelated industrial facilities. Named the Cedar Bayou Plant , Gulf Oil would build one ethylene unit and preserve about 15 additional acres for future expansion. The geographic location of Cedar Bayou Plant was favorable in relation to raw material supplies from the growing pipeline grid in Texas and the nearby underground storage facilities, or salt domes, in Mont Belvieu, Texas. Approximately 65 people were employed at the plant.

In 1975, Gulf Oil announced two expansion projects at Cedar Bayou Plant. A new ethylene unit was to be built and replace the original ethylene unit that opened the plant in 1963. This ethylene unit is still in operation today. In addition, a low-density polyethylene plant was also constructed on the plant's vacant west end. By 1976, the Cedar Bayou Plant 's employee base had increased to 350 workers – 250 of which were Gulf Oil employees and 100 were nested contractors. During the expansion projects, construction workers peaked at 2,500.

On Sept. 28, 1982, the Cedar Bayou Plant received a letter from an anonymous person that ten bombs had been hidden within the plant. The sender of the letter threatened to detonate the bombs unless Gulf Oil paid $15 million. Gulf Oil shut down the Cedar Bayou Plant after determining the letter was a legitimate threat. A search of the Cedar Bayou Plant located five sophisticated bombs in metal casings. A federal and multi-state investigation led to the arrest of four people—John Marvin McBride; his common-law wife, Jill Renee Bird; Michael Allen Worth, and Theodore D. McKinney, all of Durango, Colorado. Charges against Jill Renee Bird were dropped in exchange for her husband's cooperation.

=== Chevron Corporation ===
The era of Gulf Oil ended for the Cedar Bayou Plant in 1984. During this time, Gulf Oil was negotiating what newspapers called the “largest business takeover in U.S. history” when Standard Oil Co. of California, also known as Socal, purchased the struggling Gulf Oil for $13.3 billion. When the deal was complete, Socal transferred its newly acquired Texas Gulf Coast plants to Chevron Corporation, which at the time was owned by Socal. By acquiring Gulf Oil, Socal nearly doubled its worldwide proved oil and gas reserves overnight.

In September 1985, Chevron Corporation announced an expansion of the plant's existing alpha olefins unit.

On October 12, 1990, a fire was reported at the Cedar Bayou Plant. News reports stated that a 100-foot flame could be seen coming from the plant. The fire was extinguished by the plant's internal fire brigade. No injuries occurred.

On October 18, 1994, the normally placid Cedar Bayou waterway overflowed and flooded much of Baytown, Texas. In just over two days, 30 inches of rain fell on the bayou's watershed and the Cedar Bayou was flooded. When the rain runoff began spilling into the plant's electrical substation, the facility lost all outside electrical power forcing operators to shut down most process units. Employees watched temporary barriers fail and control rooms, warehouses, and offices become submerged. In a Baytown Sun newspaper interview shortly after, then-plant Manager Larry Lucchesi said it was the worst disaster to strike the plant in its 32 years.

=== Chevron Phillips Chemical ===
In 2000, Chevron Corporation invested in a 50-50 joint venture with Phillips 66, formerly known as Phillips Petroleum. In this joint venture, Chevron Corporation moved most of its petrochemical operations into the new The Woodlands-based company, including the Cedar Bayou Plant. The Cedar Bayou Plant became the largest of 34 manufacturing facilities owned by Chevron Phillips Chemical Co.

On Dec. 14, 2011, Chevron Phillips Chemical announced plans to build a world-scale ethylene cracker at the Cedar Bayou Plant as part of the U.S. Gulf Coast Petrochemicals Project. the U.S. Gulf Coast Petrochemicals Project is expected to create approximately 400 long-term direct jobs and 10,000 engineering and construction jobs, and increase ethylene production at the Cedar Bayou Plant by 3.3 billion pounds per year. On April 2, 2014 the Cedar Bayou Plant held a groundbreaking ceremony for the construction project.

On April 2, 2012, Chevron Phillips Chemical announced that it would build the world's largest on-purpose 1-hexene plant at the Cedar Bayou Plant. A groundbreaking ceremony was held at the Cedar Bayou Plant in June 2012. The project was completed in June 2014, adding production of 1-hexene at 551 million pounds per year to the Cedar Bayou Plant.

On Oct. 21, 2013, the Cedar Bayou Plant celebrated its 50th anniversary. The celebration included an 8-by-5 foot cake, inviting all the former plant managers back to the plant, and awarding Legacy Awards to current and former employees.
