= Samson AG =

German manufacturing company

SAMSON AG
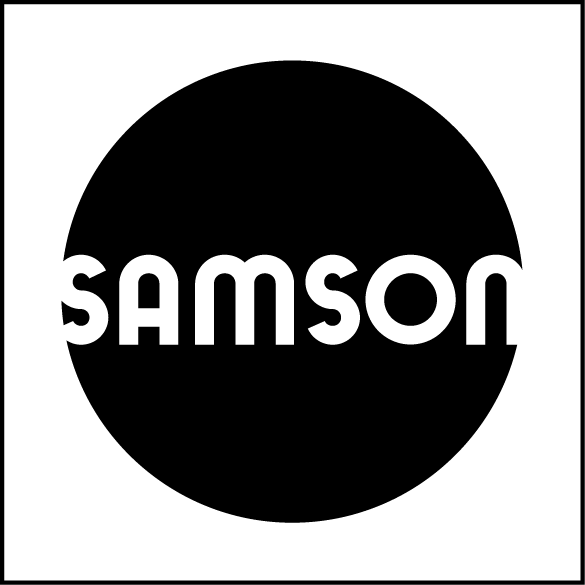
- Native name: SAMSON AKTIENGESELLSCHAFT
- Company type: Aktiengesellschaft
- Industry: Chemical industry, Petrochemical industry, Food industry, Pharmaceutical industry, Biotechnology, Energy industry, Industrial Gases, Metallurgy and mining, Marine equipment, Water and Wastewater, Pulp and Paper
- Founded: April 1, 1907
- Founder: Hermann Sandvoss
- Headquarters: Frankfurt am Main, Germany
- Number of locations: 50 subsidiaries in over 40 countries, more than 200 agencies (2021)
- Key people: Andreas Widl (CEO, Chairman); Dr. Dominic Deller (CFO); Marcus Miertz (CSO)
- Products: Smart Process Automation; Control valves (Globe valves, Rotary valves); Self-operated regulators Actuators; Accessories; Singal converters Automation systems Sensors and thermostats Digital Solutions; Service
- Revenue: € 885 million (2023)
- Number of employees: 4,500 (2021)
- Website: https://www.samsongroup.com/en/

SAMSON AG, founded in 1907 is a German control valve manufacturing company headquartered in Frankfurt. It develops systems and products that can control all types of fluid. Its product line includes valves, self-operating regulators, automation systems, sensors, thermostats, and digital devices, among others.

== History ==
Samson AG initially gained recognition for inventing a self-operated thermostat valve that regulated temperature in grain silos without external power in 1907. By 1916, Samson AG had relocated its main manufacturing facility and headquarters to Frankfurt’s River Main. Over the years, the company expanded its product line to include control valves, self-operated regulators, actuators, and automation systems. Significant milestones include the introduction of the first pneumatic control valves in the 1950s, expansion into digital control systems in the 1980s, and the formation of a joint venture with Krohne Messtechnik in 2019. The company has received numerous innovation awards, industry certifications like ISO 9001 and ISO 14001, and recognition for sustainability initiatives.

Today, SAMSON operates in over 40 countries with more than 4,500 employees and more than 50 subsidiaries, more than 200 engineering and service centers worldwide.

== Products ==
Samson AG specializes in the manufacturing and supply of a wide range of products for process control. Their primary offerings include control valves, self-operated regulators, actuators, and various accessories. They also provide signal converters, automation systems, sensors, and thermostats. Samson AG’s products are designed to control all kinds of media and are used across multiple industries, including chemical, petrochemical, food, pharmaceutical, biotechnology, energy, industrial gases, metallurgy, marine equipment, water and wastewater, and pulp and paper. Additionally, SAMSON AG's associated companies AIR TORQUE S.p.A., CERA SYSTEM Verschleißschutz GmbH, KT-Elektronik GmbH, LEUSCH GmbH Industriearmaturen, Pfeiffer Chemie-Armaturenbau GmbH, RINGO VÁLVULAS S.L., SED FLow Control GmbH, STARLINE S.p.A., and VETEC Ventiltechnik GmbH offer technologies for severe requirements: e.g. abrasive and contaminated fluids, high shutdown pressures, lowest interior and exterior leak rates, quick-action, on-off, and control functions, as well as alloys like Monel, Hastelloy, titanium, zirconium, duplex, etc.

== Board of directors ==
The board of directors at Samson AG is composed of key executives who oversee various aspects of the company’s operations. Dr. Andreas Widl serves as the chief executive officer (CEO) and chairman of the executive board. Dr. Dominic Deller holds the position of chief financial officer (CFO), responsible for finance and human resources.
