= Baytown Nature Center =

Nature center in Texas, United States

Coordinates: 29.75°N 95.05°W

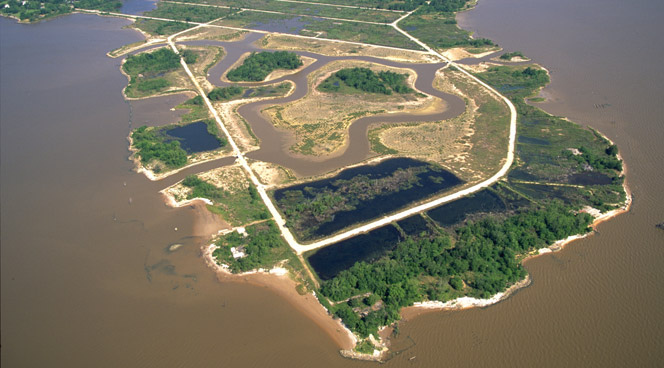
- Aerial view of the Nature Center
- Interactive map of Baytown Nature Center
- Location: Baytown, Texas, US
- Nearest city: Houston, Texas
- Governing body: City of Baytown, Texas

The Baytown Nature Center is located in Baytown, Texas, 20 miles (32 km) east of Houston. It is located on a 450-acre (1.8 km^{2}) peninsula along the Houston Ship Channel and surrounded on three sides by Burnet Bay, Crystal Bay, and Scott Bay.

The Baytown Nature Center is both a recreation area and a wildlife sanctuary that is home to hundreds of bird species, mammals, reptiles, and aquatic species. The City of Baytown created this Nature Center in 1994. The SWA Group's Houston office provided land planning and landscape architectural services.

== History ==
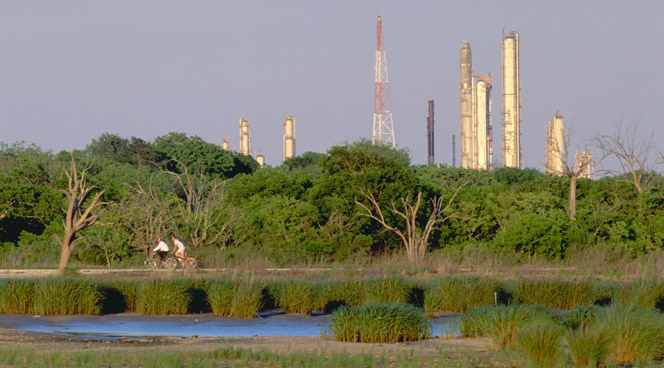
View of the wetland trails

The Baytown Nature Center was, for many years, a highly desirable residential neighborhood known as Brownwood with nearly 400 substantial homes on a 500-acre (2.0 km^{2}) peninsula.

In 1961, Hurricane Carla devastated the Texas Gulf Coast, flooding most of Brownwood and ending any new development in the area. Afterwards, subsidence became a serious problem as industrial and municipal water users along the Houston Ship Channel and in the general Houston area pumped out groundwater faster than natural forces could replenish the aquifer(s). Thus, during the 1970s and 1980s, much of the Texas Gulf Coast (including most of Brownwood) sank a total of 10 to 15 feet (4.6 m). Brownwood, which had previously been high and dry, was repeatedly inundated by high tides and storms.

In 1983, extensive damage from Hurricane Alicia finally led to the abandonment of most of Brownwood's homes. The City of Baytown started buying out the properties of neighborhood residents. In 1984, the City prepared its first master plan to transform these properties into a public park and wildlife sanctuary.

By 1990, the steadily encroaching waters had submerged many Brownwood streets. In 1991, Baytown's voters approved $300,000 in bonds for the Brownwood Marsh Restoration Project. Although the bonds were sold in 1994, the $300,000 was hardly enough to meet the master plan's $1.4 million budget.

The short-fall was made up by the French Limited Task Group, a Superfund consortium of 200 companies, headed by ARCO Chemical Company. A United States District Court had ordered the Task Group to carry out a marsh restoration project to replace natural resources that were damaged or destroyed by members’ illegal dumping activities.

The City of Baytown carried out the phased restoration project. Crouch Environmental Services, a Houston-based environmental consulting firm which specializes in wetlands design and construction, was the prime consultant and contractor. The Houston office of The SWA Group—an international land planning, landscape architecture, and urban design firm based in Sausalito, California—provided land planning and landscape architectural services.

== Planning and development ==
In 1994, the Brownwood Marsh Restoration Project's master plan, which had been prepared by Crouch Environmental Services and The SWA Group, was approved by a Project Review Group consisting of the U.S. Fish and Wildlife Service, the National Marine Fisheries Service, the Texas Natural Resource Conservation Commission, the Texas Parks and Wildlife Department, and the Texas General Land Office.

In late 1994, work on the 450-acre (1.8 km^{2}) Brownwood Marsh Restoration Project began. First, work crews sealed the inlets into nearby Scott Bay so that they could temporarily pump the water out of the property. Then, workers removed the remaining roads, houses, and utilities from the site. Afterwards, they graded the property and dug three 60-foot (18 m)-wide channels through the property. Once work was complete, these channels were used to re-flood the site and provide good crosscurrent flows to encourage natural restoration activity and feed the returning wetlands wildlife. The channels also provided the necessary tidal exchange (with its nutrient-rich, oxygenated waters) to help create important “edge” habitats for crustaceans, fish, and birds.

In their grading operations, the crews also transformed two elevated areas, which included hundreds of mature trees, into islands and created four new small freshwater ponds. These freshwater ponds and the planting of cabbage palmettos, live oaks, as well as beneficial bottomland shrubs and trees like red maple and green ash, were designed to lure a wide variety of migrant and indigenous birds, reptiles, and small mammals to the site.

For the Baytown Nature Center's watery edges and its inland areas, Crouch Environmental Services and The SWA Group selected flora with high value for wildlife, like nesting areas and food. They also specified plant species like Smooth cordgrass, Sedge, Wiregrass, and live oaks that already thrived in this coastal area.

As early as Fall 1995, with just one phase of construction largely completed, deer, fish, crustaceans, and 275 bird species had already appeared in the new wetlands, including two endangered species: the Osprey, a fish-eating hawk, and the three-foot-tall wood stork.

== The Baytown Nature Center today ==
Today, the Baytown Nature Center has two peninsulas. Absolutely all dogs/pets are banned - even those remaining within their owners vehicle. The smaller of the two peninsulas—San Jacinto Point—is designated as a recreation area. In addition to large oak trees and grass lawns, San Jacinto Point has three fishing piers, an observation platform, a Children's Nature Discovery Area playground, picnic tables, benches, and a concrete walkway along the bay shoreline.

The much larger peninsula—known as the Natural Area—has two islands with mixed woodlands, a saltwater marsh, freshwater marsh, several ponds, as well as mixed woodlands and tall grass habitats for birds, mammals, and other wildlife. The Crystal Bay Butterfly Garden near the entrance is planted with native plants and wildflowers that attract butterflies and hummingbirds.

The Brownwood Education Pavilion—a covered shelter atop a 35-foot (11 m)-high hill surrounded by wetlands—has panoramic views of the Natural Area's wetlands and the three surrounding bays. Five nature trails of varying lengths loop through the peninsula. The Natural Area's observation blinds and platforms overlook the ponds. They, along with wood duck boxes and trails, are far enough away from the islands and nesting areas to avoid disturbing the burgeoning wildlife, yet close enough for Baytown residents and visitors to observe nature's beauty and diversity.

Currently home to 317 species of resident and neo-tropical migratory birds, the Baytown Nature Center is part of the Great Texas Coastal Birding Trail, a 500-mile (800 km) trail of bird watching sites from Beaumont to Brownsville.

Operated by the City of Baytown and open to the public (for a fee), the Baytown Nature Center has also become an important nursery area for a variety of aquatic species, including shrimp, crab, and various fish.
