= Lynchburg Ferry =

United States free ferry

Coordinates: 29.7635°N 95.0800°W

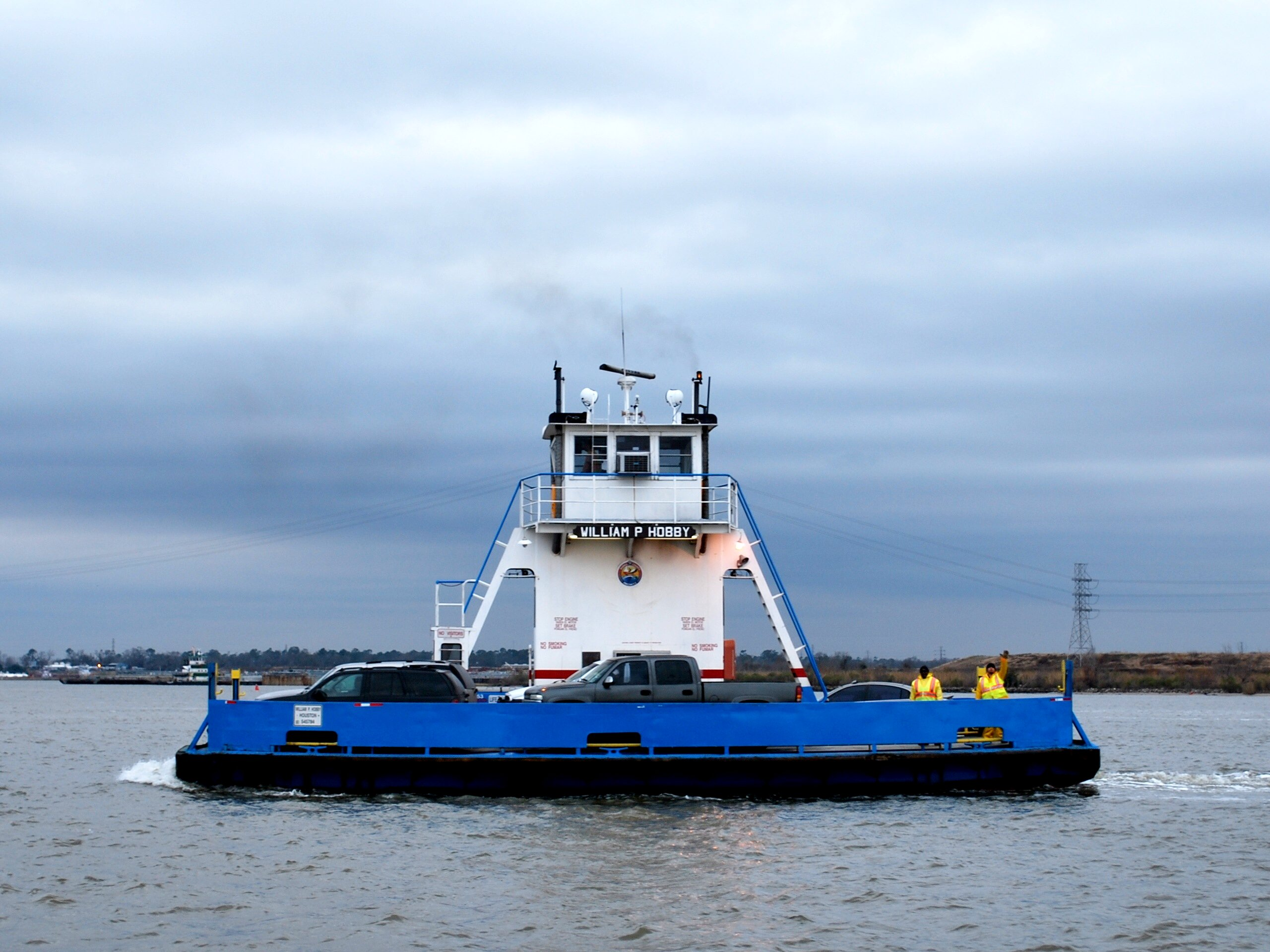
The Lynchburg Ferry

The Lynchburg Ferry is a free ferry across the Houston Ship Channel in the U.S. state of Texas, connecting Crosby-Lynchburg Road in Lynchburg to the north with the former State Highway 134 and San Jacinto Battleground State Historic Site in La Porte to the south. Operated by the Harris County Toll Road Authority, the 1,080 feet (330 m) crossing is the oldest operating ferry service within the state of Texas.

It carries automobiles, bicycles and pedestrians for free. Harris County had operated the ferry from 1888 to 2020. Ferries depart daily approximately every 5–10 minutes, beginning at 4:30 a.m. (04:30) and operate through 8:15 p.m. (20:15) and have a maximum capacity of 12 vehicles. The service averages between approximately 1,500-2,000 vehicles per day.

The service has two ships in its fleet, both completed in 1964 by the Todd Shipyard. The ferries are named in honor of former Texas governors William P. Hobby and Ross S. Sterling. A third ferry with a capacity of 9 vehicles dating from 1937 is available on standby if needed.

== History ==
The present-day location of this ferry can trace its origins back to 1822 when it was constructed by Nathaniel Lynch just below the confluence of the San Jacinto River and the Buffalo Bayou and was known as Lynch's Ferry. The ferry was used by the Republic of Texas troops fighting Mexican forces in the Battle of San Jacinto April 1836. In what was later referred to as the Runaway Scrape, as many as 5,000 Texans fled eastward to escape the advancing army of Mexican General Antonio Lopez de Santa Anna utilizing the ferry. In the following days, Sam Houston's army defeated Santa Anna at San Jacinto, which resulted in Texas independence.

By 1837 the Harris County Commissioners Court would set formal ferry rates only to eliminate them in 1890, and the ferry service has been free ever since. By 1949 the ferry service was renamed as the Lynchburg Ferry in serving as the first vehicular crossing of the Houston Ship Channel.

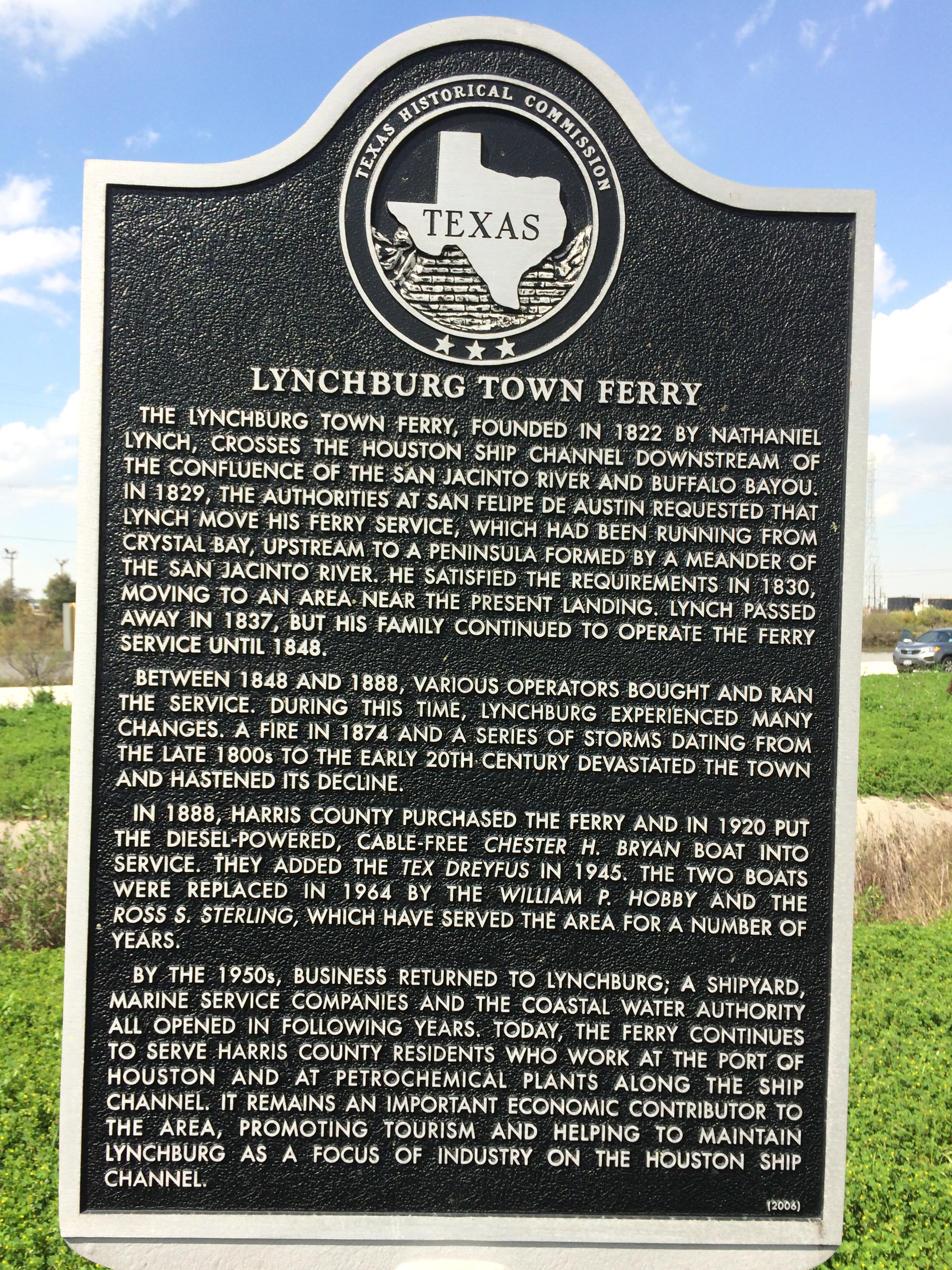
Texas Historical Commission 2006 Marker - The Lynchburg Town Ferry

The service would operate 24 hours per day, 365 days a year under the operation of Harris County through June 2004 when hours were reduced to their current times. Replacement vessels have been under consideration by the county since late 2004, but have yet to be ordered.

On March 1, 2020, operations of the Lynchburg Ferry, along with the Washburn Tunnel, were transferred from Harris County Precinct 2 to the Harris County Toll Road Authority (HCTRA). There are no plans for HCTRA to implement tolls either the Lynchburg Ferry or the Washburn Tunnel. Nevertheless, HCTRA's involvement will include plans to improve the operations of both facilities, as well as much-needed repairs and upgrades.

== Accidents and incidents ==
- February 26, 1995 - A barge struck the south landing resulting in the closure of the service for over eleven weeks. The service would reopen on May 11, 1995.
- September 19, 2004 - A woman drowned after the vehicle she was in was driven off the ferry into the channel. The driver was subsequently charged with intoxication manslaughter in the death.
- May 14, 2008 - A man appeared to deliberately drive his truck into the Houston Ship Channel, authorities said, refusing help from horrified witnesses who were waiting to board the Lynchburg Ferry. Witnesses say the man locked doors and refused help before going under.
- September 12, 2008 - Hurricane Ike caused approximately $300,000 damage to the Lynchburg Ferry. The ferry was closed 52 days for repair and reopened November 3, 2008.
