= Baytown Refinery =

ExxonMobil oil refinery in Texas

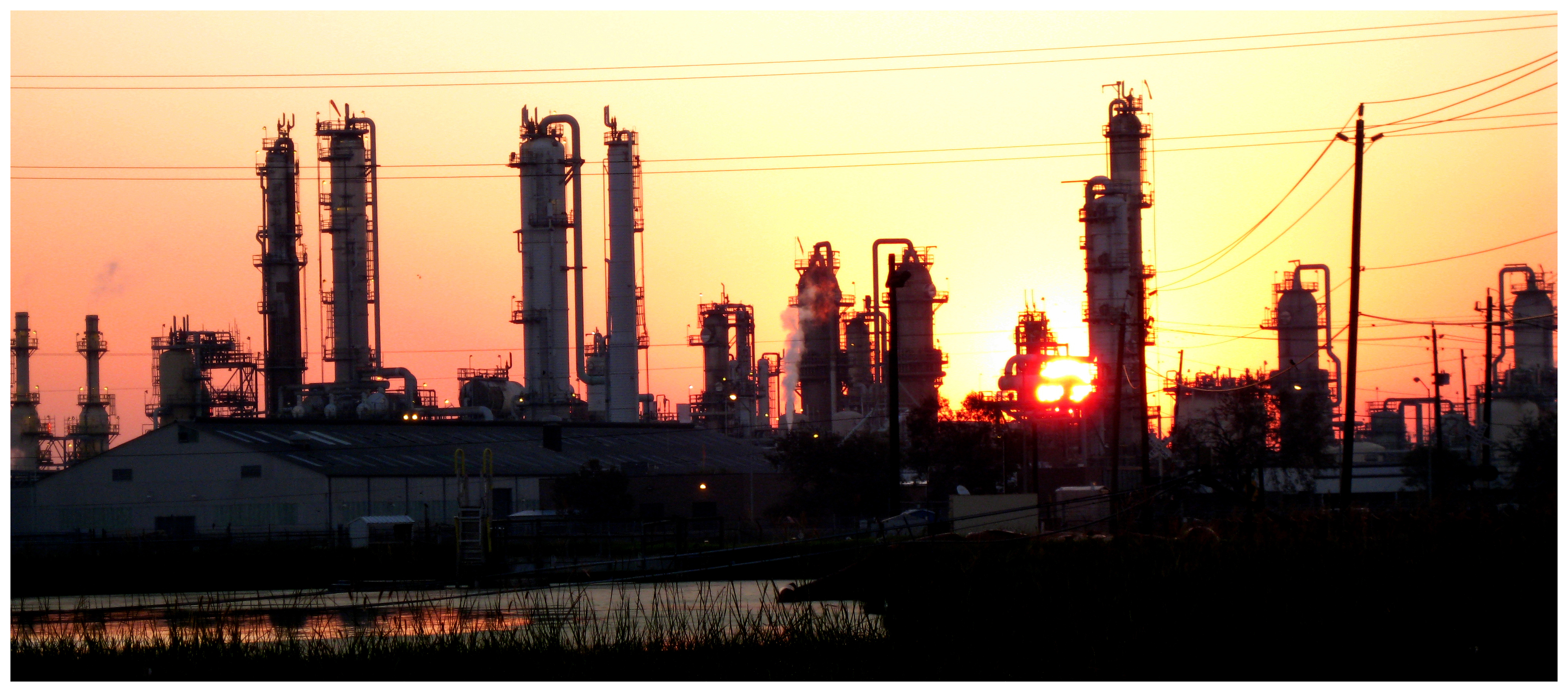
- The Baytown Refinery

- Location of the Baytown Refinery in Texas
- Location: Baytown, Texas, United States; 29.7390°N 95.0106°W

Refinery details
- Owner: ExxonMobil
- Opened: 1919
- Capacity: 588,000 barrels per day (93,500 m^{3}/d)
- Complexity index: 13.7

ExxonMobil's Baytown Refinery is a major oil refinery named after and located in Baytown, Texas. It has capacity of 588,000 barrels per day (93,500 m^{3}/d). The site first opened in 1919 and was originally operated by the Humble Oil Company. Today, it is the largest employer in the city. The plant has been expanded over the year to 3,400 acres (14 km^{2}) of land next to the Houston Ship Channel.

The Baytown Refinery is the fifth-largest refinery in the United States by production, after the nearby Port Arthur Refinery. Baytown is also ExxonMobil's third largest refinery, only trailing Exxon's Beaumont Refinery and Jurong Island refinery in Singapore.

== Units ==
According to ExxonMobil's filings with the US DOE's Energy Information Agency, the unit capacities for the Baytown Refinery are presented below:

Units	Capacity in BPCD
Total Refinery Nameplate	588,000
Atmospheric Distillation	588,000
Vacuum Distillation	297,000
Delayed Coking	54,000
Fluid Coking	42,000
FCC	220,000
Hydrocracking	30,600
Fuels Deasphalting (SDA)	47,000
Naphtha Reforming	126,500
Aklylation	44,500
ULSD Hydrotreating	158,300
Gasoline/Naphtha Hydrotreating	203,800
Kero Jet Hydrotreating	132,700
Naphtha Reformer Feed Hydrotreating	157,000
Heavy Gas Oil Hydrotreating	117,000
Lubricants	32,000

The refinery has a Nelson Complexity Index of 13.7, making it highly complex.

ExxonMobil is developing a large blue hydrogen facility at Baytown to support the refinery and sequester CO_{2}. The project is expected to capture and store 7 million mt of CO_{2} per year. The Abu Dhabi National Oil Company (ADNOC) purchased a 35% stake of this project in 2024.

The refinery site is also home to extensive petrochemical production including multi-train olefins production. The olefins plans are proposed to become users of blue hydrogen from the mega project being developed with ADNOC that will lower the petrochemical site's emissions by capturing 98% of the CO_{2} produced at the facility.

The refinery site has two electricity generating power plants.

Unit Name	Status	Fuel(s)	Capacity (MW)	Type	Combined Heat & Power	Year
Gen 4	Operating	Natural Gas	99	Gas Turbine	Yes	1997
Gen 5	Operating	Natural Gas	164	Gas Turbine	Yes	2004

The site has 3 worldscale ethylene cracking plants with the newest being commissioned in 2018 with 1.5 million tons per year of capacity and being fed with purity ethane.

Total ethylene cracking capacity for the site is currently 3.6 million tons per year and is presented in the table below by unit as presented in the Oil & Gas Journal Survey of Steam Crackers.

Steam Cracker(s)	Capacity in Mtpa	Feed 1	Feed 2
3	1.5	Ethane	
1 & 2	2.2	Ethane	LPG

The refinery has several polymerization units that consume the olefins generated on site.

== Greenhouse gas emissions history ==
As a major emitting facility, The ExxonMobil Baytown Refinery and Petrochemical Site must report its complete greenhouse gas emissions to the EPA every year subject to the EPA's Greenhouse Gas Reporting Program. The Baytown site's Facility ID is 1007542 and its FRS ID is 110000463178.

Statutory reporting data is in the table below:

Year	Total Reported Direct Emissions	CO2 Emissions Non-Biogenic	Methane Emissions	Nitrous Oxide Emissions
	metric ton	metric ton	metric ton	metric ton
2023	12,693,547	12,621,516	39,860	32,171

All emissions data is presented in units of metric tons of carbon dioxide equivalent using GWP's from IPCC's AR4

According the EPA's database for 2022, the Baytown (combined site) ranked as the 6th largest GhG emitter in the United States for 2023 with 12.6 million tons of emissions.

== Operating permits ==
The refinery is a major facility that operates under the Clean Air and Clean Water Acts, in addition to RCRA and other statutes. The sites FRS ID is 110000502901.

Major permits are detailed in the chart below and can be found on the EPA's website here and at the state level.

Program	ID Type	ID Number	ID Status
AIR OPERATING PERMITS	PERMIT	4614	CANCELLED
AIR OPERATING PERMITS	PERMIT	1229	PENDING

== Labor relations ==
The Baytown site is a union facility with the United Steelworkers Local 13-2001 representing operations, instrument, lab and mechanical employees. The membership is approximately 600. In addition to the USW, three other unions represent workers at the site including:

- International Association of Machinists and Aerospace Workers
- Machinists, Lodge 1051 with 86 members
- International Brotherhood of Electrical Workers

=== Labor history ===
Labor relations have, at times, been contentious at the Baytown refinery. A long-standing dispute at the Beaumont Refinery, led to accusations of ExxonMobil attempting to decertify the USW at the site.

== Operating history and accidents ==
On December 23, 2021, a large explosion occurred at the refinery in what was described as a major industrial accident by both local and national news. The explosion, caused by a fire, occurred around 1AM and seriously injured five workers, four of whom were airlifted to the hospital with one being transported by ambulance. No fatalities were reported. Two of the injured contract workers have filed a $10 million lawsuit against ExxonMobil and partner Team Industrial Services for unsafe working conditions as of a result of the explosion.

A July 31, 2019 fire in a polymerization unit occurred when a popcorn polymer built up in a line and ruptured, causing a fireball reaching 900 feet into the air. After a 3 week jury trial, a verdict of responsibility was won for the plaintiffs resulting in $28.5 million in damages for compensation for 5 injured workers.

Despite the accidents, the Baytown Refinery is regarded to be a well-run refinery that has won several awards in process and personal safety. The chemical and olefins units at the refinery each won the AFPM Elite Gold Safety Award in 2023.

The refinery's Operations team set a record for OHSA performance regarding safety of 18 years without a recordable injury according to a 2024 press release from the SEA Conference:

With an impressive record of over 18 years and 11.2 million work hours without an OSHA-recordable injury, our Baytown team sets the industry standard in safety and operational excellence.

== See also ==
- Atmospheric Distillation
- HF Acid Alkylation
- Cracking
- Delayed Coking
- Naphtha Reforming
- Hydrotreating
- Fluid Coking
- Solvent Deasphalting of Crude Oil
