= Cornelius Elementary School =

Cornelius Elementary School can refer to:

- Cornelius Elementary School (Texas)
- Cornelius Elementary School - Cornelius, North Carolina - Charlotte-Mecklenburg Schools
