= List of Houston Independent School District elementary schools =

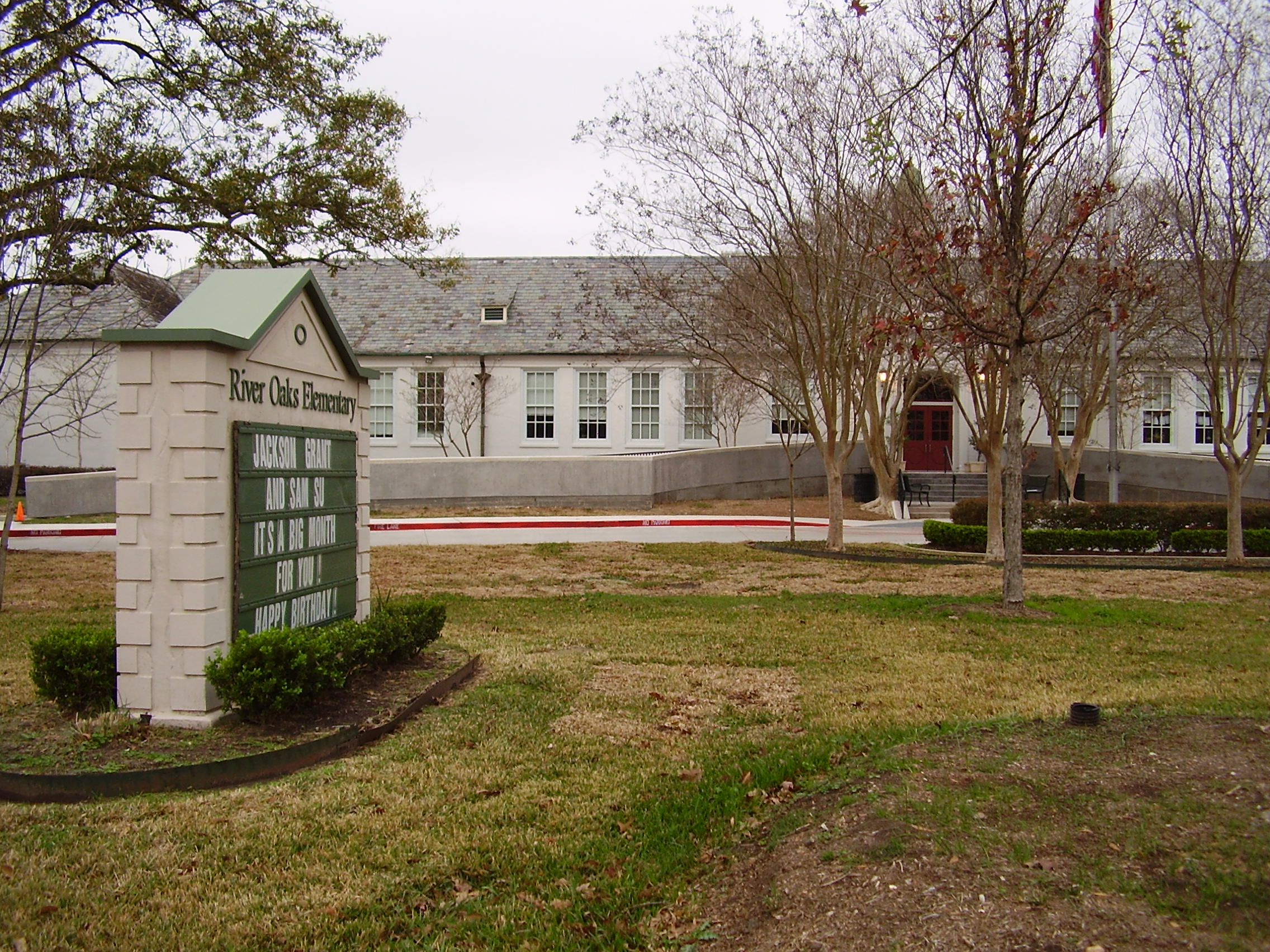
River Oaks Elementary School

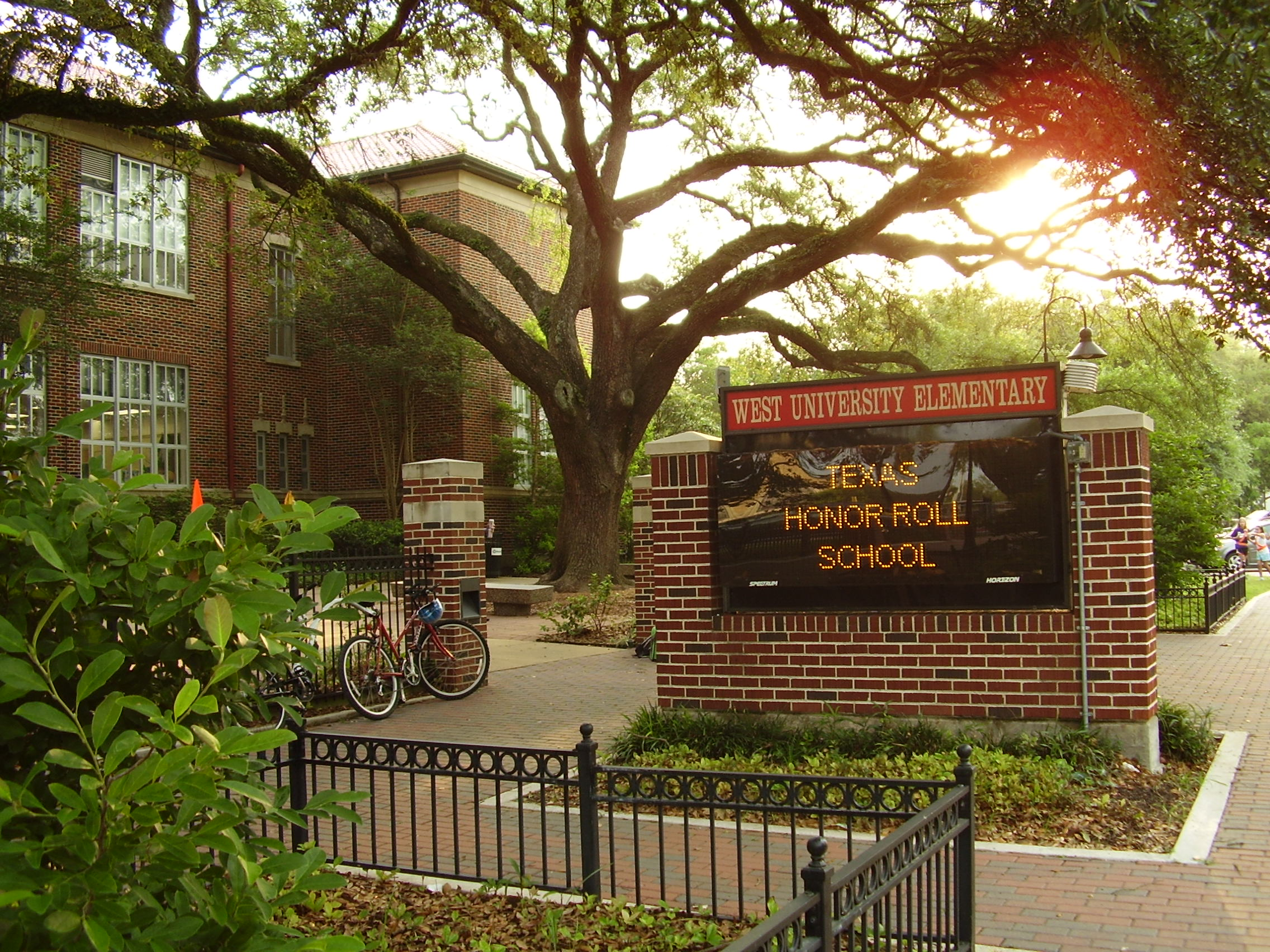
West University Elementary School in West University Place

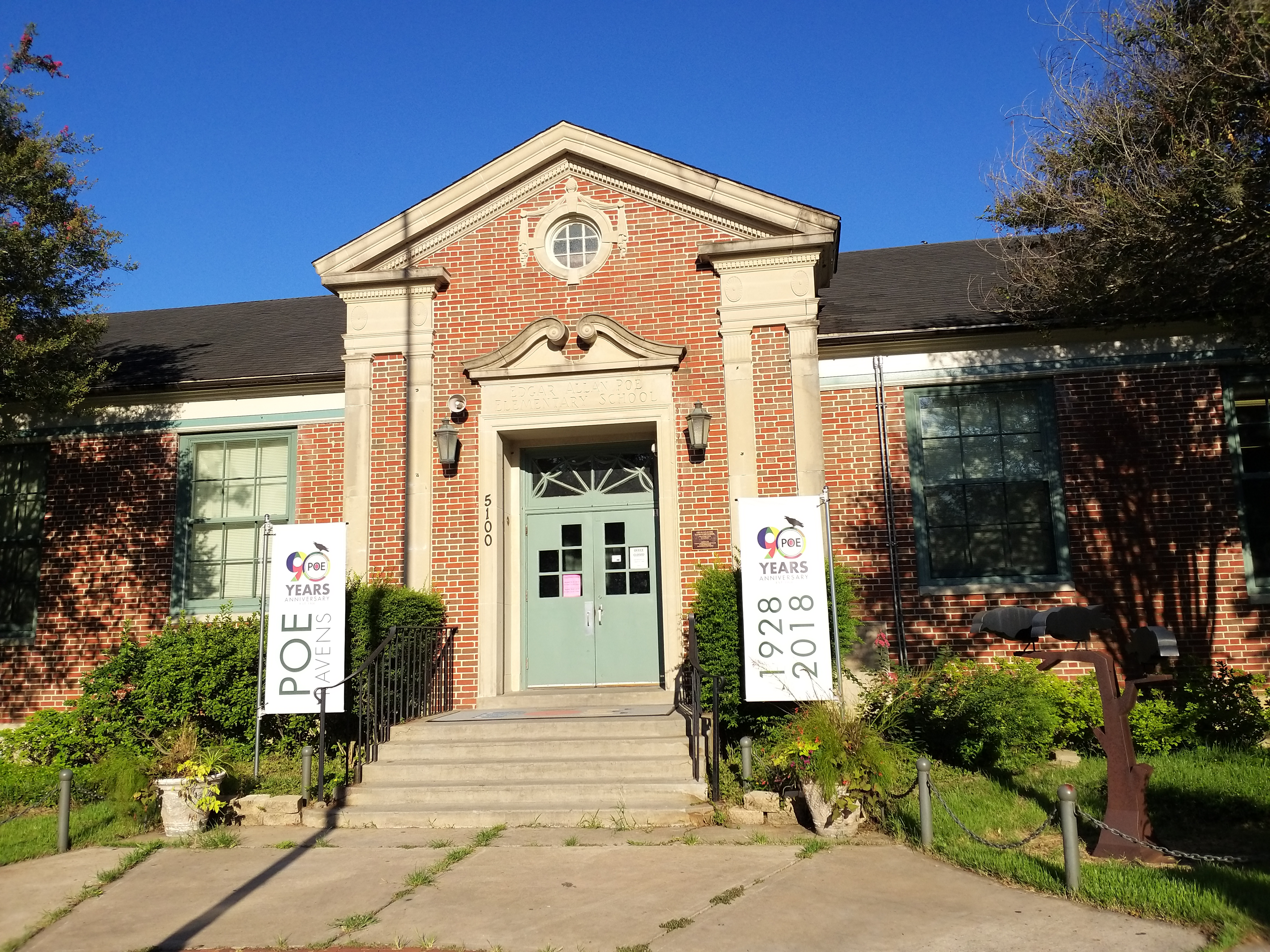
Poe Elementary School

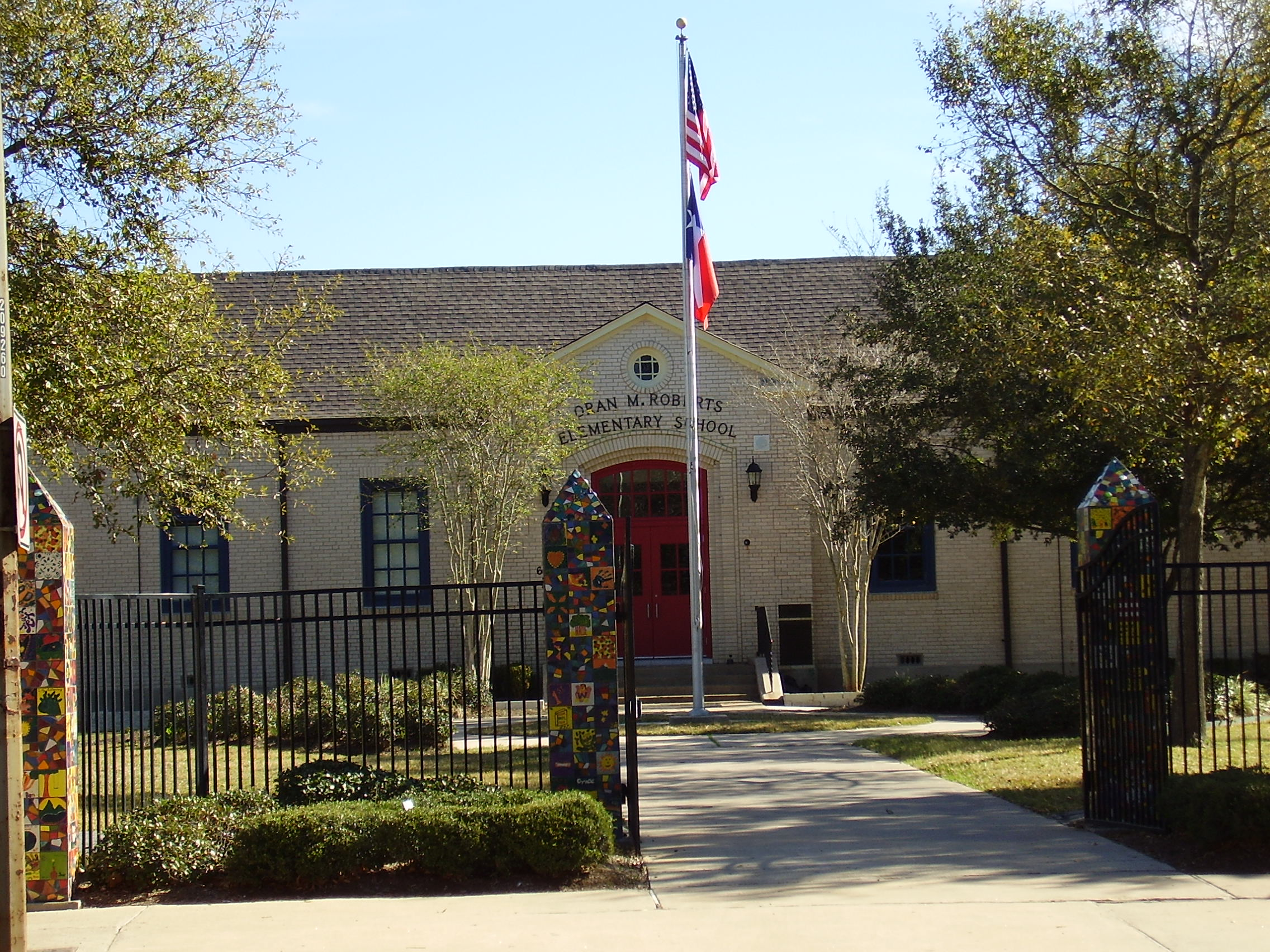
Roberts Elementary School in Southgate

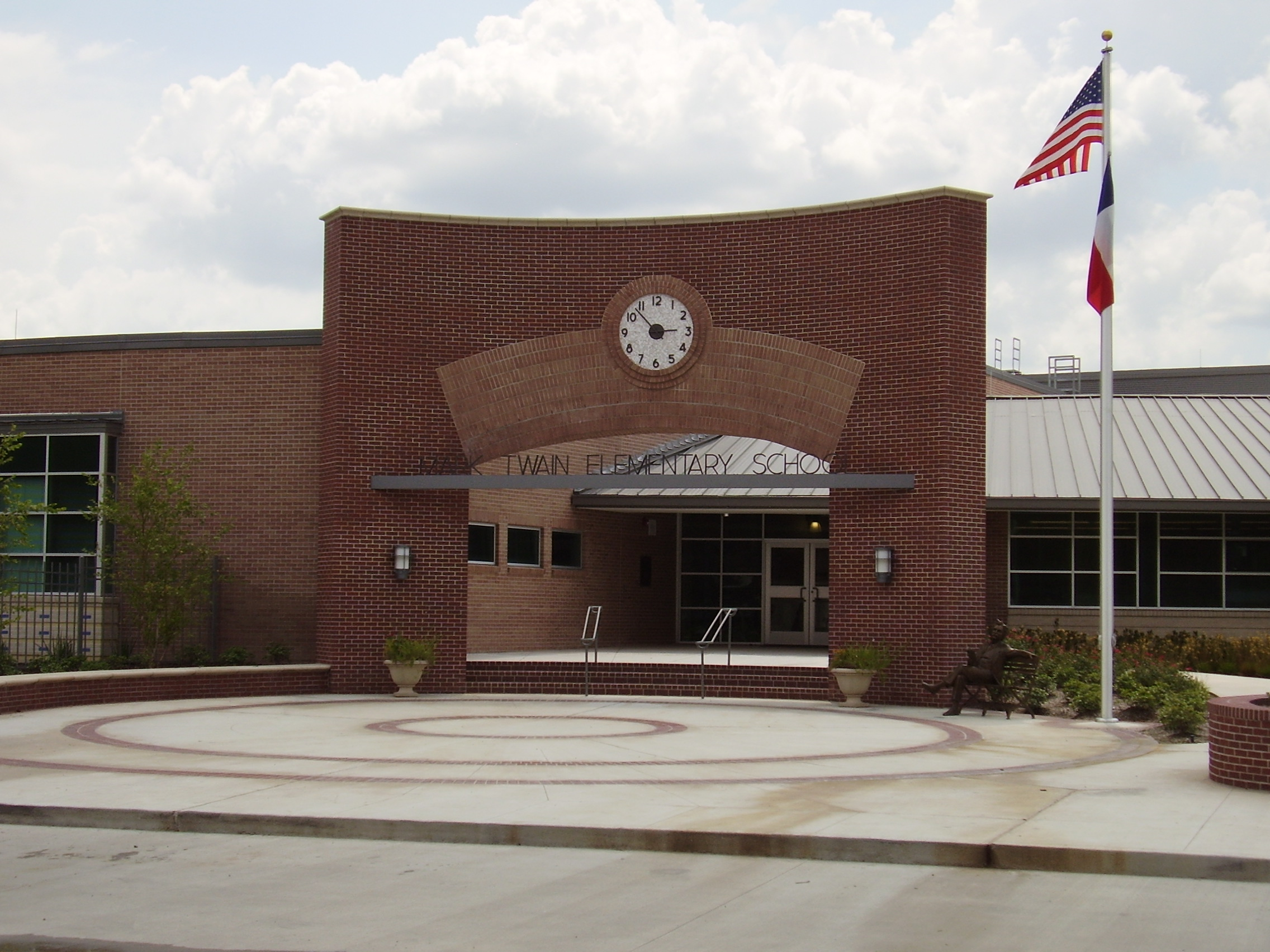
Mark Twain Elementary School in Braeswood Place

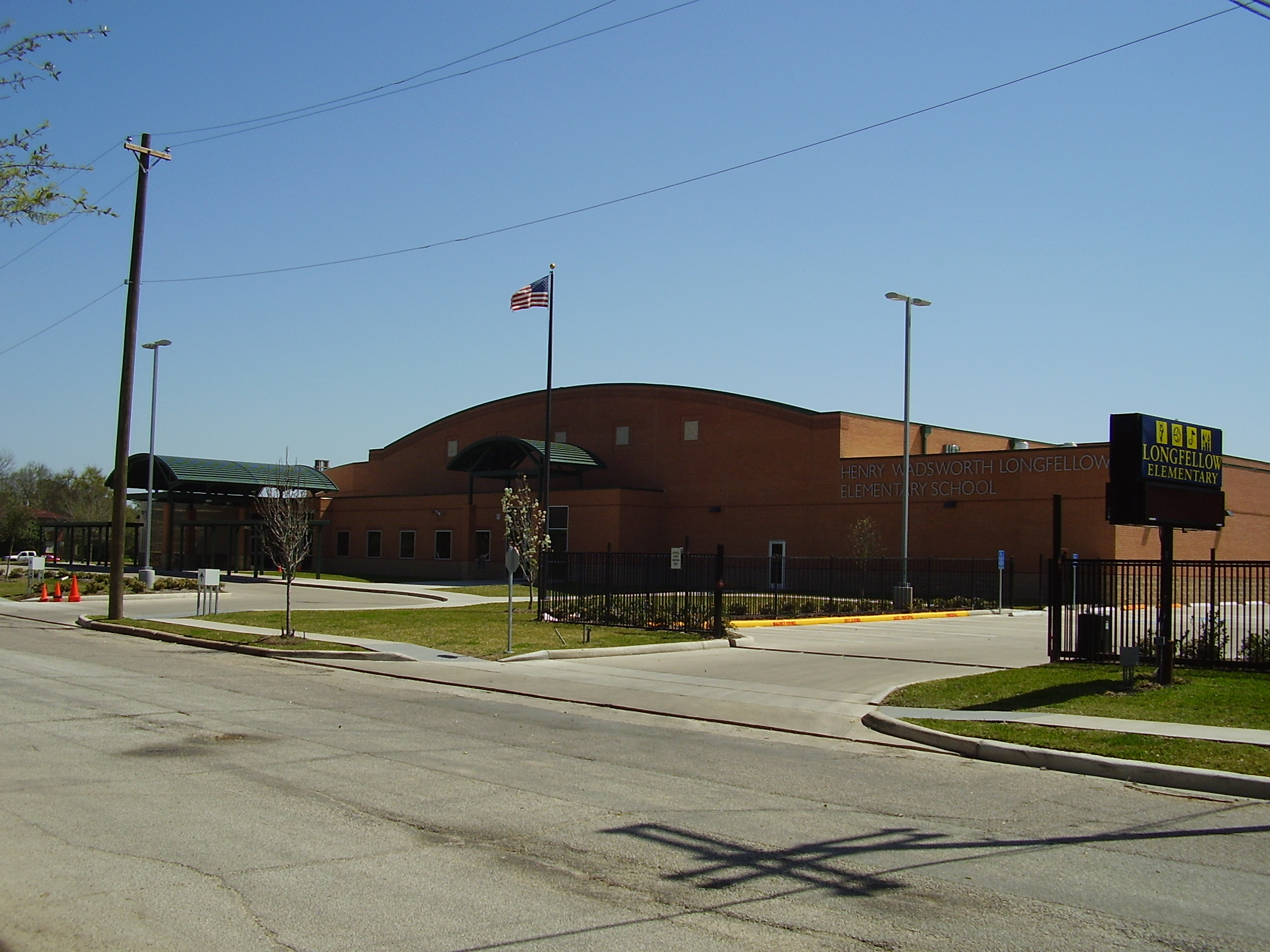
Longfellow Elementary School in Braeswood Place

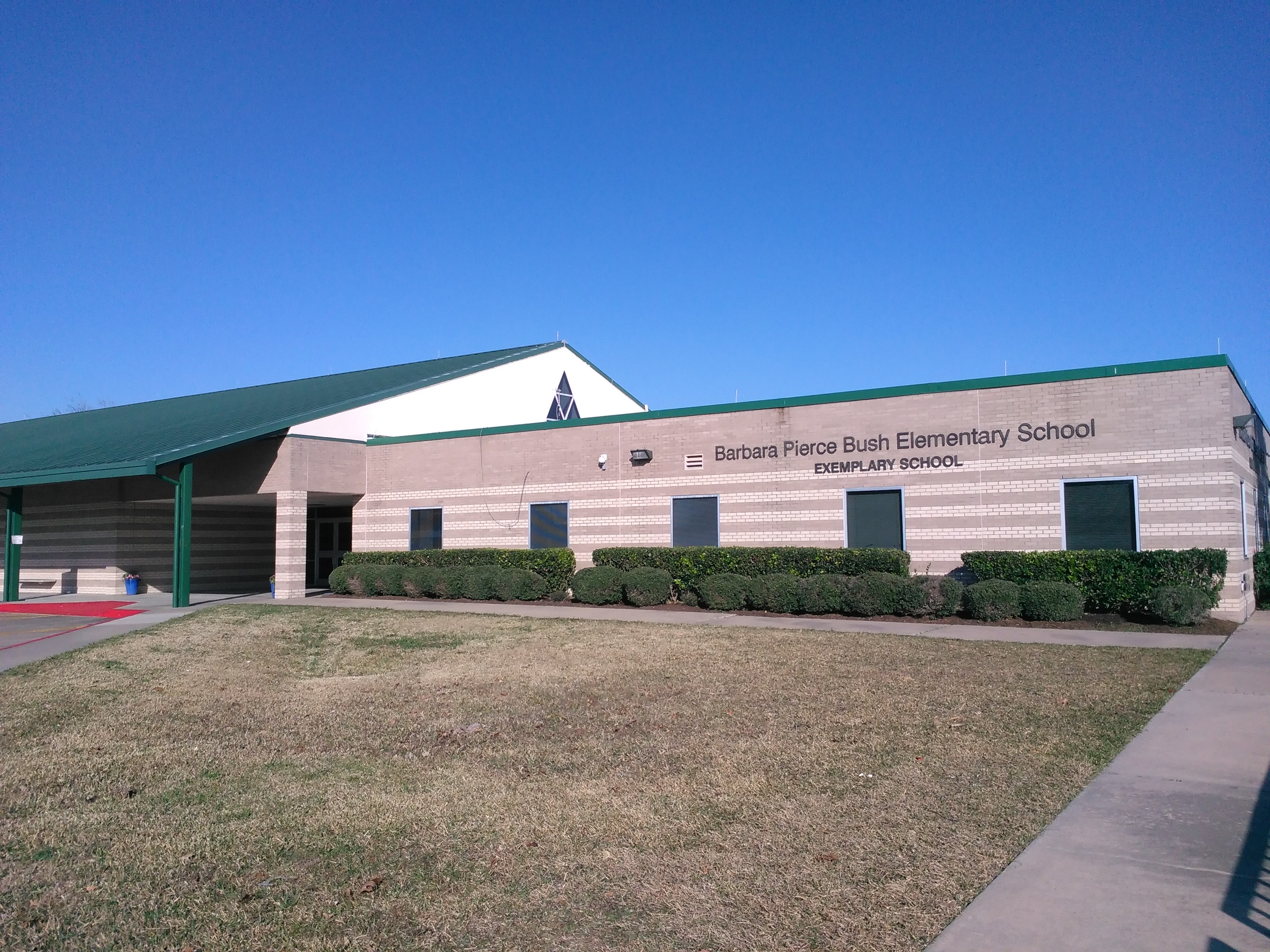
Barbara Bush Elementary School in Parkway Villages

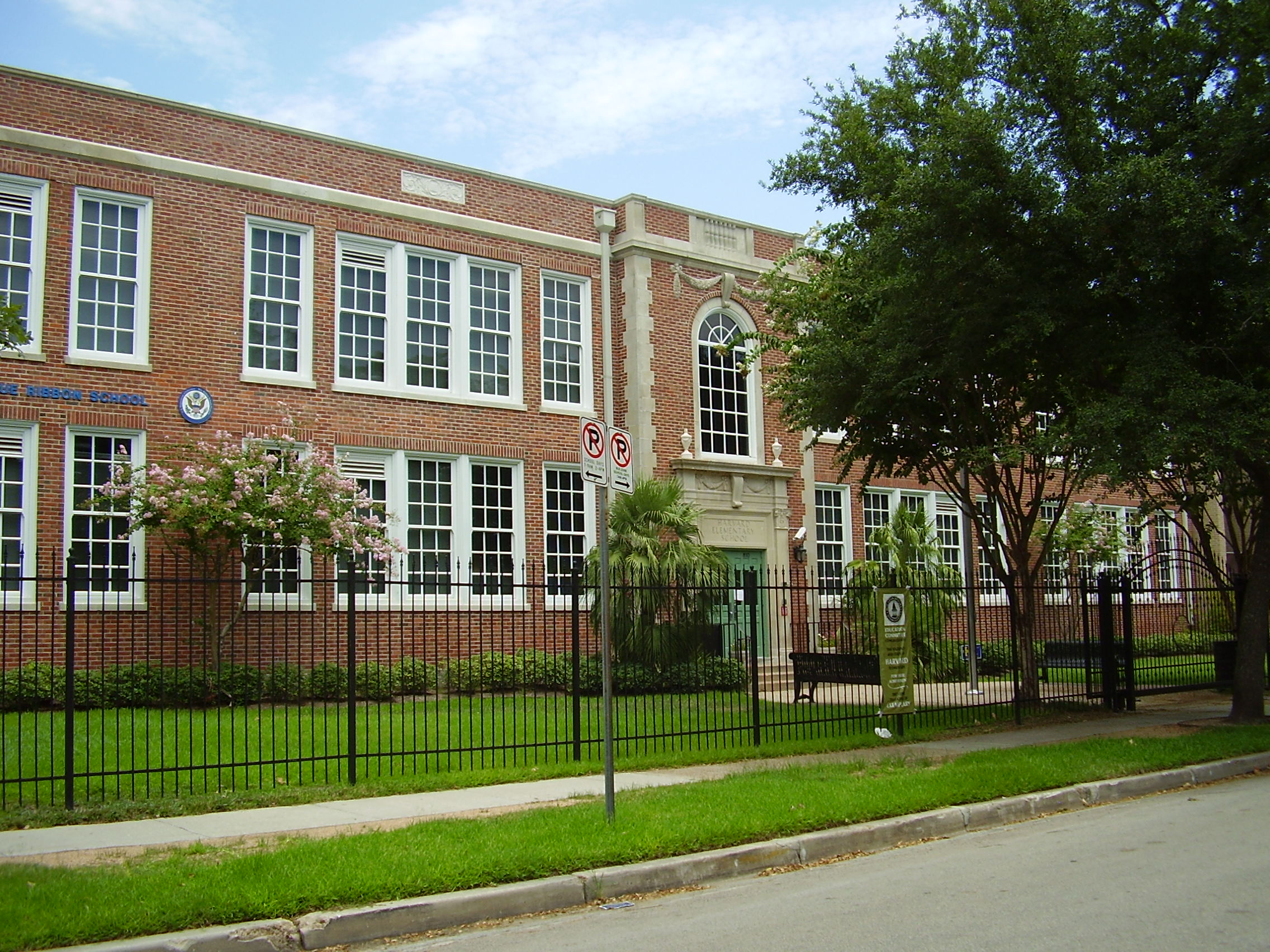
Harvard Elementary School

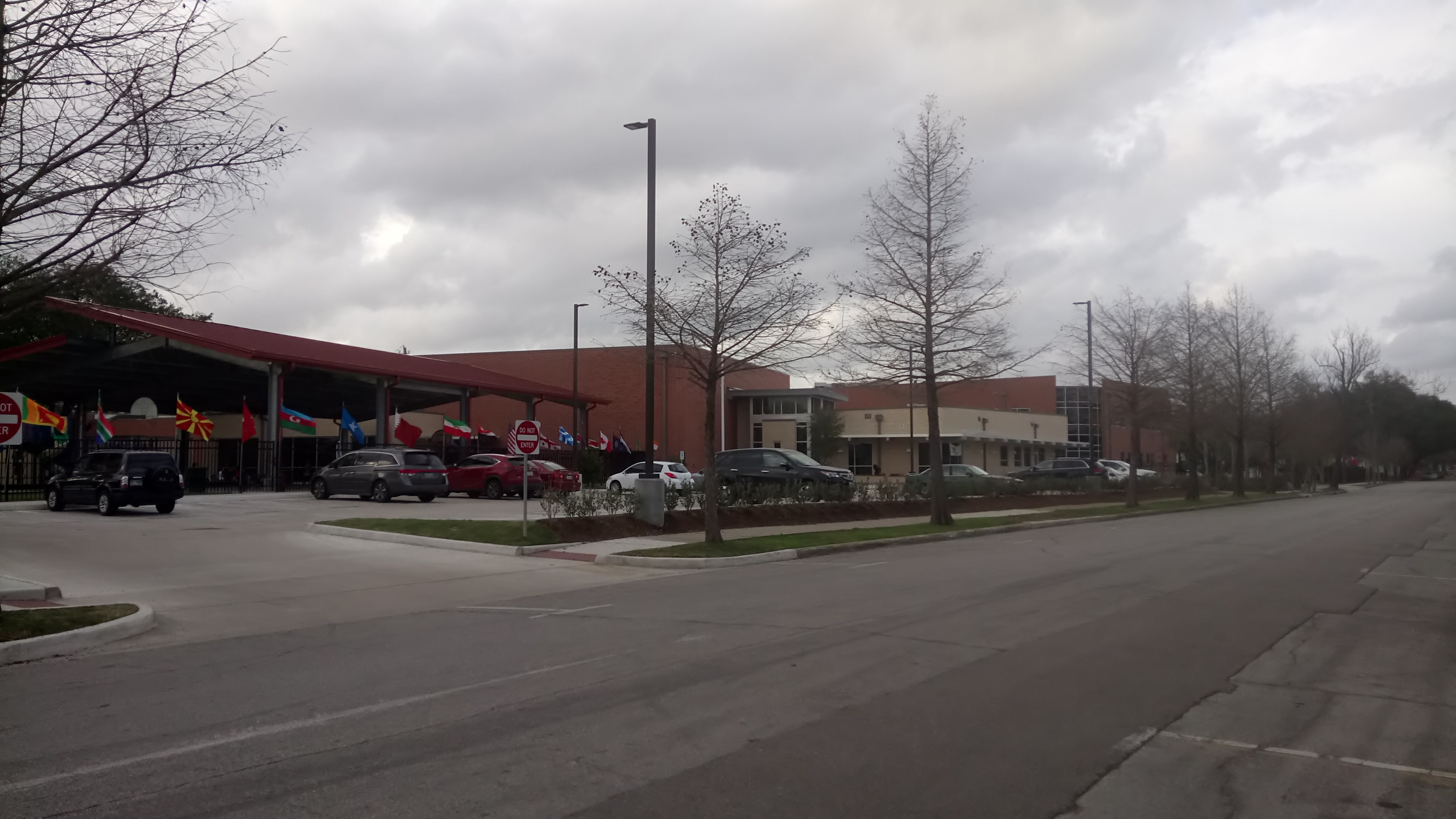
Condit Elementary School in Bellaire

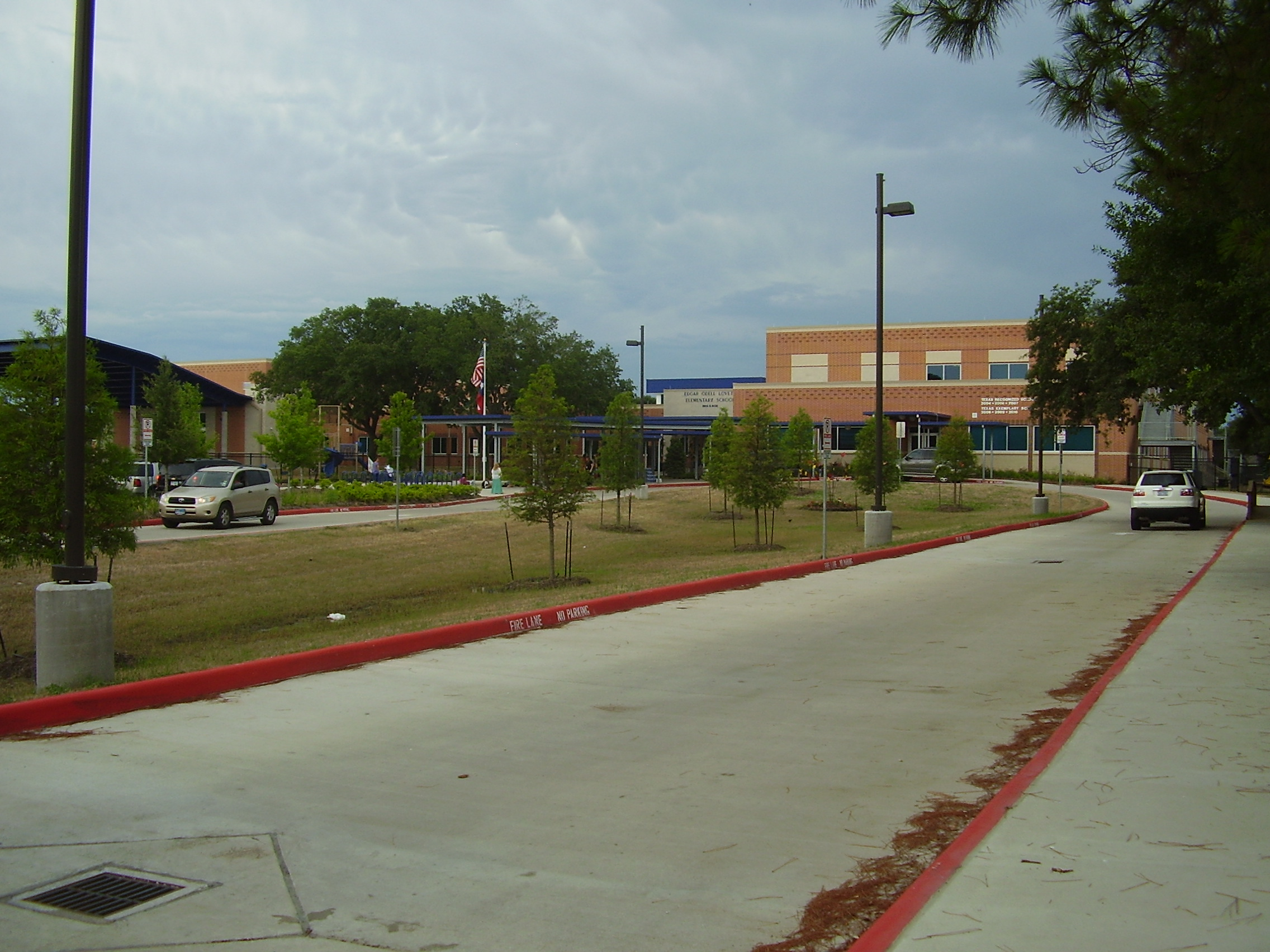
Lovett Elementary School in Meyerland

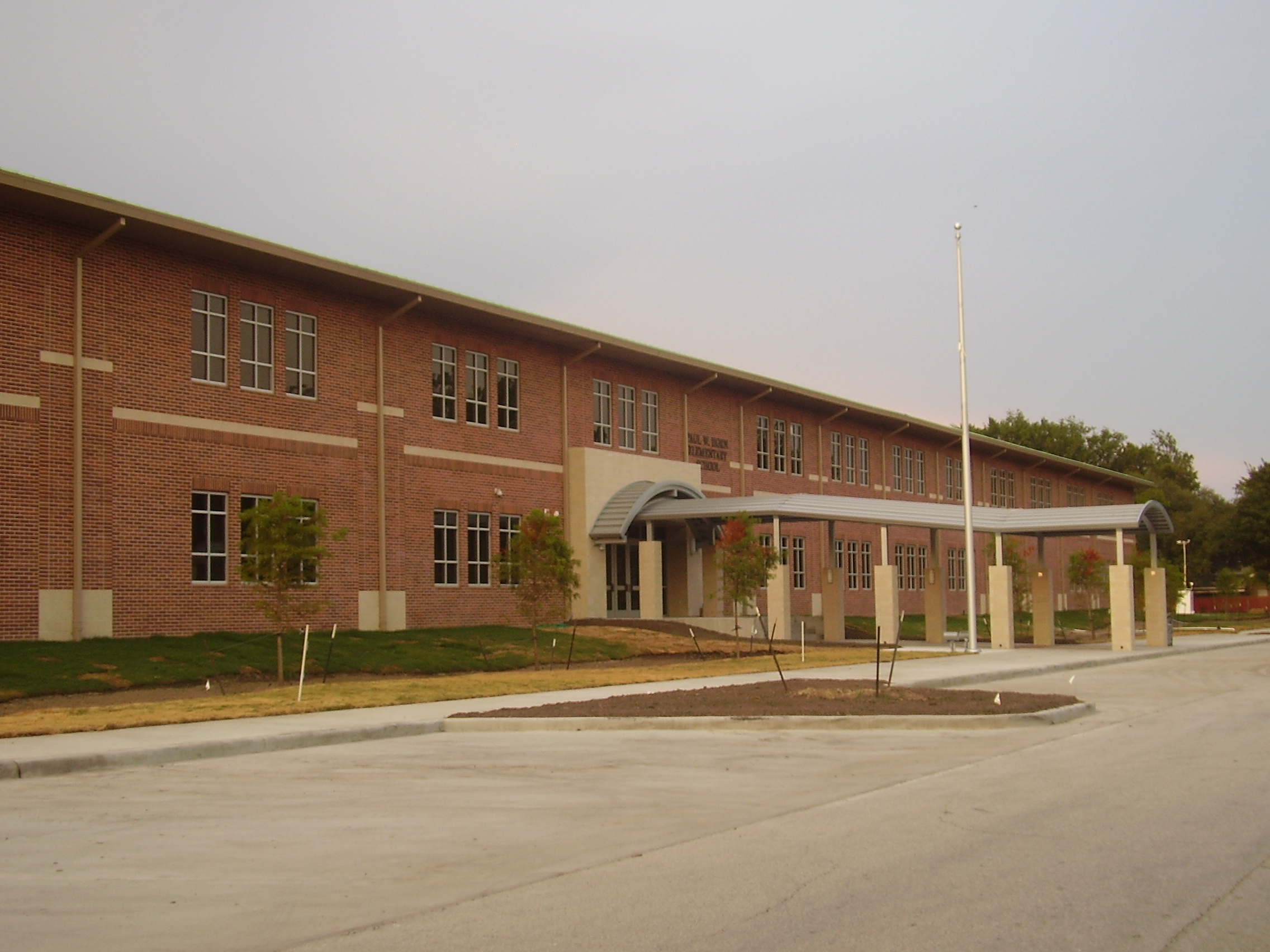
Horn Academy in Bellaire

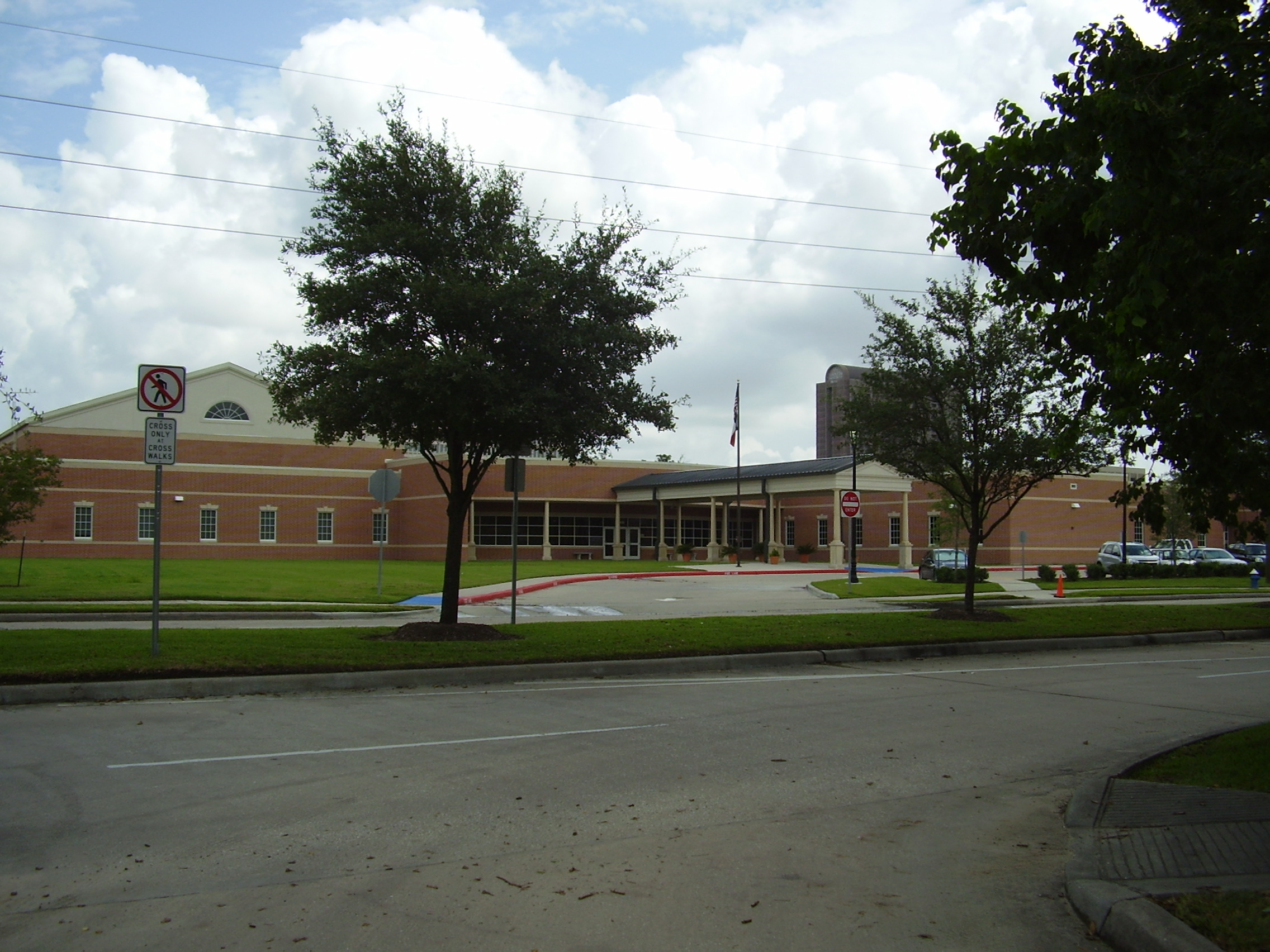
St. George Place Elementary School in St. George Place

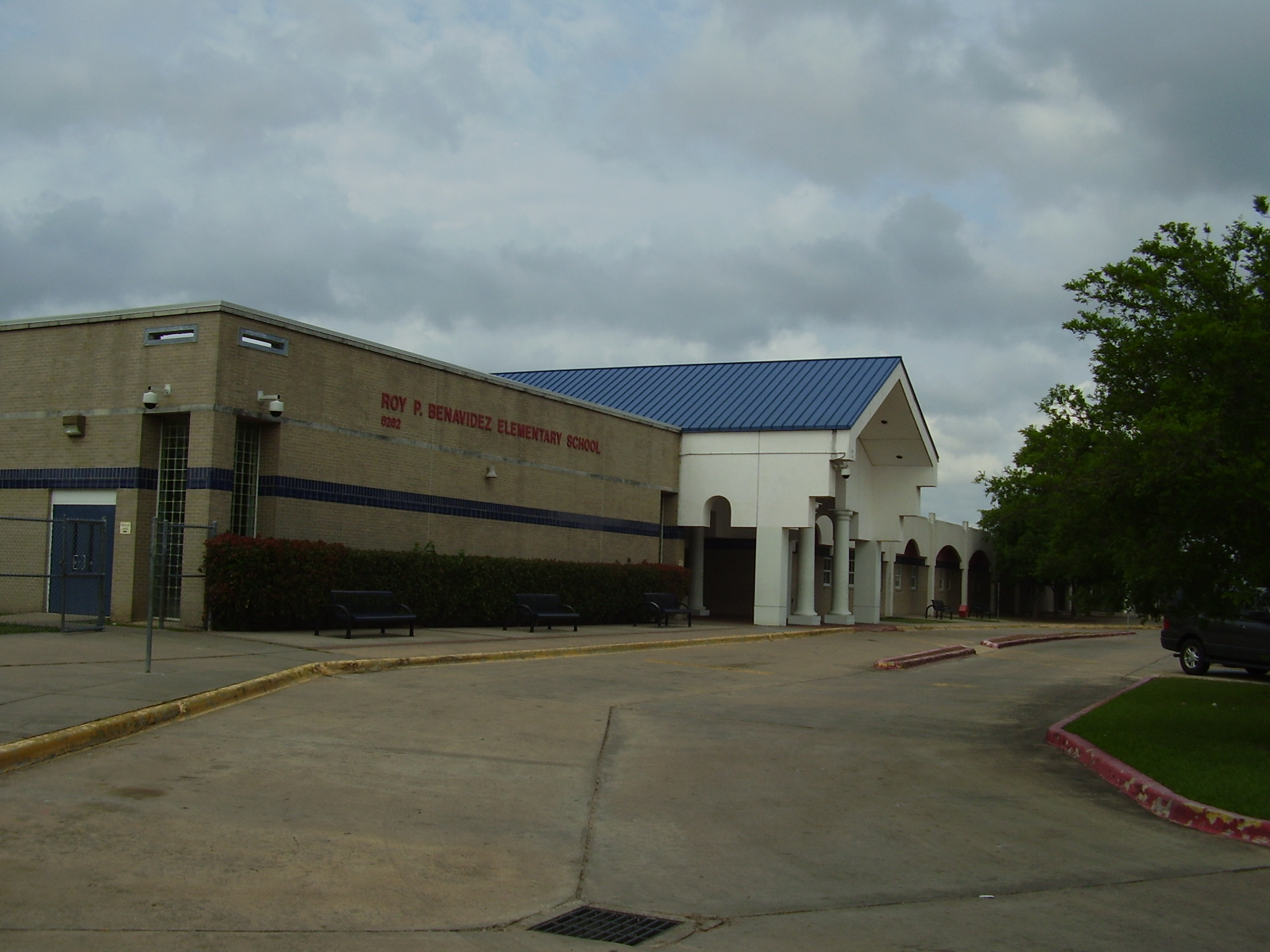
Benavidez Elementary School in Gulfton

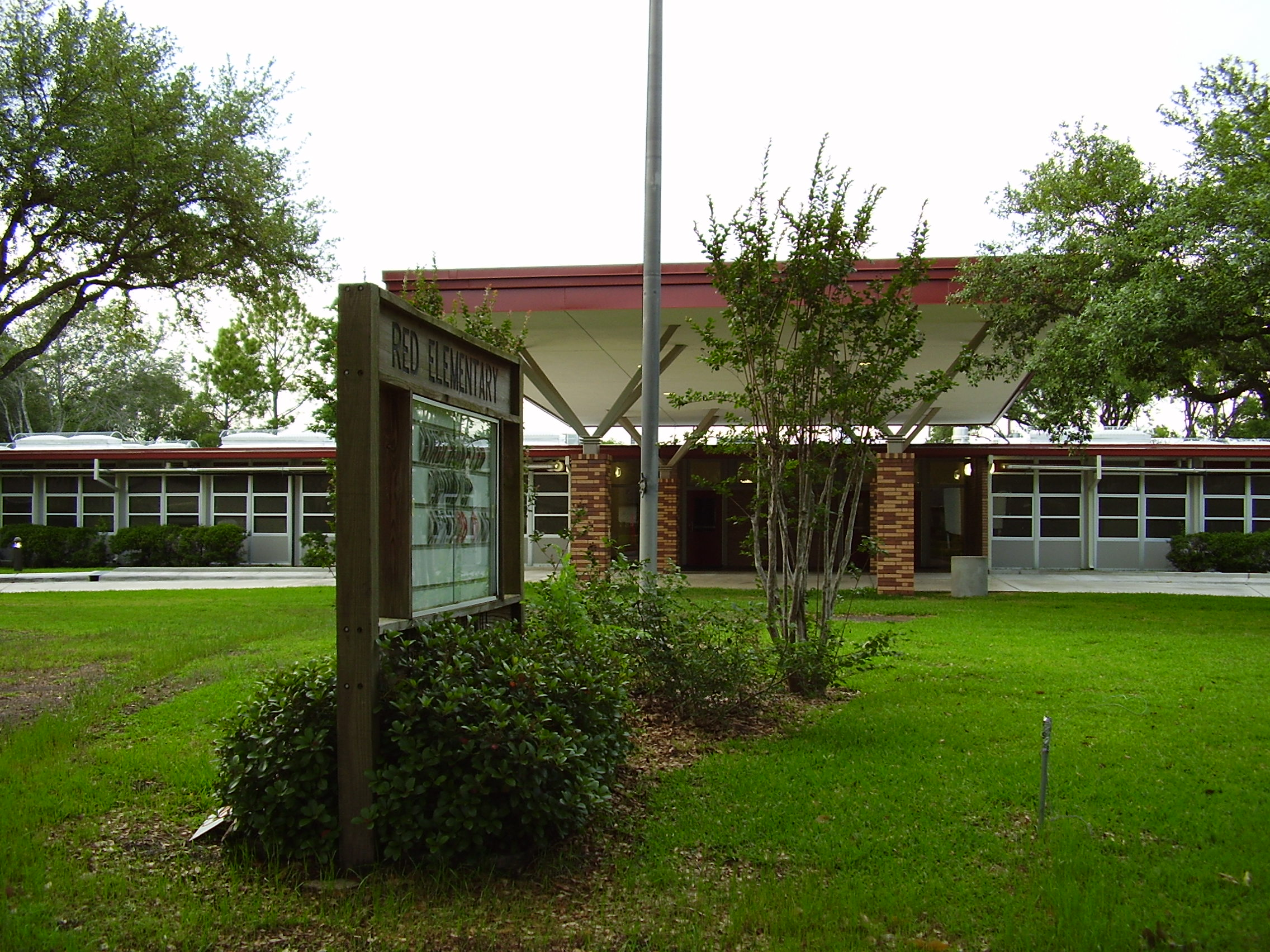
Red Elementary School in Willowbend

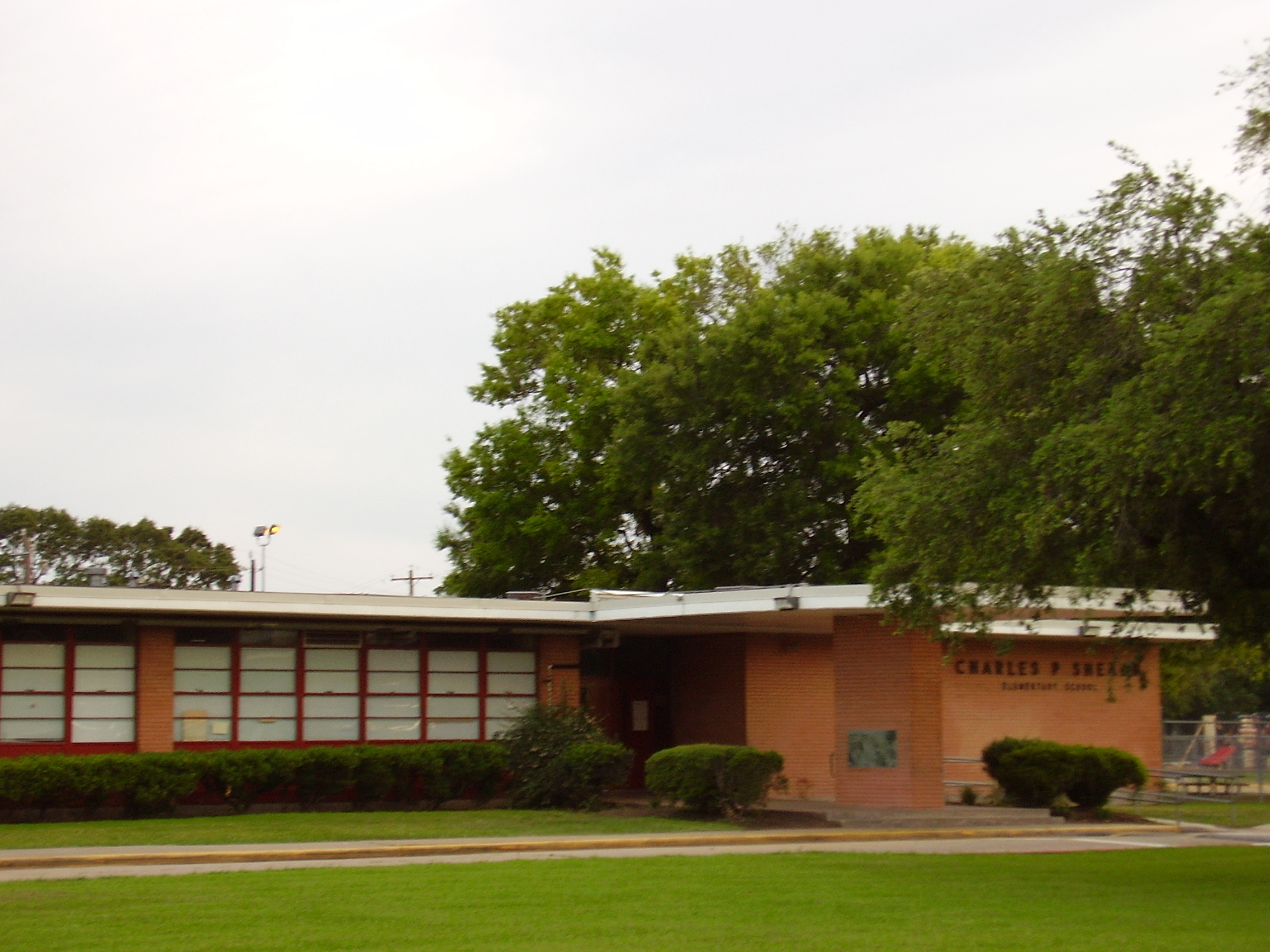
Shearn Elementary School in Westwood

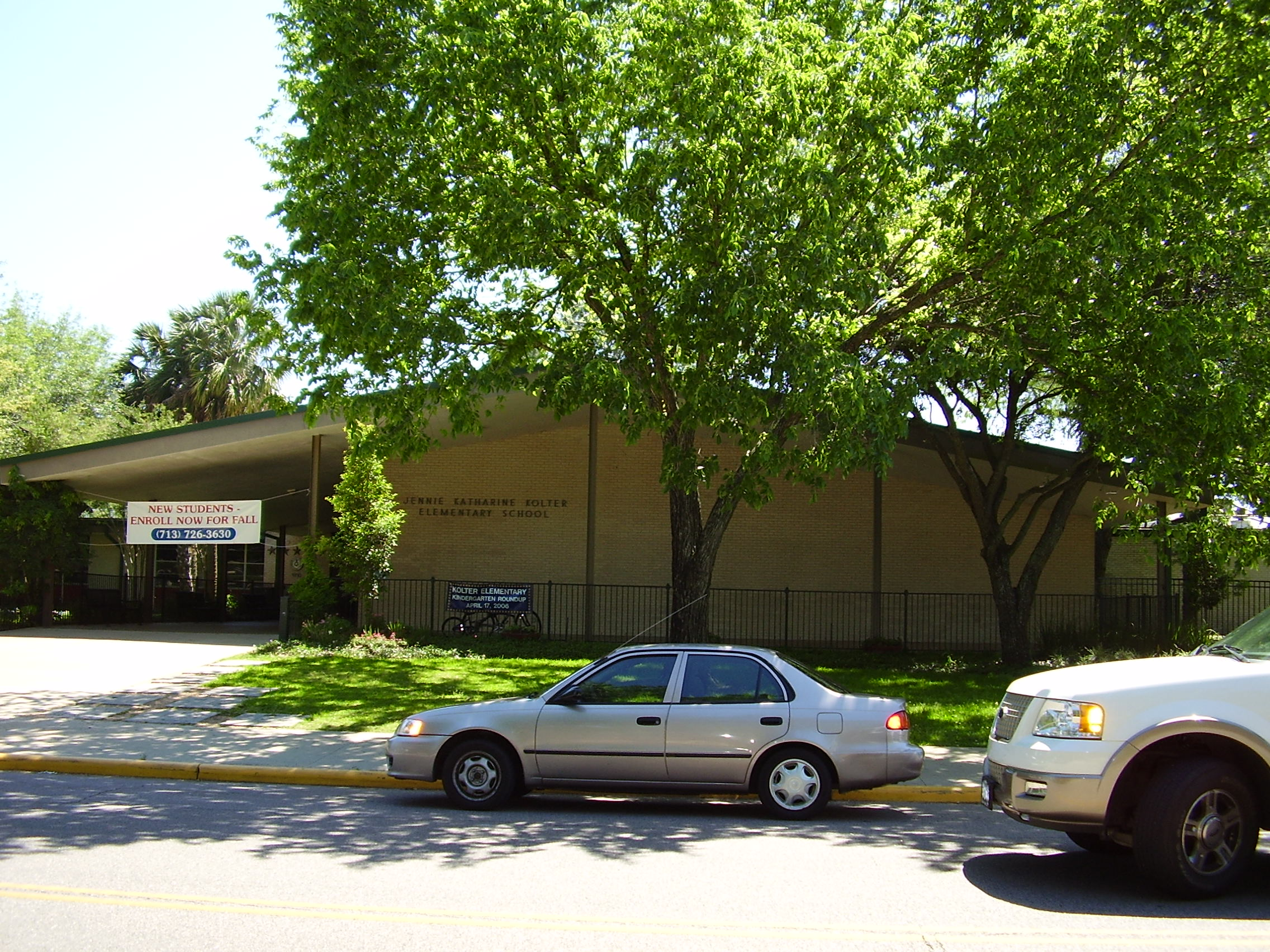
Kolter Elementary School in Meyerland

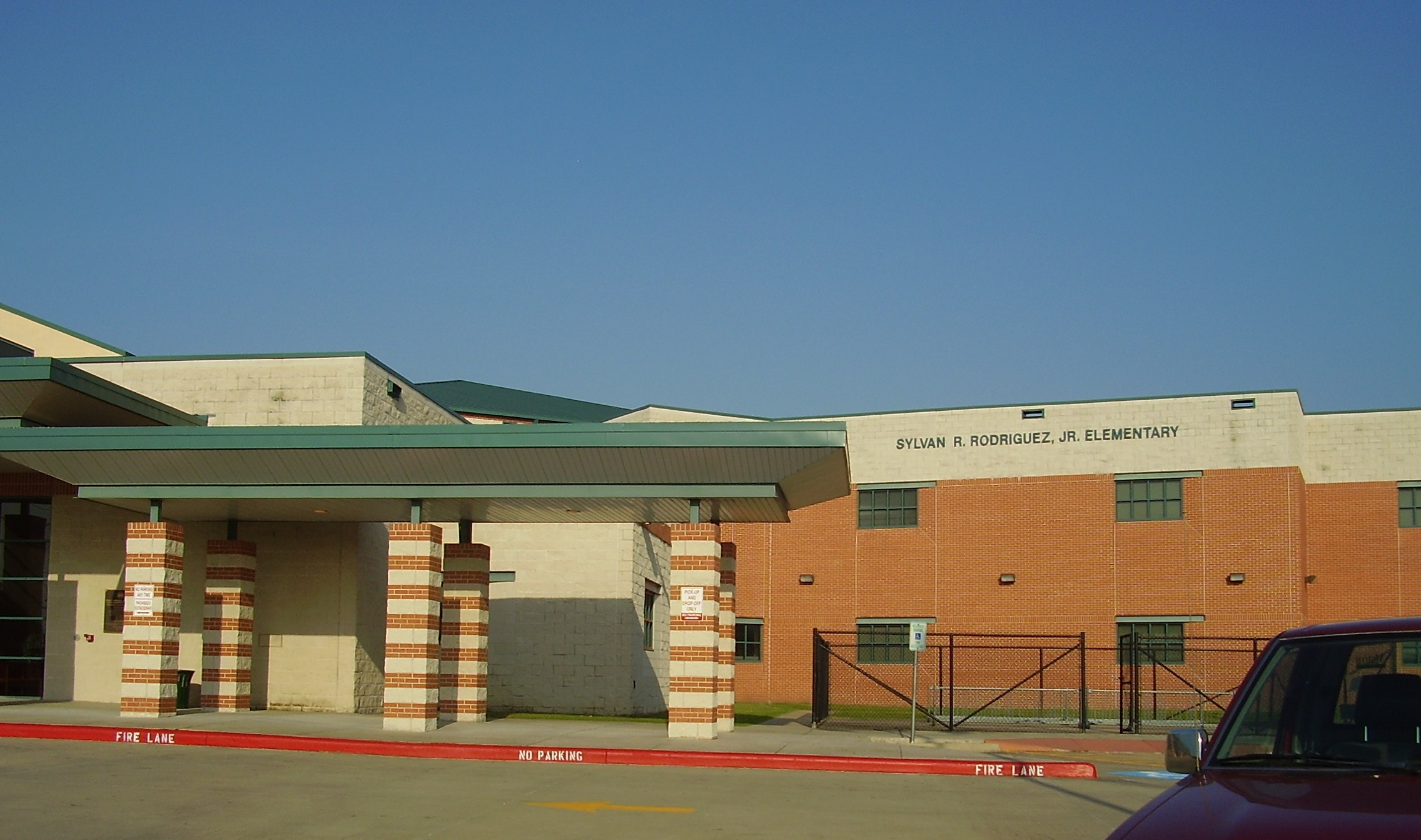
Rodríguez Elementary School in Gulfton

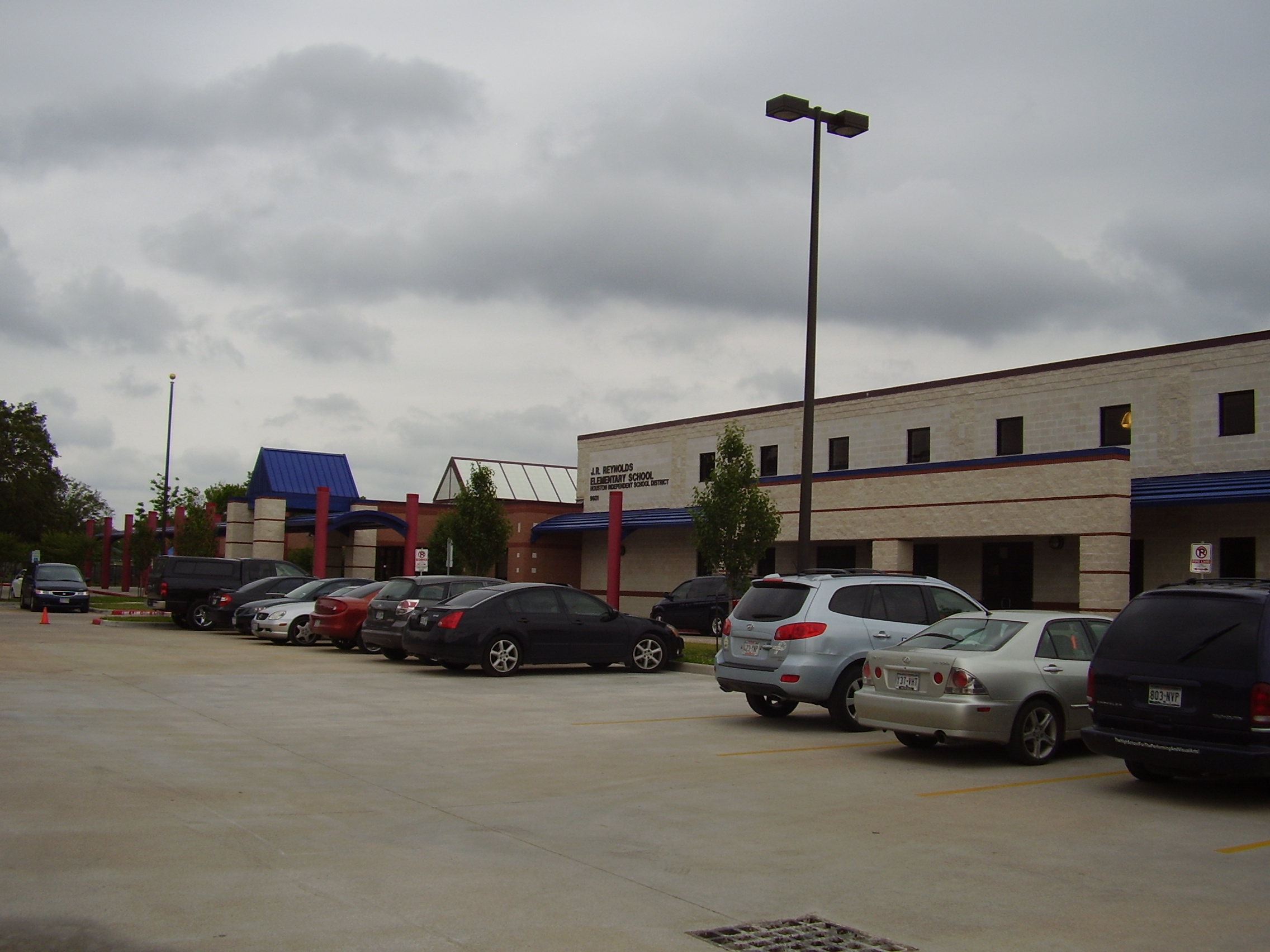
Reynolds Elementary School

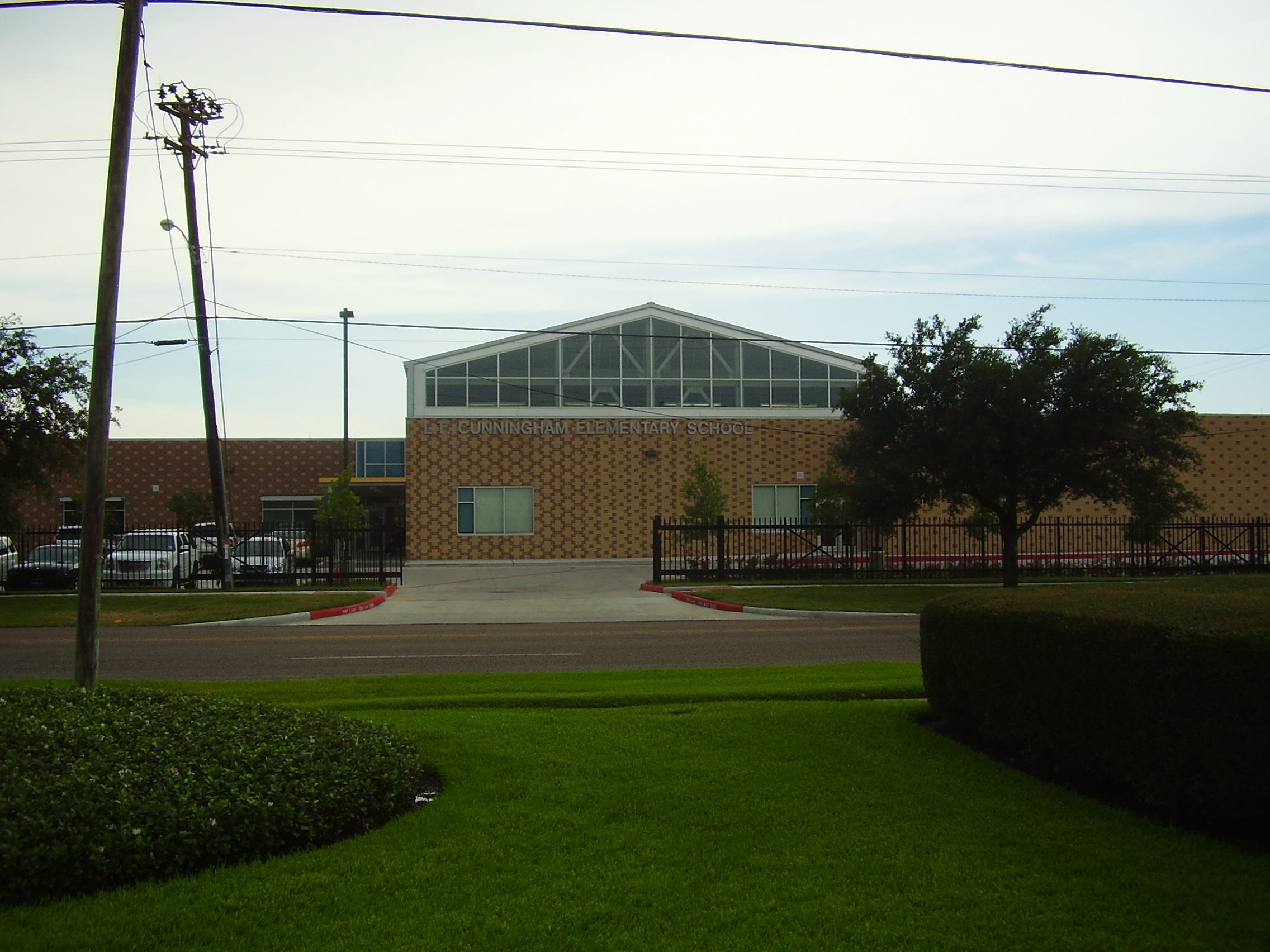
Cunningham Elementary School

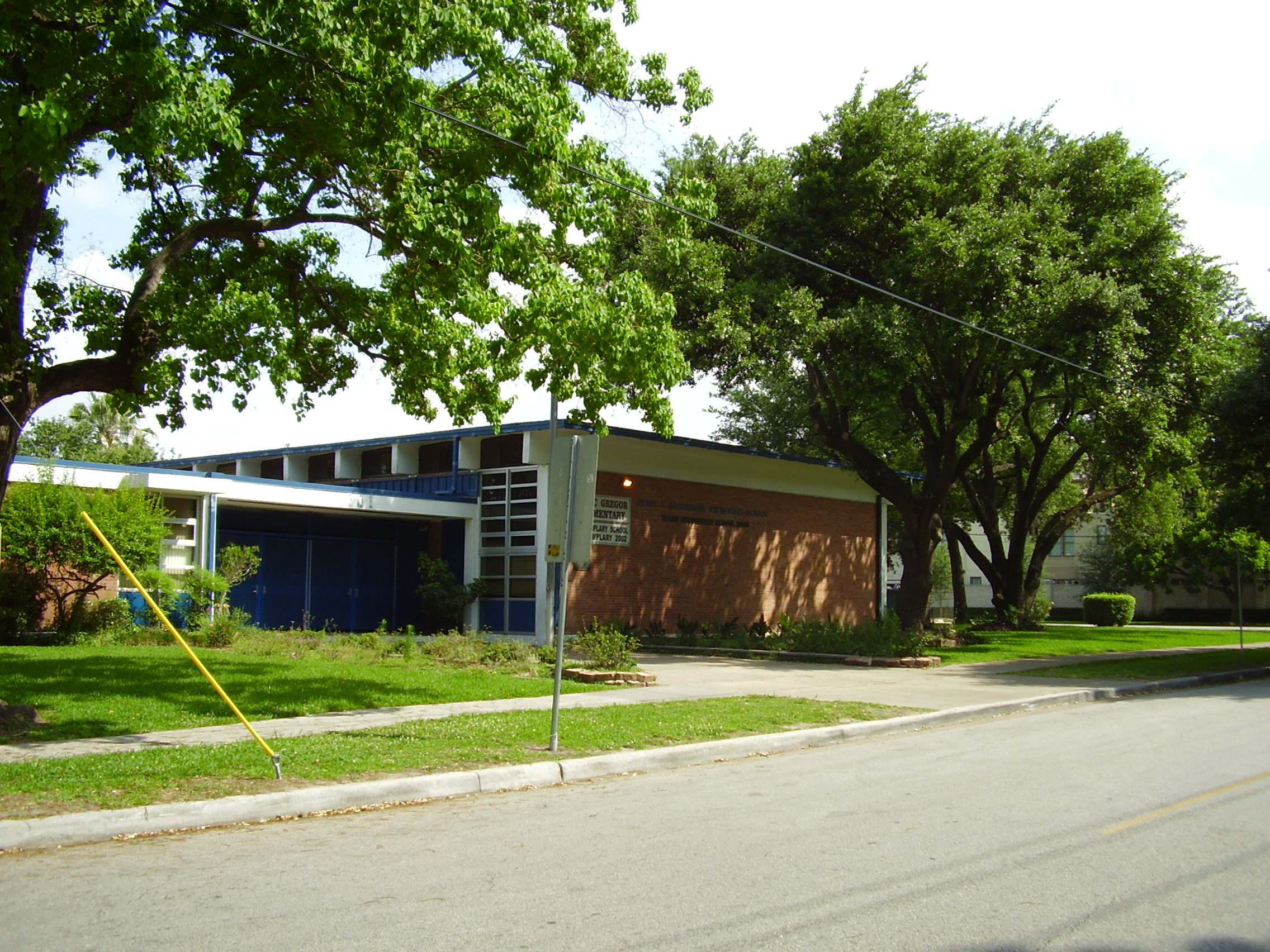
MacGregor Elementary School

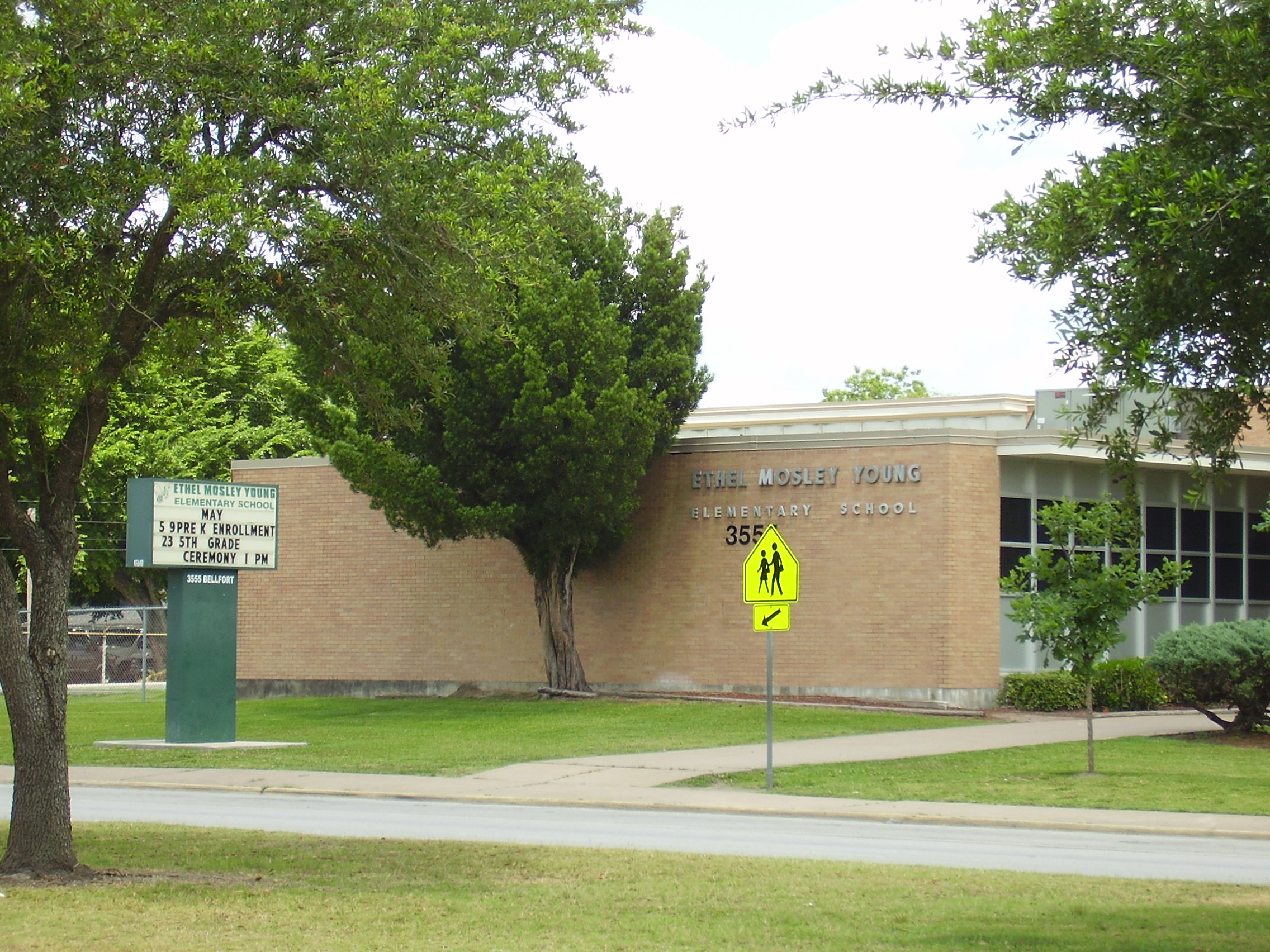
Young Elementary School in Sunnyside

This list includes Houston Independent School District schools that only house the elementary school level. For other schools (including K-8 schools which were previously elementary only), see List of Houston Independent School District schools.

== Traditional elementary schools ==
- Louisa May Alcott Elementary School (Houston)(Owls)
  - Serves portions of South Park
- Almeda Elementary School (Houston)(Bobcats)
  - Serves portions of Almeda, and City Park
  - As of 1998, 60% of the students were Hispanic and Latino. Since 1994 and as of 1998 the school used the "Success For All" reading program for its English language classes. For bilingual English-Spanish classes it used "Exito Para Todos," the Spanish version. As of the same year, many parents have some English fluency, but take English classes four days per week in order to improve it.
- Ralph Andy Anderson Elementary School (Houston)(Panthers)
  - This school serves a section of Westbury
  - Anderson, initially with a capacity of 600, had it increase to 900 as a new wing opened in 1963. In the late 1990s Anderson Elementary was overcrowded due to increasing student populations in Westbury area apartment complexes. In 1996 there were 1,500 students; an additional 300 had been re-assigned to other schools. In 1998 the school had almost 1,600 students. Around that time hundreds of students who were zoned to Anderson were bussed to relief campuses.
- Ashford Elementary School (Houston) (Grades Pre-Kindergarten through 2)(Eagles)
  - The campus was built to hold 540 students. In 1992 the school had 1,052. Bush Elementary opened that year to relieve Ashford.
- Jewel Askew Elementary School (Houston) (Grades Pre-Kindergarten through 4)
- Charles H. Atherton Elementary School (Houston)
  - Serves portions of the Fifth Ward
  - By Spring 2011 Atherton and E.O. Smith were scheduled to be consolidated, with a K-8 new campus in the Atherton site.
- C. E. Barrick Elementary School (Houston, opened 1949 as Alber-Canino Elementary School)
- Mamie Sue Bastian Elementary School(Houston)
  - Serves portions of South Park
- Kate Bell Elementary School (Houston)
  - Serves a section of Missouri City
- Roy P. Benavidez Elementary School (Houston)
  - This school serves portions of Gulfton
  - Benavidez opened to relieve Cunningham Elementary School; Immediately prior to the opening of Benavidez, Cunningham had 1,400 students. Benavidez Elementary School, which opened on Tuesday January 21, 1992, relieved Cunningham of around 675 students and 29 teachers. Benavidez, along with two other schools, was a part of a $370 million Houston ISD school construction project, which originated from a school bond approved in March 1989. Rose Garza, the principal of Benavidez, said that the committee determining the name of the school named it after Roy P. Benavidez, a soldier in the Vietnam War who was given the Medal of Honor, because the school wanted to name the school after a Hispanic who could serve as a positive role model to the mostly Hispanic student body that occupied the school when it opened. HISD officials said that the district had little difficulty opening the three schools in the middle of the year, since the same teachers had been teaching the same students while they occupied the previously overcrowded schools in the preceding fall. On its opening day Benavidez referred 400 students to other schools due to overcrowding. After Benavidez opened, Benavidez and Cunningham each had about 700 students. In 1994, Benavidez had 1,065 pupils and it had to send 200 children to different schools. As of that year, 88% of Benavidez's children were Hispanic. By 1996, both Cunningham and Benavidez became overcrowded.
- Joyce Benbrook Elementary School (Houston)
  - Serves parts of Oak Forest
- James Berry Elementary School (Houston)
- Edward L. Blackshear Elementary School (Houston)
  - This school serves sections of the Third Ward, including parts of Washington Terrace
- James Butler Bonham Elementary School (Houston)
  - Serves portions of Sharpstown
  - From circa 2009 to 2019, there were seven persons who held the post as principal.
- Melinda Bonner Elementary School (Houston)
- Braeburn Elementary School (Houston)
  - This school serves portions of Gulfton, Shenandoah, and Maplewood
  - Due to the effect of Hurricane Harvey on the Braeburn campus in 2017, it was to be rebuilt.
- Briargrove Elementary School (Houston)
  - This school serves Briargrove and Tanglewood as well as a small section of Hunters Creek Village
  - The current 93,500-square-foot (8,690 m^{2}) Briargrove Elementary School, with a capacity for about 850 students and designed by FKP Architects and built by Heering International Inc., had a cost of about $16 million. The campus divides multiple classes into "pods". The driveway and 60 parking spaces are to the rear of the campus.
- Andrew Briscoe Elementary School (Houston)
  - This school serves portions of Magnolia Park
- Brookline Elementary School (Houston)
  - Brookline's campus was designed to hold 285 students. In 1992 it had 1,175 students, and therefore it had 35 temporary classrooms.
- Robert Browning Elementary School (Houston) - Named after Robert Browning
  - Serves parts of Norhill
- Blanche Kelso Bruce Elementary School (Houston) - Named after Blanche Kelso Bruce
  - Serves portions of the Fifth Ward and Downtown Houston
  - As of 2019 due to the proximity of Interstate 45, the school experienced noise pollution and twice the amount of asthma compared to the HISD average. About 99% of the students were black or Hispanic.
- Luther Burbank Elementary School (Houston)
- David G. Burnet Elementary School (Houston)
  - Serves portions of the East End, including a part of the Second Ward
- James D. Burrus Elementary School (Houston)
  - Serves Independence Heights
- Barbara Pierce Bush Elementary School (Houston) (Opened midterm 1992)
  - Serves Parkway Villages, Lakes of Parkway, and Briarhills
  - Bush opened in 1992 and relieved Ashford Elementary. Its capacity is 750 students. In the 2004-2005 school year it had over 1,000 students.
- Rufus Cage Elementary School (Houston)
  - Serves portions of Eastwood
- Edna Carrillo Elementary School (Houston)
  - Serves a section of Eastwood in the East End
- John E. Codwell Elementary School (Houston)
- Condit Elementary School (Bellaire)
  - Serves portions of Bellaire outside of the 610 Loop
- Ethel R. Coop Elementary School (Houston)
- Felix Cook Elementary School (Houston, opened in 2006)
- J. P. Cornelius Elementary School (Houston)
- Manuel Crespo Elementary School (Houston)
  - Crespo opened in 1992 and relieved Sanchez Elementary and Park Place Elementary.
  - The rate of the school's students passing all TAAS tests declined from 85% to 65%, by two categories of state accountability ratings, between 1998 and 1999; in the latter year 293 students took the test, while in the previous year over half of the population was exempted from taking it, with only 145 taking the tests.
- David "Davy" Crockett Elementary School (Houston)
  - Serves the First Ward, the Sixth Ward and parts of Downtown Houston It formerly served a small section of the Houston Heights.
- Leroy T. Cunningham Elementary School (Houston)
  - This school serves portions of Gulfton and Shenandoah
  - It first opened in 1953. Originally its capacity was 300 students. By 1992 the school had 1,150 students, and this meant it had to have 51 temporary classrooms to accommodate the extra students. Benavidez opened to relieve Cunningham.
- Ray K. Daily Elementary School (also known as Westside Relief, Houston, opened Fall 2007)
  - The 7-acre (2.8 ha) school property is adjacent to the Memorial Ashford Little League facility. The campus had a cost of $14 million and the designer was RWS Architects. Its capacity is 750 students, and it opened to relieve Bush Elementary.
  - It was named after Ray Karchmer Daily, an ophthalmologist who joined the HISD board in 1928. She promoted equal pay for HISD employees who were female and black, special education, industrial arts education, and reading programs. She lost her re-election campaign in 1952 because she advocated for free lunches for students; her opponents believed the promotion of free lunches was a Communist campaign.
- Jaime Dávila Elementary School (Houston)
- James DeAnda Elementary School (opening in the 2010s)
- Helen C. DeChaumes Elementary School (Houston)
- Lorenzo DeZavala Elementary School (Houston)
  - This school serves portions of Magnolia Park
- Matthew W. Dogan Elementary School (Houston)
  - Serves portions of the Fifth Ward
  - By Spring 2011 Dogan and Scott were scheduled to be consolidated, with a new campus in the Scott site.
- Mylie E. Durham Elementary School (Houston)
  - Dedicated in 1968, it was named after the founder of the Durham Clinic.
- Durkee Elementary School (Houston)
  - The school is on Nordling Road, near Rittenhouse Road. It opened in the fall of 1954 with 16 classrooms, and an additional 8 classrooms were installed in 1958. From 1978-1980 13 regular classrooms, two Kindergarten classrooms, four special education classrooms, a media center, and a resource center were established as part of another addition.
  - The school, first opened in 1912, was named after John Edward Durkee, a man from New York State who purchased an area he named "Little York" (after New York State) and sold land to the Harris County School District #25. The first Durkee school, a four-room, red-brick building, was developed on that land, which is now the site of Fonville Middle School. The initial class at Durkee was mainly made up of Italian American immigrants. The school had three teachers by 1918, and Durkee became a part of HISD around 1920. From 1931 to 1947 the school was closed; it reopened due to an increasing student body. In fall 1954 the current campus opened; the original Durkee building was initially closed but reopened to house some primary school classes in the middle of the 1954-1955 school year. After the new building received an addition in 1958, the original Durkee was demolished and Fonville Middle was built in its place.
- Charles W. Eliot Elementary School (Houston)
  - This school serves portions of Denver Harbor
- Horace Elrod Elementary School (Houston)
  - This school portions of Fondren Southwest and Maplewood South
- Bennie Carl Elmore Elementary School (Houston)
  - The school serves Settegast
  - The school building, which opened in 2000, formerly housed Elmore Middle School. The current 40 classroom, 130,000 square feet (12,000 m^{2}) facility, which had a multimillion-dollar cost, replaced the original Elmore Middle School. The Elmore campus joined HISD and was converted into an elementary school during the merger of North Forest ISD into HISD on July 1, 2013.
  - Circa 2019, almost half of the teachers in each school year are not present in the following school year.
- Ralph Waldo Emerson Elementary School (Houston)
  - This school serves a section of Sharpstown and a small section of Piney Point Village
- Eugene Field Elementary School (Houston)
  - Serves parts of the Houston Heights and Norhill
  - Eugene Field Elementary School was once known as the "Studewood School". The architect, Harry D. Payne, gave it a style similar to that of Mediterranean European architecture, with a salmon stucco exterior with a buff terra cotta trim with a multicolored purple/brown/buff roof. In 2001, at Field, 42% of the students had limited English proficiency, and 94% of the students received free or reduced lunch. That year the school district labeled 52% of its students as being "at risk". In 2015 Field Elementary applied to have a magnet program for theater and media arts.
- Cecile Foerster Elementary School (Houston)
- Walter W. Fondren Elementary School (Houston)
- Marcellus E. Foster Elementary School (Houston)
- Benjamin Franklin Elementary School (Houston)
  - This school serves portions of Magnolia Park
- Robert Lee Frost Elementary School (Houston)
  - 2003 National Blue Ribbon School
- Mario Gallegos Elementary School (Houston)
  - This school serves portions of Magnolia Park
- Marcario Garcia Elementary School (Houston) - The school, which opened in October 1992, was named after military veteran Marcario Garcia.
- Garden Villas Elementary School (Houston)
  - Serves Garden Villas
- Golfcrest Elementary School (Houston)
- Lucille Gregg Elementary School (Houston)
- Virgil I. Grissom Elementary School (Houston)
  - As of 2010, about 300 of the 800 students (37%) are classified as homeless. Most of the homeless students at Grissom live in households belonging to other families, which may be of friends or relatives of the homeless, in an arrangement called "doubling up."
- Jenard M. Gross Elementary School (Houston, opened 2001 in the former campus of I. Weiner Jewish Secondary School)
  - Serves a section of Missouri City
- John Richardson Harris Elementary School (Houston) (originally named Harrisburg School)
- Roland P. Harris Elementary School (Houston)
  - R. P. Harris's campus was designed to hold 195 students. In 1992 it had 916 students, and as a result had 32 temporary classrooms.
- Victor Hugo Hartsfield Elementary School (Houston)
  - 2008 National Blue Ribbon School
- Harvard Elementary School (Houston)
  - 2008 National Blue Ribbon School
- Helms Community Learning Center (Houston)
  - Serves parts of the Houston Heights In 2024, HISD removed Helms's attendance boundary.
- James P. Henderson Elementary School (Houston)
  - This school serves Idylwood
- Nat Q. Henderson Elementary School (Houston)
  - Serves portions of the Fifth Ward
- Gary L. Herod Elementary School (Houston)
  - This school serves a small western part of Meyerland, a portion of Maplewood, and Maplewood North
- John Herrera Elementary School (Houston)
- Highland Heights Elementary School (Houston)
  - Serves portions of Acres Homes
  - In 2023 it had 469 students. The school failed state accountability ratings in the period 2013-2019 and 2022. In 2023 the assistant superintendent of transformation, Khalilah Campbell-Rhone, stated that the school was improving.
- Asa Grant Hilliard Elementary School (Houston)
  - The original Hilliard Elementary building was built in 1963 and the current building was built in 2000. It became a part of HISD as part of the merger with NFISD on July 1, 2013.
  - Due to the effect of Hurricane Harvey on the Hilliard campus in 2017, it will be renovated. Circa 2019, each year 37% of the teachers in each school year do not appear in the following school year; this teacher retention rate is among the lowest in HISD.
- William P. Hobby Elementary School (Houston)
  - This school serves Brentwood in the Hiram Clarke area
- Paul W. Horn Academy (Bellaire)
  - Serves portions of Bellaire inside of the 610 Loop
- Rollin Lee Isaacs Elementary School (Houston)
  - In 1998 Leon Pettis Jr., the principal of Isaacs, said that most students at Isaacs had limited English proficiency. Isaacs had received the Texas Education Agency rating of "exemplary." For that year 34% of their students were not tested for the Texas Assessment of Knowledge and Skills (TAKS). 4% were tested, but their scores did not factor into the TEA rating.
- Peter Janowski Elementary School (Houston)
- Jean Hines-Caldwell Elementary School (initially named Corinthian Pointe Relief Elementary School before its fall 2005 opening) (Houston)
  - Serves Corinthian Pointe
- Thomas Jefferson Elementary School (Houston)
- Kashmere Gardens Elementary School (Houston)
  - 2003 National Blue Ribbon School
- Anna Kelso Elementary School (Houston)
  - Serves portions of South Park
- John F. Kennedy Elementary School (Houston)
  - A new campus was scheduled to be built on the Allen Elementary School site; when it opens in spring 2011 it was scheduled to take students from Allen and Kennedy elementary schools
- James L. Ketelsen Elementary School (Houston)
- Jennie Katharine Kolter Elementary School (Houston)
  - Serves portions of Meyerland south of the Brays Bayou
  - Due to the effect of Hurricane Harvey on the Kolter campus in 2017, it will be rebuilt.
- Dora B. Lantrip Elementary School (Houston) (formerly Eastwood Elementary School)
- James H. Law Elementary School (Houston)
- Judd Mortimer Lewis Elementary School (Houston) (formerly Grades PreK-3)
  - Serves portions of Glenbrook Valley
  - Bellfort Academy was scheduled to be consolidated into Lewis Elementary so that all grades attend the same campus; the consolidated school was expected to open in Spring 2011.
- Lucian L. Lockhart Elementary School (Houston)
  - Serves Riverside Terrace, sections of Washington Terrace, and other parts of the Third Ward area
  - By Spring 2011 Lockhart and Turner were to be consolidated, with a new campus in the Lockhart site. The HISD board had approved the consolidation on November 12, 2008. The current Lockhart building, constructed as part of the 2007 Bond, has 85,960 square feet (7,986 m^{2}) of space. The current Lockhart building was dedicated on August 22, 2013.
- Henry Wadsworth Longfellow Elementary School
  - This school, in Braes Manor Section 1 of Braeswood Place, serves Knollwood Village, portions of Braeswood Place, Linkwood, Woodside, and Woodshire
- Adele Looscan Elementary School (Houston)
- William G. Love Elementary School (Houston)
  - This school serves sections of the Houston Heights and Cottage Grove
  - In 2016 residents in the Love Elementary attendance area proposed adding a magnet program to Love Elementary so it could attract a wider variety of students and additional financial support from the community. As of that year it had fewer than 500 students; 88% of its students were Hispanic or Latino, 7% were white, and 89% were considered low income. Its demographics and level of financial support strongly contrast with other Heights area elementary schools.
- Edgar O. Lovett Elementary School (Houston)
  - Serves portions of Meyerland north of the Brays Bayou, sections of Bellaire outside of the 610 Loop, and a portion of Maplewood
- E. A. "Squatty" Lyons Elementary School (Houston) (Opened January 1993)
- Henry MacGregor Elementary School (Houston) (formerly Southmore Elementary School)
  - This school serves sections of the Museum District, Neartown, and Midtown Sections of Neartown served by MacGregor include Courtlandt Place, First Montrose Commons, Roseland Estates, and Westmoreland, as well as and small sections of Avondale and Audubon Place.
- Reagan W. Mading Elementary School (Houston)
- Thurgood Marshall Elementary School - It originally opened as an elementary school in 1956. Its current building opened in 2000. Originally the building erected in 2000 was used as Keahey Intermediate School. Prior to closing the building was used as the Thurgood Marshall Early Childhood Center. The school was converted into an elementary school on July 1, 2013, when the school became a part of HISD due to the NFISD merger. HISD repurposed the building to serve as the area elementary school for the northwest portion of the NFISD school zone.
- Clemente Martinez Elementary School (Houston)
- Raul C. Martinez Elementary School (Houston)
  - This school serves portions of Denver Harbor
- Ernest McGowen Sr. Elementary School (Houston) (formerly Houston Gardens Elementary School)
  - This school serves Houston Gardens
- Ila McNamara Elementary School (Houston)
- Memorial Elementary School (Houston)
  - This school serves Rice Military and Crestwood/Glen Cove as well as portions of Cottage Grove
- Alan Alexander Milne Elementary School (Houston)
  - Named after A.A. Milne, a British author who created Winnie the Pooh. It is in Brays Oaks, and opened in 1991.
- J. C. Mitchell Elementary School (Houston)
  - Due to the effect of Hurricane Harvey on the Mitchell campus in 2017, it will be rebuilt.
- James Montgomery Elementary School (Houston, opened Fall 1960)
  - 2003 National Blue Ribbon School
- Joe E. Moreno Elementary School (Houston, opened Fall 2005)
- Pat Neff Elementary School (Houston)
  - Serves portions of Sharpstown
- Northline Elementary School (Houston)
  - In 2017 67% of the students had English as a second language and 92 percent were considered to be low income.
- Oak Forest Elementary School (Houston)
  - Serves portions of Oak Forest
- James Oates Elementary School (Houston)
- John G. Osborne Elementary School (Houston)
  - Serves portions of Acres Homes
- Roderick Paige Elementary School (Houston) (formerly Woodland Elementary School and James Bowie Elementary School)
- Park Place Elementary School (Houston)
  - Serves Park Place
  - Park Place Elementary has signage in English, Spanish, and Vietnamese. As of 2006, 20% of the students attending the school are ethnic Vietnamese.
  - Park Place opened in 1915, as a part of the City of Park Place. The land was donated by the Park Place Development Company. The city government renovated the school in 1925, and HISD annexed the school in 1927. The original campus was built to house 255 children. In 1992 it had 944 students. Park Place was relieved by Crespo Elementary School, which opened later that year.
- Cynthia Ann Parker Elementary School (Houston)
  - Serves portions of Westbury and Maplewood South
- Robert C. Patterson Elementary School (Houston)
- Lora B. Peck Elementary School (Houston)
  - Was consolidated with MacArthur Elementary. A replacement campus on the Peck site was expected to open in Spring 2011. Circa 2011 the student body was 98% black, and in 2013 the student body, enlarged from the merger, was 52% Hispanic and Latino.
  - For a fourteen-year period Carlotta Outley Brown served as Peck's principal. R. A. Schuetz and Jacob Carpenter stated "Peck routinely met state academic standards during her tenure, occasionally earning distinctions awarded to schools performing above average compared with campuses with similar student demographics." Outley Brown insisted that parents dress in appropriate clothing when coming to school, a practice she would continue as principal of Madison High School.
  - In 2015 Target Corporation gave the school $100,000, through Outley Brown, on the Ellen Degeneres Show.
  - In 2018 the Texas accountability rating of the school was 80 while the HISD average was 84.
  - 2008 National Blue Ribbon School
- Henry Petersen Elementary School (Houston)
- Piney Point Elementary School (Houston)
- Pleasantville Elementary School (Houston)
  - This school serves Pleasantville and Clinton Park
- Edgar Allan Poe Elementary School (Houston)
- Port Houston Elementary School (Houston)
  - This school serves Port Houston
- Leeona L. Pugh Elementary School (Houston)
  - This school serves portions of Denver Harbor
- Samuel Clark Red Elementary School (Houston)
  - The school, in Willowbend Section 4, serves Willow Meadows and Willowbend
- James R. Reynolds Elementary School (Houston)
- River Oaks Elementary School, in Houston, is a school which draws students from the entire Houston Independent School District. River Oaks Elementary celebrated its 75th anniversary in the 2003-2004 school year.
- Oran M. Roberts Elementary School (Houston)
  - Roberts serves Southgate, Old Braeswood, and Morningside Place
  - Roberts has a magnet program in the fine arts. As of 2002 the school consistently achieves high test scores.
- Judson W. Robinson Elementary School (Houston) (Opened 2002)
  - Due to the effect of Hurricane Harvey on the Robinson campus in 2017, it was renovated. Pleasantville Elementary School and Holland Middle School took students on a temporary basis during the renovations.
- Sylvan Rodriguez Elementary School (Houston)
  - This school serves portions of Gulfton
- Theodore Roosevelt Elementary School (Houston)
- Betsy Ross Elementary School (Houston)
- Pearl S. Rucker Elementary School (Houston)
- George I. Sanchez Elementary School (Houston)
  - Its campus was designed to hold 690 students. In 1992 Sanchez had 1,382 students. That year Crespo opened to relieve Sanchez.
- Walter W. Scarborough Elementary School (Houston)
  - 2003 National Blue Ribbon School
  - 2007 National Blue Ribbon School
  - Due to the effect of Hurricane Harvey on the Scarborough campus in 2017, it will be rebuilt.
- Mary Scroggins Elementary School (Houston)
  - This school serves portions of Denver Harbor
- Juan N. Seguin Elementary School (Houston, Opened 2002)
  - The 86,000-square-foot (8,000 m^{2}) facility was built for about $11.5 million from HISD Rebuild 2002 bond funds. Construction took place from early 2001 until 2002. It took overflow students from Brookline and Cornelius elementary schools. The school uses a pod system where multiple classrooms connect to each "pod".
- Sidney Sherman Elementary School (Houston)
  - Serves portions of Fifth Ward
  - By Spring 2011 Crawford and Sherman was to be consolidated, with a new campus in the Sherman site.
- Shadydale Elementary School (Houston)
  - The school was built in 2000. It became a part of HISD as a part of the NFISD merger on July 1, 2013.
- Charles P. Shearn Elementary School (Houston)
  - Serves the subdivision of Westwood
- Thomas Albert Sinclair Elementary School (Houston)
  - Serves parts of the Houston Heights
- Katherine "Kate" Smith Elementary School (Houston)
  - Serves parts of Oak Forest
- Joanna Kent Southmayd Elementary School (Houston)
- St. George Place Elementary School (Houston, opened Fall 2007)
  - St. George Place Elementary School, an 86,000-square-foot (8,000 m^{2}) facility, has a capacity of 750 students. It serves areas east and west of the 610 Loop; the bulk of its boundary is south of Westheimer Road, north of Westpark Drive, east of Fountainview, and west of Weslayan; there is also a section bounded by Westheimer, the 610 Loop, the Buffalo Bayou, and a set of railroad tracks. Besides St. George Place itself, the school also serves Afton Oaks, Larchmont, and the Weslayan area. The building has various color-coded "pods" in which classes are concentrated; the color scheme was used to assist young children. It has science rooms, a multi-purpose room with a stage, fine arts rooms, and a combined media center and library. Molina Walker Architects Inc. designed the facility while Heery International Inc. constructed it for a cost of $14 million.
  - St. George Place Elementary opened in 2006. Most of the funds used to develop the school came from the HISD bond while some came from the TIRZ. St. George Place was the successor of the charter school School at Post Oak, which was held at a YMCA and formed to relieve overcrowded area schools; about 180 students were to transfer from School at Post Oak to St.George Place.
- Lulu Stevens Elementary School (Houston)
  - Serves parts of Oak Forest
- William S. Sutton Elementary School (Houston)
  - This school serves portions of Sharpstown and Maplewood
- Ruby L. Thompson Elementary School (Houston) (formerly Southland Elementary School, opened 1915, renamed in 1980 )
  - It is named after longtime HISD teacher Ruby Thompson. Thompson, originally known as Southland Elementary School, first opened in 1915 near what is now Yvette Calloway Park. It moved to a site on Dixie Street in 1949, and in 1976, to a different portion of the same area, along Tampa Street. It received its current name in 1980. Its current building was dedicated on October 19, 2007. The 86,000-square-foot (8,000 m^{2}), 750 student building is Leadership in Energy and Environmental Design (LEED) certified. This building is about twice the size as the previous one.
  - Thompson serves the Star of Hope Family Shelter, a homeless shelter. Margaret Downing of the Houston Press said that as of 2010 it probably had the highest percentage of homeless children of all HISD schools.
- Felix Tijerina Elementary School (Houston)
  - This school serves portions of Magnolia Park
- Eleanor Tinsley Elementary School (Houston)
  - From circa 2009 to 2019, there were seven persons who served as principal.
- William B. Travis Elementary School (Houston)
  - Serves Woodland Heights
- Mark Twain Elementary School (Houston)
  - Twain is located in Braeswood Place and serves most of that community as well as portions of Southside Place.
  - The original campus of Twain was a red brick building. Originally Twain's magnet program was focused on after-school programs. In the 1980s parents in the area considered Twain to be an undesirable school. In 1986 a group of parents at Bethany United Methodist Weekday School decided to organize the group Friends of Mark Twain to call for an improvement in Twain and lobbied on its behalf. The school's reputation improved and, according to former principal Joyce Dauber, by 1996 75% of the parents of students lived in the school's neighborhood. By 2004 the original Twain building was razed. Students at Twain were put in temporary buildings while a new school building, financed by the 2002 Rebuild Houston school bond program, was under construction. Its cost was $14 million and it was scheduled to open in 2005. Melissa Patin became principal of Twain in 2011.
- Valley West Elementary School (Houston)
- Jonathan Wainwright Elementary School (Houston)
  - Serves parts of Oak Forest
- Walnut Bend Elementary School (Houston, opened 1964)
  - Serves Walnut Bend and Briargrove Park
  - The school first opened in 1964 with a capacity of 350 students. Its current two-story $14 million campus was designed by VLK Architects and constructed by Heery International.
- Mabel B. Wesley Elementary School (Houston)
  - Serves portions of Acres Homes
  - In summer 1991 the principal, Thaddeus Lott, received media attention, and that fall the school grew by 250 students as area parents, including some from other school districts, wished to enroll their children in Wesley.
- West University Elementary School (West University Place)
  - West University Elementary serves West University Place, Sunset Terrace/Montclair, a portion of Southside Place, and a portion of Upper Kirby
  - The school opened in 1925, although its permanent facility was not yet complete at the time; Platte School initially took its non-kindergarten students while the sales office of Southside Place housed kindergarten students. The permanent facility has a Spanish Renaissance architectural style and was financed by a $55,000 bond. The majority of the land that housed the school was donated by D. T. Austin and W. D. Haden. The permanent building opened sometime before 1928; originally Pershing Middle School was connected to WUES; Pershing later obtained its own campus in Houston in 1948. In the 1970s and 1980s West University parents reshaped a school which Tim Fleck of the Houston Press described as "deteriorating" into "a community focal point that kept many West U children in public school through the fifth grade." West University Elementary School as, by the 1990s, became what Fleck described as "the prototype of how the increasingly minority district could maintain the allegiance of affluent whites" and "a selling point for parents moving into the area." The Rice School opened in August 1994 to relieve West University Elementary School and several nearby campuses. As a result, the attendance boundary was shifted, and the school began serving all of Sunset Terrace/Montclair; previously a portion of that community was zoned to West University, with the other portion zoned to Will Rogers. In 1996 37% of West University Elementary students had transferred there from other schools. In 2015 West U Elementary had 1,274 students, making it HISD's largest elementary school, with 96% of the students living inside the attendance zone.
- Tina E. Whidby Elementary School (Houston)
- Edward White Elementary School (Houston)
  - Serves portions of Sharpstown
- Mark White Elementary School (Houston)
  - The school will serve as a reliever campus for Briargrove, Emerson, and Piney Point elementary schools and the Pilgrim K-8's elementary division. It will not have its own attendance boundary. It is named after Governor of Texas Mark White. It is scheduled to open in August 2016.
- John Greenleaf Whittier Elementary School (Jacinto City)
- Windsor Village Elementary School (Houston) (Formerly a grocery store)
- Carter G. Woodson Elementary School (Houston)
  - Formerly was a PK-8 campus; it changed to PK-5 in 2018.
  - Circa 2019, over 40% of the teachers in a particular school year were not present in the following one.
- Ethel Young Elementary School (Houston) (Formerly Sunny Side Elementary School)
  - Serves Sunnyside

Several schools formerly elementary-only became PK-8 or K-8:

- Garden Oaks Montessori School
- Wharton Dual Language Academy
- Wilson Montessori School (now Baker Montessori School)

This school, formerly, became K-8 and then in 2019 became exclusively a middle school:

- Thomas Jefferson Rusk Middle School

== Other elementary schools ==
- Arabic Immersion Magnet School (Houston)
- Energized For Excellence Academy (Houston)
- Mandarin Chinese Language Immersion Magnet School (Houston)
- North District Alternative Elementary School (Houston)
- Pleasant Hill Academy (Houston)
- Pro-Vision School (Houston)
- Shadowbriar Elementary School (Houston) (Magnet K-5) (Opened 1997)
  - Originally a 6th grade school
  - Previously served grades 3-5
- Soar Center (Houston)
- St. John's Academy (Houston) - Serves preschool to second grade children in certain scenarios, such as homelessness and health crises.
- TSU/HISD Lab School (Houston, In fall 2006 the school became an HISD-sponsored charter school)
- Young Learners (Houston)
- Young Scholars Academy For Excellence (Houston)

== Former schools ==
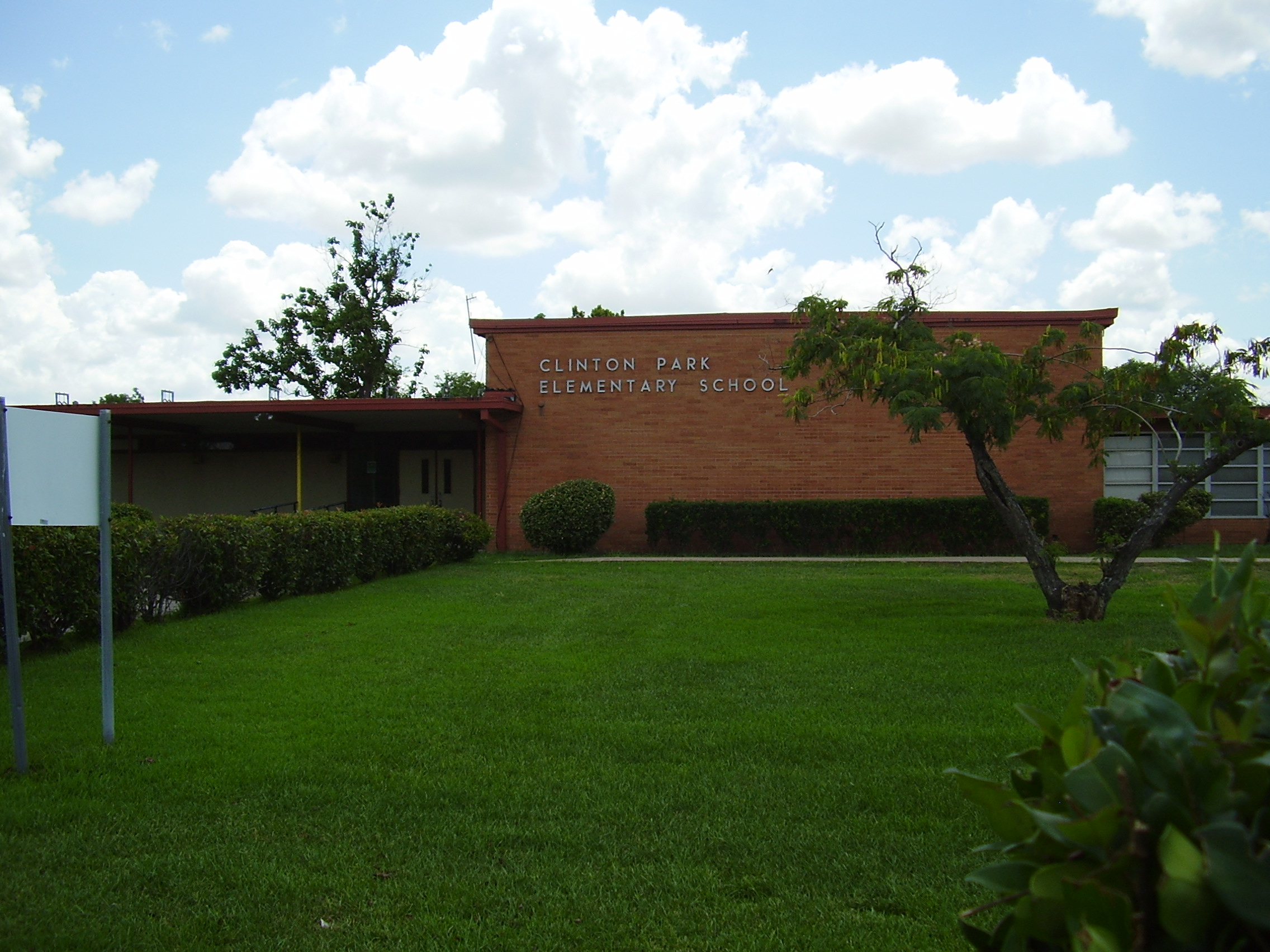
Clinton Park Elementary School in Clinton Park closed in 2005

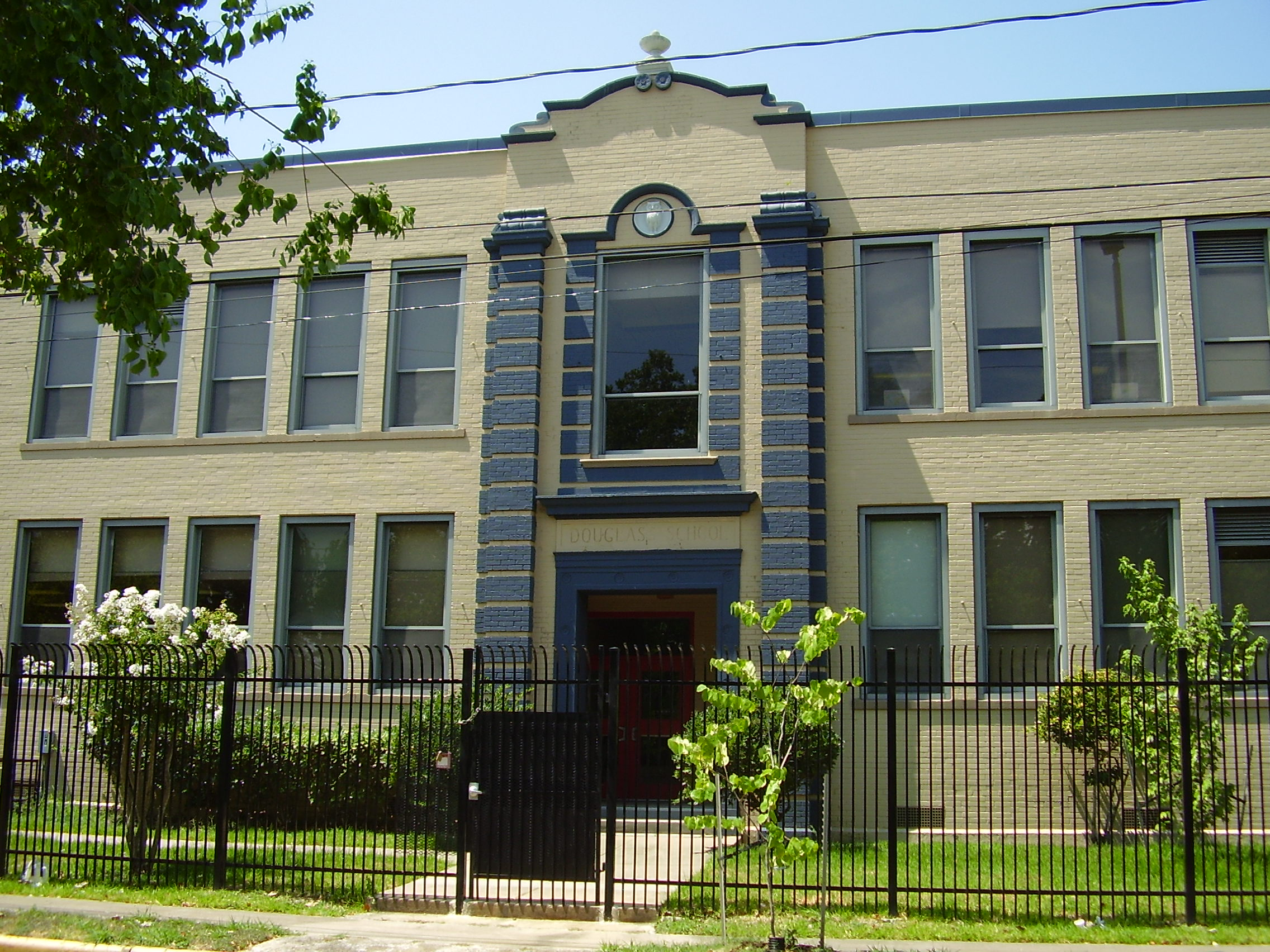
Douglass Elementary School (now Yellowstone Academy) in the Third Ward

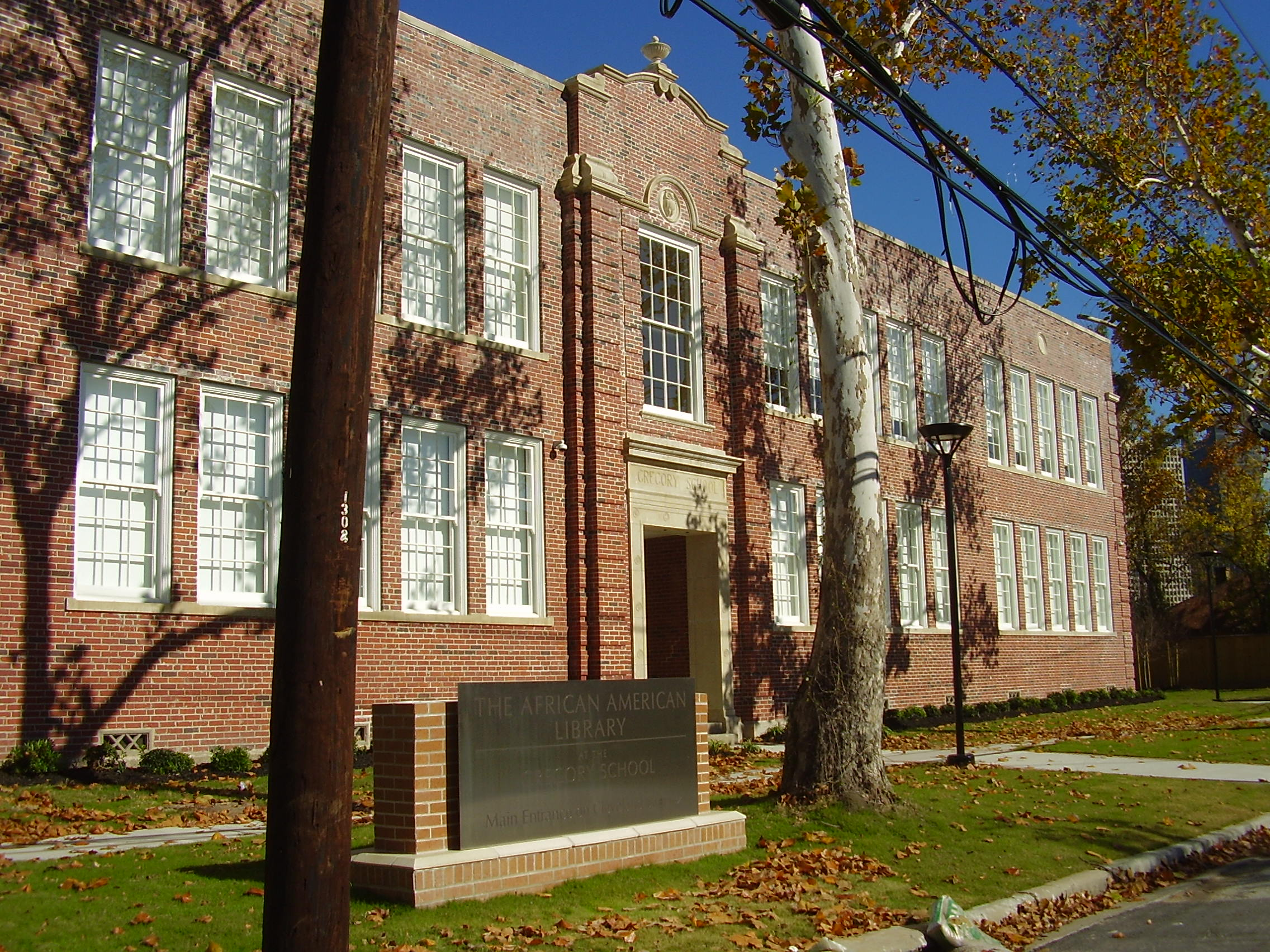
The former Gregory School in the Fourth Ward, now the African American Library at the Gregory School

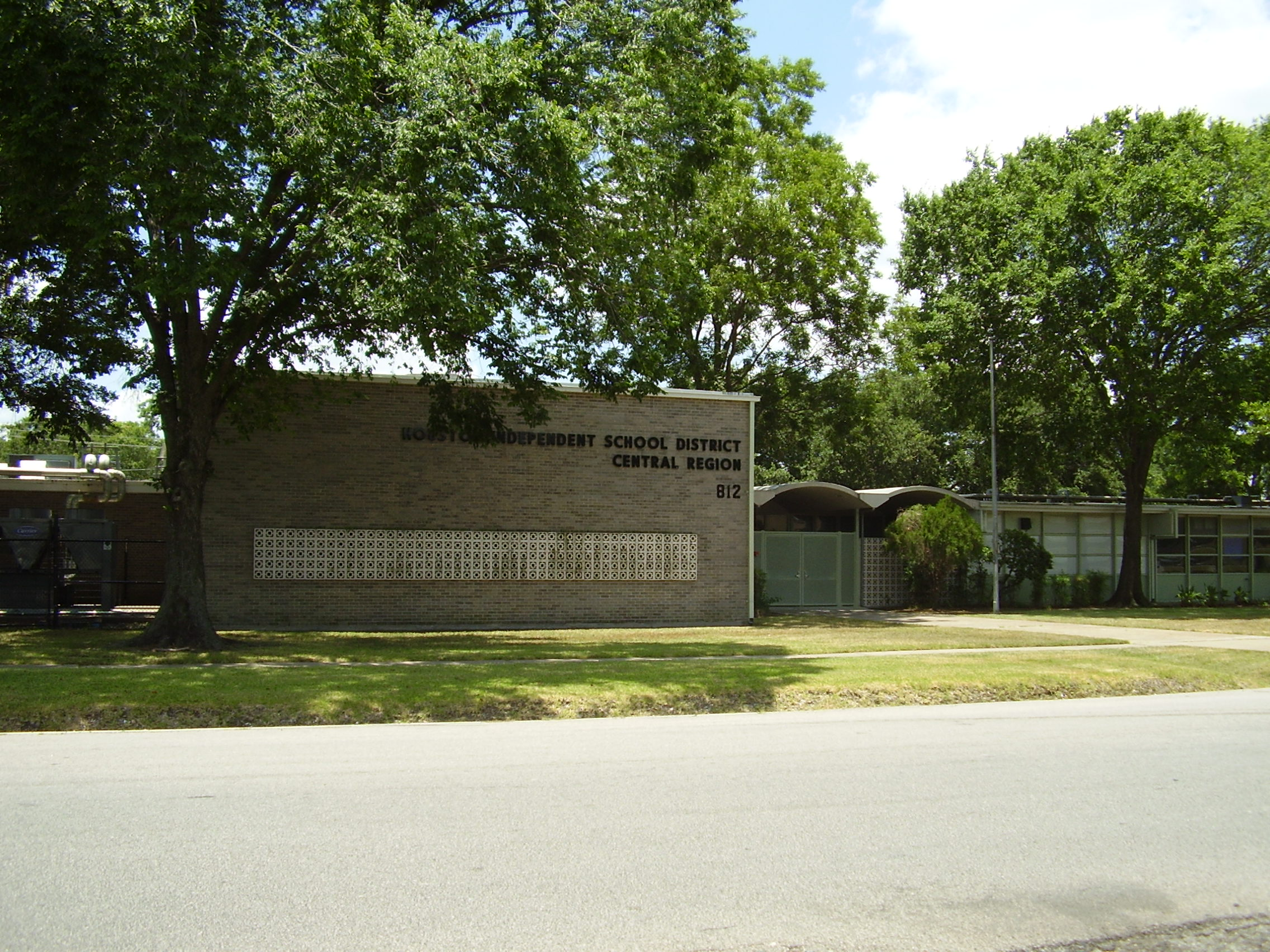
Houston ISD Central Region Office in the Houston Heights, formerly Holden Elementary School

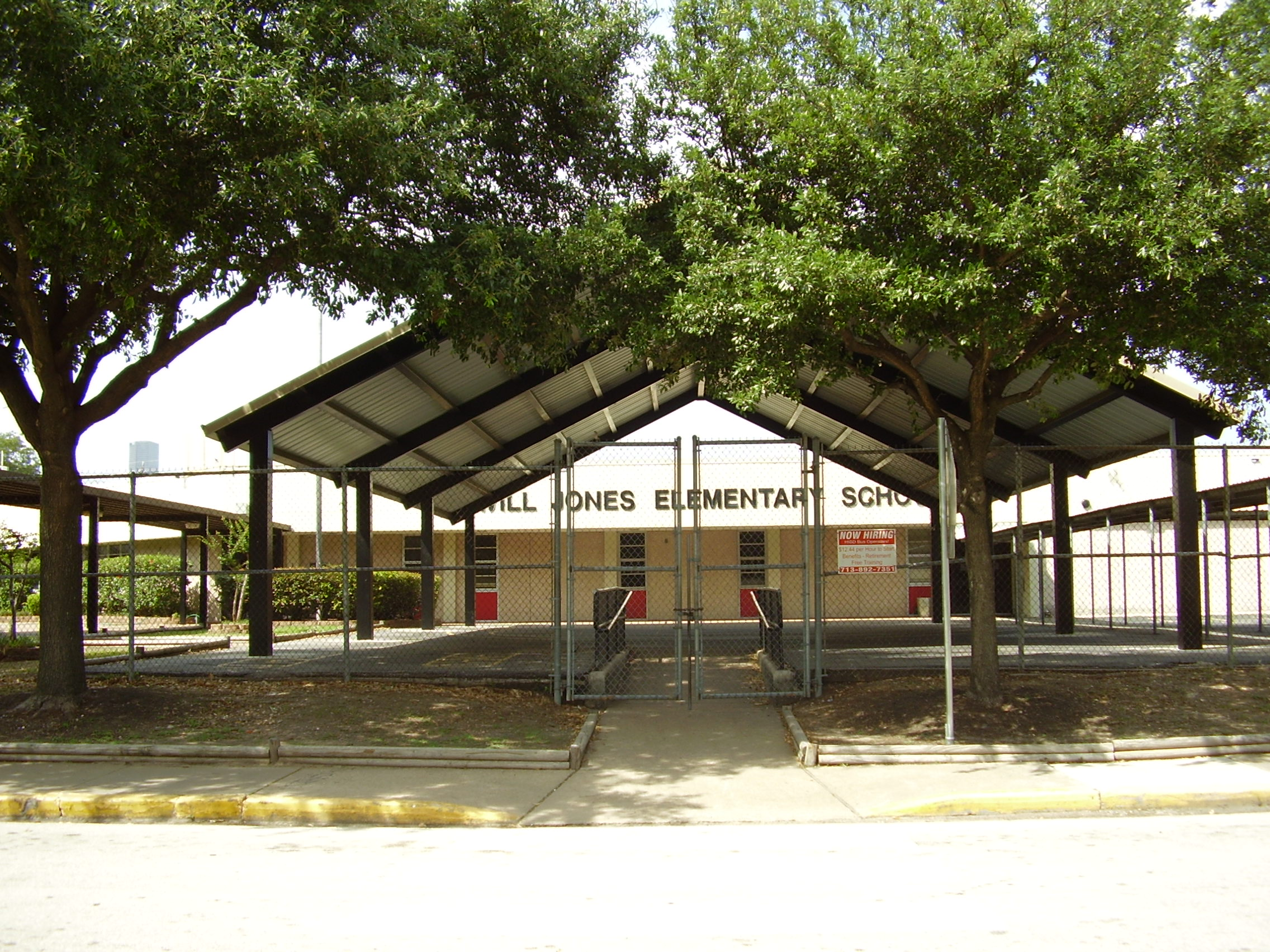
J. Will Jones Elementary School in Midtown

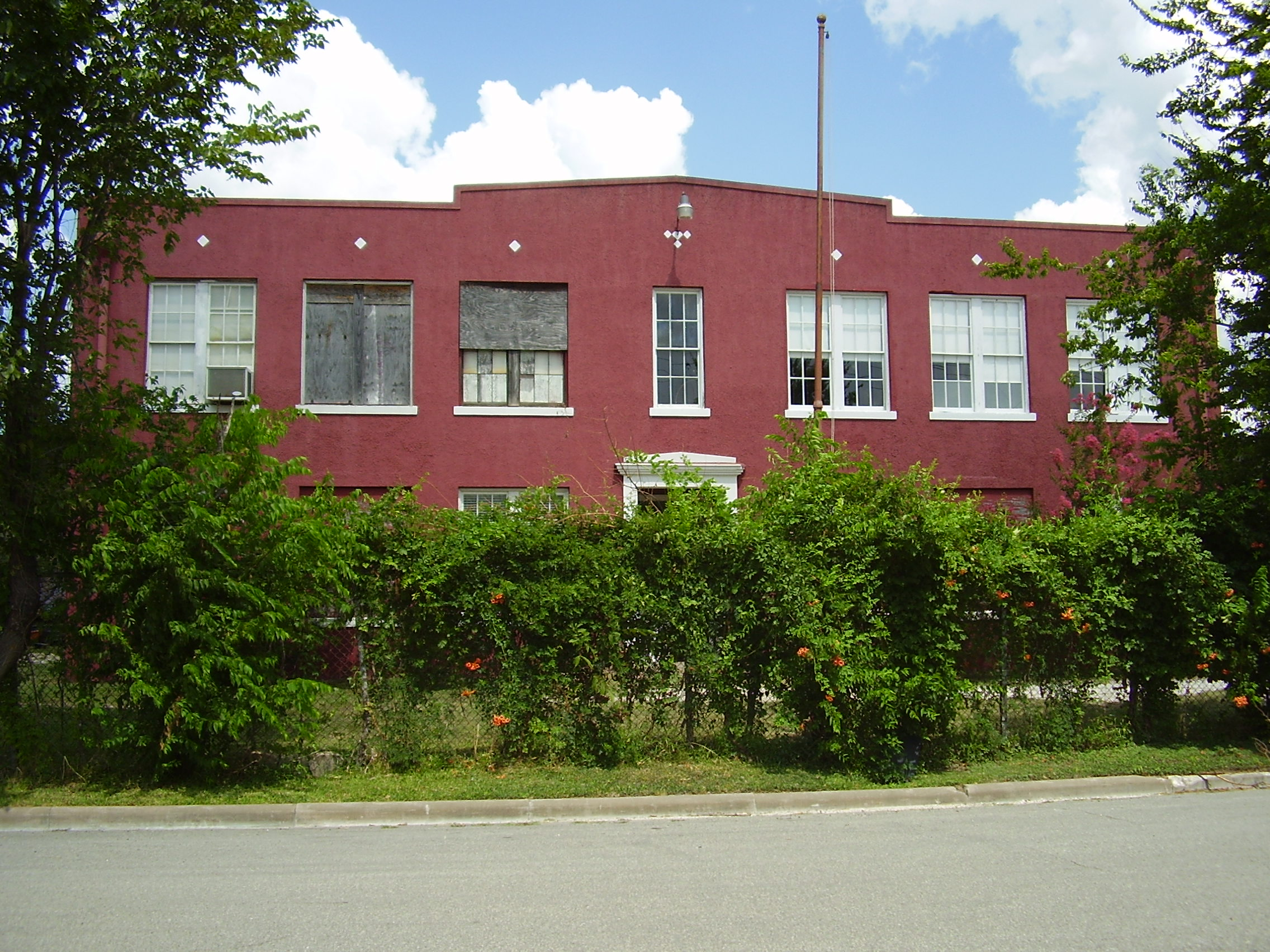
Luckie School in East Downtown

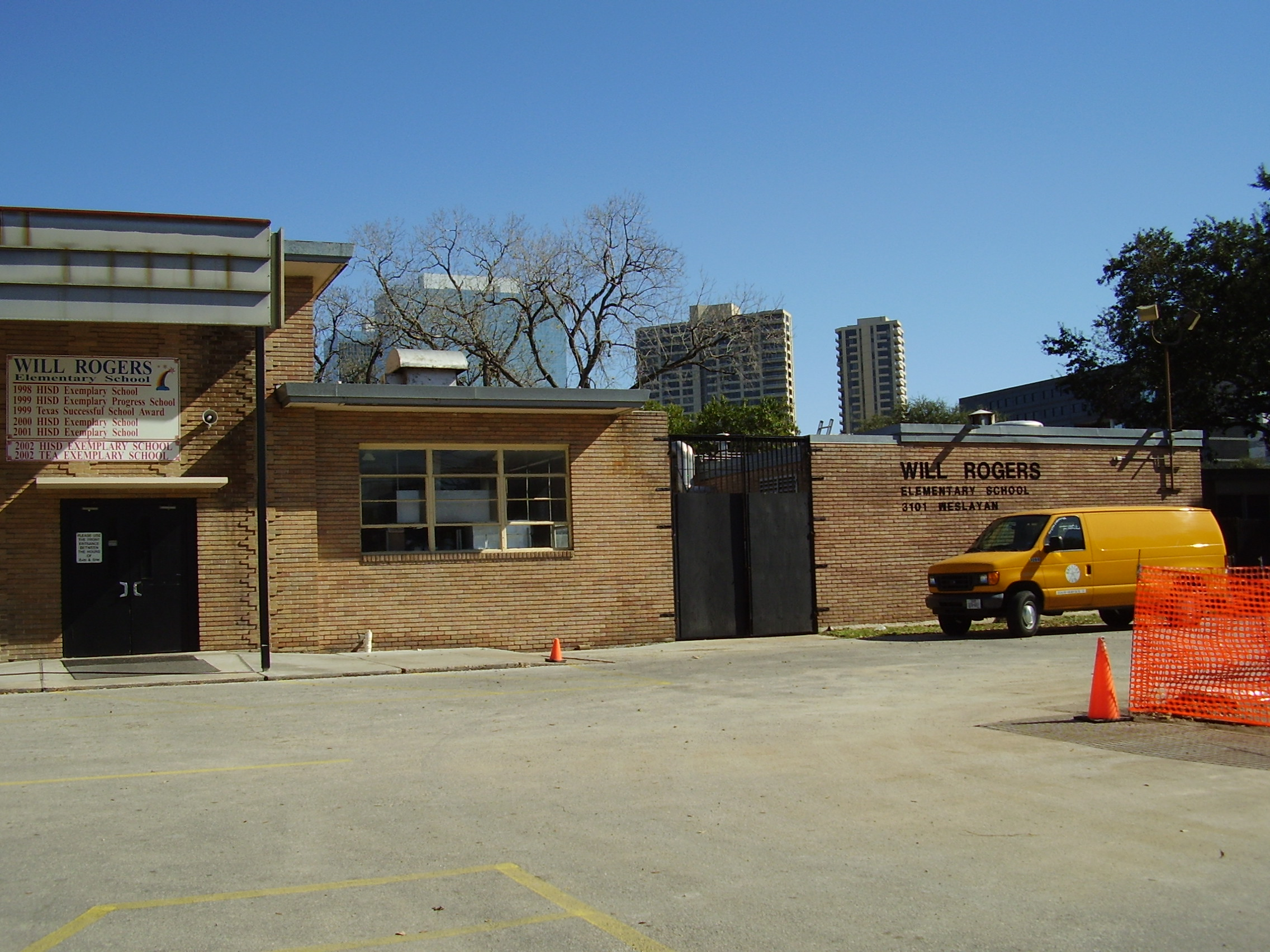
Will Rogers Elementary School (closed and demolished)

Former zoned schools

- 23rd Avenue Elementary School (Destroyed by a fire in 1959, reopened as Holden in 1960)
- Abbott Elementary School (3601 Barnes, opened in 1912 as part of the Chaneyville Independent School District, transferred to the City of Houston in 1914, closed in 1959)
- Alamo Elementary School (201 East 27th, opened 1913 as Sunset Heights Elementary School, closed 1980)
- Charlotte B. Allen Elementary School (Houston)
  - Allen closed in 2009. A new campus will be built on the Allen site; when it opens in spring 2011 it will take students from Allen and Kennedy elementary schools
- Alyce PreK-1 Center(Houston)
- Argyle Elementary School (12525 Fondren Road, Houston, 77035) (Closed spring 2005, Argyle was located in a strip mall - Students rezoned to Foerster ES)
- Bellfort Academy (Houston) (4-5, opened 1999)
  - Was consolidated into Lewis Elementary so that all grades attend the same campus; the consolidated school was expected to open in Spring 2011. Bellfort became a PreK-K center.
- Richard J. Brock Elementary School (1417 Houston Avenue, Houston, 77007) (Closed spring 2005, Students rezoned to Crockett ES) - Campus became an early childhood center
  - Formerly served the Sixth Ward and a section of Downtown Houston
- Brays Bayou Elementary School (Almeda near Main, became a part of HISD in 1913 and closed in 1966)
- Burgess Elementary School (4040 Blackshear, opened in September 1962, closed in 1969 and consolidated into the Washington High School campus) - Burgess was named for the first mayor of Independence Heights
- Carnegie Elementary School (10401 Scott, Houston, 77051) (Closed spring 2002, Students rezoned to Woodson K-8 Center) - Campus became a high school (named after Andrew Carnegie)
  - The school was in southern Houston. Most of its students were low income and lived in housing obtained with government subsidies. The school had about 456 students, with 91% black, 6% Asian, and 2% Hispanic, in the period 1994-1999. The area served by the school was built in the 1960s. It was scheduled to receive a Spark Park in 1998 since many of the students had no play areas in their apartment complexes.
- Robert C. Chatham Elementary School (8110 Bertwood, Houston, 77016) (closed in spring 2006, Students rezoned to Cook ES)
- W. D. Cleveland Elementary School (320 Jackson Hill, closed 1977)
- Clinton Park Elementary School (129 Mississippi, Houston, 77029 - Clinton Park) (closed in spring 2005, Students rezoned to Pleasantville ES)
  - Prior to spring 2005, Clinton Park was served by Clinton Park Elementary School at 129 Mississippi Road. After spring 2005, Clinton Park Elementary School closed because it had a too small enrollment; its final enrollment was 148 students. The students were moved to Pleasantville Elementary School. Josephine Espree, a teacher at Clinton Park, said that the school closing was like a "death in the family" for the community. Edwin Davis, president of the Clinton Park Civic Club, criticized the closing of the school.
- Concord Elementary School (Later became Concord Early Childhood Center)
- Cooley Elementary School (300 West 17th, Closed 1980 - The building, now the Cooley Center, is the headquarters of HISD's alternative certification program.)
- Joseph H. Crawford Elementary School (Houston)
  - It formerly served sections of the Fifth Ward, Downtown Houston, and the Near Northside
  - By Spring 2011 Crawford and Sherman were scheduled to be consolidated, with a new campus in the Sherman site.
- Julius Dodson Elementary School (Houston) (opened in 1921 as Bowie Elementary School)
  - Located in East Downtown, served that area and the Third Ward
  - In 2014 the Dodson school had about 445 students. That year, the HISD school board was to vote on whether to close Dodson Elementary. Terry Grier, the HISD superintendent, argued that Dodson needs to close so another school will be located there while its permanent facility is under construction. On Thursday March 13, 2014, the HISD board voted to close Dodson Elementary 5-4. The Montessori program was to move to Blackshear Elementary. As part of rezoning for the 2014-2015 school year, all areas in the Third Ward previously under the Dodson zone were moved to the Blackshear zone.
- Frederick Douglass Elementary School (3000 Trulley Street, Houston, 77004) (Closed spring 2005, Students rezoned to Dodson ES - The campus later became New Orleans West, a charter school for Hurricane Katrina evacuees from New Orleans (named after Frederick Douglass))
- Dow Elementary School (1900 Kane, closed around 1991-1993)
- Dunbar Elementary School (2202 St. Emanuel, Closed 1981) - Established on the campus of former Longfellow Junior High School in 1961
  - It formerly served sections of the Third Ward
- Rosa Lee Easter Elementary School (4435 Weaver, closed in summer 2006, Students rezoned to Cook ES)
- Eighth Avenue Elementary School (727 Waverly Street, Houston, 77077) (Closed spring 2004, Students rezoned to Love ES)
  - An elementary school for black children, which became Eighth Avenue Elementary, opened in 1911 and received its current name and final campus in 1913. The campus on Heights block 267, in 2003 served the southwest portion of the Houston Heights. It became a district-run charter school, a status sought by principal Teresa Lenoir, because the State of Texas did not grant the school permission to have early Friday dismissal to allow for teacher training, while the school had the right to unilaterally do so with charter status. Eighth Avenue closed after the HISD board voted to close it in 2004. Students were rezoned to Love Elementary.
- Thorton M. Fairchild Elementary School (8701 Delilah, Houston, 77033) (Opened fall 1959, closed May 24, 2007)
- Fannin Elementary School (2900 Louisiana, Houston, closed 1971)
- Maud W. Gordon Elementary School (Bellaire) (Unzoned relief school)
- Buchanan H. Grimes Elementary School (Houston) - The previous building was where Grimes Park is now, while the final building, opposite of the park, opened in 1959. From 1989 to 2000 the principal was Kathleen Morgan. Circa 1991 it had 529 students, but this declined to 380 in 2011. It closed in 2011.
- Hawthorne Elementary School (1417 Houston Avenue, Opened 1893 at former Houston Avenue School location, Closed 1959)
- Henry L. Hohl Elementary School (Houston)
  - Hohl closed by 2011; students were rezoned to Highland Heights Elementary School and other schools.
- Holden Elementary School (812 West 28th Street, Houston, 77008) (Closed spring 2004, students rezoned to Helms ES and Sinclair ES)
  - Served a section of the Houston Heights
  - In 1999 49% of the students passed all TAAS tests, and in 2000 75% of the students tested passed all TAAS tests.
- Anson Jones Elementary School (2311 Canal Street, Houston, 77003-1518) (Closed spring 2006, students rezoned to Bruce ES and Rusk ES)
  - Located in the Second Ward, it served the Second Ward, other parts of the East End, and a section of Downtown Houston
  - Anson Jones opened in 1892 as the Elysian Street School; its first campus was destroyed in a fire, and that was replaced in 1893 with a three-story building at 914 Elysian in what is now Downtown. It was named after Anson Jones in 1902. In the 1950s many students resided in Clayton Homes, a Houston Housing Authority public housing complex, and the students were majority Hispanic and Latino. In 1962 it had 609 students. Anson Jones moved to a new campus in the Second Ward in 1966, and its original campus in Downtown was demolished. In 1967, A. Jones moved to a new location on Canal Street. In several decades leading up to 2006, the school lost population. Charles Ross, the school's final principal, who had served in that capacity for 14 years, said that the school lost about 200 students during his term. As of the 2005-2006 school year, it had a little over 200 students. The student population was mostly Hispanic and African American. Two thirds of the students lived in Clayton Homes. The A. Jones school closed in 2006. HISD sold the building. The areas formerly zoned to the school were rezoned to the Bruce and Rusk schools. The cafeteria of the former school became a reception hall. Offices of the Urban Harvest organization are now located in Suite 200 of the former school.
- J. Will Jones Elementary School (Houston)
  - Served portions of Midtown and the Third Ward
  - J. Will Jones Elementary School, located in Midtown, received an unacceptable academic rating from the Texas Education Agency. Under principal Brian Flores, the school's test scores increased in a five-year period until 2009. Around 2009 the school provided bus services to several homeless shelters within the school's attendance zone. As of 2009, over 1/3rd of Jones's students were homeless. About 100 of the around 300 students were homeless, and about 30 came from a Salvation Army shelter. Flores said that this was the highest number of homeless students during his career as a principal at Jones. In 2008 99% of the students were on free or reduced lunch. Every year the school held its "Gift of Giving" ceremony.
  - Before the start of the 2009-2010 school year Jones was consolidated into Blackshear Elementary School, a campus in the Third Ward. During its final year of enrollment J. Will Jones had more students than Blackshear. Many J. Will Jones parents referred to Blackshear as "that prison school" and said that they will not send their children to Blackshear. Jones was scheduled to house Houston Community College classes after its closure as a school. Supporters of keeping J. Will Jones created a campaign to try to keep J. Will Jones open. The Jones campus became the campus of Houston Academy for International Studies. Blackshear and Gregory-Lincoln elementary took portions of J. Will Jones's former territory in Midtown.
- Kay Elementary School (Opened in 1904 at 7621 Elm as Harrisburg School, renamed and moved to 1616 Hebert in 1952, Closed 1978)
- Lamar Elementary School (2209 Gentry Street, Houston, 77009-8196) (Closed spring 2002, School replaced by Ketelsen ES (named after Mirabeau B. Lamar))
  - Formerly served a section of the Near North Side
- Langston Elementary School (Opened in 1905 as Breckenridge Elementary School, renamed in 1955, closed in fall 1991, later became Langston Early Childhood Center)
- Robert E. Lee Elementary School (2101 South Street, Houston, 77009) (Closed spring 2002, School replaced by Ketelsen ES (named after Robert E. Lee))
  - Served a section of the Near North Side
- Lubbock Elementary School (412 Sampson, Closed 1969)
- Charles W. Luckie Elementary School (1104 Palmer, Closed c. 1943, a school for African-Americans)
- General Douglas B. MacArthur Elementary School (Houston)
  - Was consolidated with Peck Elementary. A replacement campus on the Peck site was scheduled to open in Spring 2011.
- Jesse C. McDade Elementary School (Houston) - Closed in 2011.
- McGowan Elementary School
- Milam Elementary School (1100 Roy Street, Houston, 77077) (named after Ben Milam)
  - It opened as Brunner High School, a part of the Brunner Independent School District, in 1912. Brunner ISD merged into Houston schools in 1913-1914 and it was converted into a grade 1-9 school, West End Junior High School. It was renamed to Ben Milam Elementary after junior high grades were moved to George Washington Junior High School in September 1926. In December 1977 the building closed as it had received significant damage; a replacement campus opened in August 1980. From 1977 to 1980 students attended school at Doris Miller. In April 2004 the HISD board voted to close Milam, rezoning its students to Memorial. As of 2007 Milam was being used as office space for the HISD administration. By 2011 Milam was converted into a private preschool.
- Miller Elementary School (5216 Feagan, closed 1977)
- Montrose Elementary School (opened 1913, closed prior to 1981)
- Pleasants Elementary School (opened 1967, closed June 1991, now home to Pleasant Hill Academy)
- School At Post Oak (Houston) (Post Oak had no boundary; it was a reliever school for Briargrove)
- Joseph James Rhoads Elementary School (Houston) - Closed in 2011.
- Will Rogers Elementary School (3101 Weslayan Street, Houston, 77027) (opened fall 1950, closed spring 2006, Students rezoned to Poe ES, St. George Place ES, and Memorial ES (the school was named after Will Rogers))
  - Formerly served Afton Oaks and the Greenway condominiums.
  - HISD sold the land housing the HISD administrative headquarters, which included Will Rogers, prompting the closure. In its final year, 85% of the students lived outside of the Will Rogers attendance zone, and HISD used this as a contributing factor in its decision to close the school.
- J. D. Ryan Elementary School (4001 Hardy Street, Houston, 77009) (closed spring 2005, Students rezoned to Jefferson ES and Looscan ES)
  - In northern Houston, Ryan was previously a mostly African-American school. Circa 1970-1972 the student body included about 258 Mexican-Americans.
  - After closure it was used as a temporary school for Hurricane Katrina evacuees.
  - Ryan is now the Ryan Professional Support & Development Center
- Sanderson Elementary School (7115 Lockwood Drive, Houston, 77016) (closed spring 2006 - formed Cook ES)
  - Sanderson was a 2003 National Blue Ribbon School.
- Sands Point Elementary School (Houston) (Unzoned relief school, opened in 1998 - Located within the Institute of Chinese Culture, and later the Chinese Consulate, closed in 2009)
- Emmett J. Scott Elementary School (Houston)
  - In 1998 Article Hedgemon, the principal, said that most of the school's students had limited English proficiency. In 1998 Scott received an exemplary rating from the TEA. 44% of its students did not take the TAAS. Another 4% took the test, but had their scores exempted.
  - By Spring 2011 Dogan and Scott were scheduled to be consolidated, with a new campus in the Scott site.
- Sharpview Elementary School (7734 Mary Bates Boulevard, Houston, 77036) (opened fall 2000, closed spring 2004) - The district rented space from a Buddhist Temple
- Robert Louis Stevenson Elementary School (Houston)
  - It was named after Robert Louis Stevenson The school opened in 1915 as Cottage Grove High School. In 1927 the school was remodeled and given its final name. According to Lisa Sacaris, the educational liaison of the Cottage Grove Civic Association, the school had a capacity of around 450 students. Around 2007, the school district considered closing Stevenson. Sacaris added that the school was just beginning to attract families with young children before the school district announced a plan to close the school. The community was creating a plan to recruit additional families to the school. In May 2011 the school had 357 students. At that time the school district proposed closing the school and rezoning children to Memorial and Love Elementary Schools in order to cut costs. Sacaris, who stated her opposition to the closure, argued that the plan would not reduce costs because the district would have to spend more money to send school buses to send children to more distant schools. Sacaris also said that InTown Homes's plans to build 230 houses in the Stevenson attendance zone and the school's "Leader In Me Academy" are reasons to keep the school open. Jane West, the president of the superneighborhood that includes Cottage Grove, said that the school district would need the school's capacity within several years. West also stated that after the district closed nearby Ben Milam Elementary School, it was converted into a private preschool. The school district closed Stevenson in 2011. The post-closure preliminary Texas Education Agency 2011 rating was "Exemplary." The school district promoted the already-closed school as one of the 59 HISD schools that received exemplary ratings. The TEA ratings of Memorial and Love decreased from 2010 to 2011. Sacaris said that the news was "bittersweet."
- Sugar Grove Elementary School (Houston) (Unzoned relief school)
  - Established in 1994, it was named after a church that previously was located where the Sugar Grove campus was built. It was converted into a zoned middle school, Sugar Grove Academy, in 2008.
- George Turner Elementary School (Houston)
  - Turner closed in 2009, consolidated into Lockhart. By Spring 2011 a new campus was to be built in the Lockhart site. The HISD board had approved the consolidation on November 12, 2008 despite the opposition of Sheila Jackson Lee and Sammye Prince Hughes, the head of the Turner parent-teacher organization and the president of the Southwood Civic Club. In 2009 Turner, which occupied a building from the 1920s, had 259 students.

Other former schools:

- 3-D Academy (Became a state charter in 2005 and as of 2008 is associated with KIPP)
- Banneker-McNair Math/Science Academy (Houston)
- Diversity Roots And Wings Academy (Draw) (3920 Stoney Brook Drive, 77063) (Houston, Opened 2001, became a state charter in 2004)
- Dominion Academy (Houston) - Closed 2012
- Kazi Shule (Houston) - Kazi Shule was an alternative school for pupils with behavioral problems. It opened as a middle school but became an elementary school in 2001 for the 2001-2002 school year. Closed May 2006.
- YMCA Of Greater Houston Charter School (ended affiliation with HISD in 2004, Houston)
- Mount Hebron Academy (Houston) - Mount Hebron was an alternative school for pupils with behavioral problems. - Closed Summer 2006
