= Mike Adams (columnist) =

American writer (1964–2020)

- Born: October 30, 1964; Columbus, Mississippi, U.S.
- Died: July 23, 2020 (aged 55); Wilmington, North Carolina, U.S.
- Education: San Jacinto College (AA); Mississippi State University (BA, MS, PhD)
- Occupations: Conservative columnist, professor of criminology

Michael Scott Adams (October 30, 1964 – July 23, 2020) was an American conservative political columnist, writer and professor of criminology at the University of North Carolina Wilmington. He became known for his outspoken opinions, frequently attracting controversy. When he did not receive a promotion to full professor, he filed a lawsuit against the university and eventually won. After many conflicts with students and national coverage of his controversial social media and blog posts, public pressure to have him removed grew and he was eventually asked to retire. Twenty-one days after reaching a retirement settlement with the university, he was found dead in his home with a gunshot wound to the head.

== Early life and education ==
Adams was born on October 30, 1964, in Columbus, Mississippi, to Joe Dee Adams, Jr. and Julia Marilyn Rester Adams, and raised in Clear Lake City, Texas. He graduated from Clear Lake High School in 1983, and earned an associate degree in psychology from San Jacinto College in Pasadena, Texas. He then transferred to Mississippi State University, where he was a member of Sigma Chi, to finish his Bachelor of Arts in 1987. He remained at Mississippi State to obtain a Master of Science in psychology under the mentorship of David McMillen in 1989, followed by his doctorate in sociology in 1993.

== Career ==
In 1993, the University of North Carolina Wilmington (UNCW) hired Adams to teach in the criminal justice program, where he continued to teach until July 2020. He won the Faculty Member of the Year award in 1998 and again in 2000, and his classes were popular with many students.

After the September 11 attacks, a UNCW student sent a mass message to faculty critical of United States foreign policy in the Middle East. Adams responded with another mass message criticizing the student and her arguments. The student subsequently submitted a request for access to Adams' other private emails. The university inspected Adams' emails and did not take any action. The story attracted attention among free-speech organizations and conservative media, leading to him becoming "a gleefully self-avowed 'anti-diversity' celebrity" according to Slate.

Adams became known for his outspoken conservative opinions, which were frequently controversial with students, faculty, and the public. Harbor House published Adams' first book, Welcome to the Ivory Tower of Babel, in 2004. Sentinel published his second book, Feminists Say the Darndest Things: A Politically Incorrect Professor Confronts "Womyn" on Campus, in 2007. Later that year, Adams joined the faculty of Summit Ministries in Manitou Springs, Colorado, where he spent his summers lecturing against abortion and defending First Amendment rights on college campuses.

His third book, Letters to a Young Progressive: How to Avoid Wasting Your Life Protesting Things You Don't Understand was published by Regnery Publishing in 2013.

=== Employment discrimination lawsuits ===
In 2007, Adams was denied a promotion by the UNCW administration and sued university officials, alleging religious and speech-based discrimination. Adams specifically alleged that the university had discriminated against him on the basis of his Christian views and writings. Adams was represented by David French and attorneys Alliance Defending Freedom, a conservative Christian legal advocacy organization.

The U.S. District Court for the Eastern District of North Carolina initially granted summary judgment in favor of university officials. Adams appealed to the U.S. Court of Appeals for the Fourth Circuit, where he was supported by the American Association of University Professors, the Thomas Jefferson Center for the Protection of Free Expression, and the Foundation for Individual Rights in Education, which filed an amicus brief in his support. In 2011, the Fourth Circuit reversed "the district court's grant of summary judgment as to Adams' First Amendment claims of viewpoint discrimination and retaliation" and sent the case back to the district court. The Fourth Circuit, however, upheld the district court's grant on summary judgment to the defendants on Adams' Title VII and Equal Protection Clause claims, finding that there was "simply no direct evidence that the Defendants treated Adams differently based on his religious beliefs."

In 2014, on remand in the district court, Adams won at a jury trial, bringing a seven-year legal battle to a close. UNCW filed an appeal with the Fourth Circuit, but that appeal did not proceed because the parties settled the case. Under the terms of the settlement, Adams was promoted to full professor and received seven years' back pay.

=== Removal from teaching ===
In 2016, he was widely criticized by his colleagues for mocking a UNCW student by name in a publication. The UNCW Academic Senate President said, "We wouldn't have imagined that we would have to tell our colleagues that they shouldn't make public statements about students in the media, on social media or anyplace for that matter." According to The Daily Beast, his "social media accounts and blog posts are littered with hate speech against gay, lesbian, transgender, and queer people" and he regularly used his platform on Daily Wire "to attack and mock... students, staff, and faculty".

On May 29, 2020, Adams posted, "Massa Cooper, let my people go!" on Twitter and later tweeted "Don't shutdown the universities. Shut down the non-essential majors. Like Women's studies." The University of North Carolina Wilmington responded with "These comments may be protected, but that is not an excuse for how vile they are. We stand firmly against these and all other expressions of hatred."

Public pressure to have him removed from teaching rose from a Facebook group named Justice for UNCW, which gained 8,000 followers. Two Change.org petitions called for his removal. Actor Orlando Jones joined the calls to fire Adams. Hundreds of criminology professors and graduate students from across the U.S. delivered a petition which, in part, stated, "Professor Adams hides behind the veil of 'free speech,' but through his rhetoric on Twitter and his column he has harassed, threatened, and spread hateful speech against students and faculty." Through an agreement with the university, Mike Adams was scheduled to retire on August 1, 2020, and was to receive a settlement of $504,702.76 which was to be paid out over the course of 5 years to cover lost salary and retirement benefits.

== Personal life ==
Adams was a member of several professional organizations, including the Academy of Criminal Justice Sciences, the Alabama-Mississippi Sociological Association, the American Society of Criminology, the National Association of Scholars, the Mid-South Sociological Association, the Southeastern Psychological Society and the Southern Sociological Society, He had also been a Christian convert from atheism since 2000, switching his party affiliation from Democratic to Republican as a result. He was married in 2003 to Krysten Dyanne Scott, a then student of UNCW, but they later divorced.

== Death ==
On July 23, 2020, Adams was found dead at his home in Wilmington, North Carolina, by police conducting a welfare check. Release of the 911 tape from the event indicated Adams died of a gunshot wound. On July 27 his death was ruled a suicide.

After his death, the UNCW chapter of the Young America's Foundation, for which Adams served as faculty adviser, issued a statement praising his legacy.

== Works ==
- Welcome to the Ivory Tower of Babel: Confessions of a Conservative College Professor, 2004.
- Feminists Say the Darndest Things: A Politically Incorrect Professor Confronts "Womyn" on Campus, 2007.
- Letters to a Young Progressive: How to Avoid Wasting Your Time Protesting Things You Don't Understand, 2013.
