= CVISD =

CVISD may refer to:

- Chama Valley Independent School District (New Mexico)
- Channelview Independent School District (Texas)
