= Breault =

Breault is a surname. Notable people with the surname include:

- Ann Breault (1938–2021), Canadian teacher, nurse, journalist and politician
- Frank Breault (born 1967), Canadian ice hockey player
- Henri Breault (1909–1983), Canadian doctor and medical researcher
- Henry Breault (1900–1941), United States Navy submarine sailor
- Kevin D. Breault, American sociologist
- Michael Breault (born 1958), American game designer, editor, and author
- Nicole Breault, American sailor
- Robert Breault (born 1963), American operatic tenor
