= Channelview, Texas =

- Census-designated place
- Location of Channelview in Harris County and Texas
- Coordinates: 29°46′34″N 95°6′55″W
- Country: United States
- State: Texas
- County: Harris

Area
  - Total: 18.1 sq mi (47.0 km^{2})
  - Land: 14.8 sq mi (38.3 km^{2})
  - Water: 3.4 sq mi (8.7 km^{2})
- Elevation: 30 ft (9 m)

Population (2020)
  - Total: 45,688
  - Estimate (2022): 43,204
  - Density: 3,090/sq mi (1,190/km^{2})
- Time zone: UTC−6 (Central (CST))
  - Summer (DST): UTC−5 (CDT)
- ZIP Code: 77530
- Area code: 281
- FIPS code: 48-14236

Channelview is a census-designated place (CDP) in the U.S. state of Texas on the east side of Houston in Harris County. Its population was 45,688 at the 2020 U.S. census.

== History ==
Channelview was given its name from its located on the northeastern curve of the Houston Ship Channel. The site of Channelview was home to Lorenzo de Zavala, one of the founding fathers of the Republic of Texas. During World War II, the area south of Market to the Ship Channel, and what is now DeZavala St. to the tollway, was part of the U.S. Army San Jacinto Ordnance Depot.

In 1990, an explosion occurred at the ARCO petrochemical plant in Channelview that killed 17 people and injured five others.

In 1991, Channelview was the site of a notable murder plot. Wanda Webb Holloway was convicted of attempting to hire a hitman to kill the mother of her daughter's junior high school cheerleading rival.

In 1992, Channelview was struck by Houston's only ever recorded F4 tornado just before Thanksgiving on November 21st,1992. The tornado grew to over a mile wide during its peak intensity.

In 1997, Coy Wayne Wesbrook committed mass murder in Channelview, killing five people.

== Geography ==
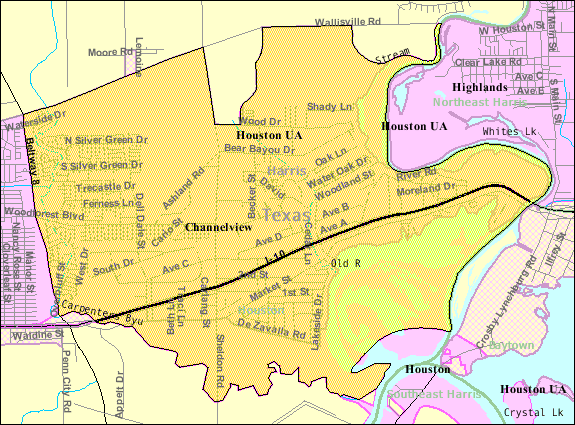
Map of the Channelview CDP

Channelview, located at the point where the San Jacinto River forms the Old River, is north of Interstate 10 and the Missouri Pacific Railroad and 15 miles (24 km) east of downtown Houston.

According to the United States Census Bureau, Channelview has a total area of 18.1 square miles (47.0 km^{2}), of which 3.4 square miles (8.7 km^{2}), or 18.46%, are covered by water.

== Demographics ==
Historical population
Census	Pop.	Note	%±
1980	17,471		—
1990	25,564		46.3%
2000	29,685		16.1%
2010	38,289		29.0%
2020	45,688		19.3%
U.S. Decennial Census; 1850–1900 1910; 1920 1930; 1950 1960 1970; 1980 1990 2000; 2010 2020

Channelview first appeared as a census designated place in the 1980 United States census.

=== Racial and ethnic composition ===
Channelview CDP, Texas – Racial and ethnic composition Note: the US Census treats Hispanic/Latino as an ethnic category. This table excludes Latinos from the racial categories and assigns them to a separate category. Hispanics/Latinos may be of any race.
Race / Ethnicity (NH = Non-Hispanic)	Pop 2000	Pop 2010	Pop 2020	% 2000	% 2010	% 2020
White alone (NH)	13,841	8,483	6,120	46.63%	22.16%	13.40%
Black or African American alone (NH)	3,798	5,671	5,543	12.79%	14.81%	12.13%
Native American or Alaska Native alone (NH)	86	95	58	0.29%	0.25%	0.13%
Asian alone (NH)	592	592	633	1.99%	1.55%	1.39%
Native Hawaiian or Pacific Islander alone (NH)	11	14	16	0.04%	0.04%	0.04%
Other race alone (NH)	35	51	153	0.12%	0.13%	0.33%
Mixed race or Multiracial (NH)	305	283	523	1.03%	0.74%	1.14%
Hispanic or Latino (any race)	11,017	23,100	32,642	37.11%	60.33%	71.45%
Total	29,685	38,289	45,688	100.00%	100.00%	100.00%

=== 2020 census ===
As of the 2020 census, 45,688 people, 13,451 households, and 9,752 families were residing in the CDP. The median age was 30.0 years. 31.4% of residents were under the age of 18 and 7.8% of residents were 65 years of age or older. For every 100 females there were 101.1 males, and for every 100 females age 18 and over there were 98.6 males age 18 and over.

100.0% of residents lived in urban areas, while 0.0% lived in rural areas.

There were 13,451 households in Channelview, of which 49.9% had children under the age of 18 living in them. Of all households, 52.2% were married-couple households, 17.7% were households with a male householder and no spouse or partner present, and 23.4% were households with a female householder and no spouse or partner present. About 16.0% of all households were made up of individuals and 5.1% had someone living alone who was 65 years of age or older.

There were 14,305 housing units, of which 6.0% were vacant. The homeowner vacancy rate was 1.2% and the rental vacancy rate was 7.0%.

Racial composition as of the 2020 census
Race	Number	Percent
White	13,174	28.8%
Black or African American	5,765	12.6%
American Indian and Alaska Native	814	1.8%
Asian	659	1.4%
Native Hawaiian and Other Pacific Islander	24	0.1%
Some other race	13,800	30.2%
Two or more races	11,452	25.1%
Hispanic or Latino (of any race)	32,642	71.4%

=== 2000 census ===
As of the census of 2000, 29,685 people, 9,189 households, and 7,369 families lived in the CDP. The population density was 1,831.2 inhabitants per square mile (707.0/km^{2}). The 9,874 housing units had an average density of 609.1/sq mi (235.2/km^{2}).

In 2000, the racial makeup of the CDP was 63.15% White, 13.03% African American, 0.55% Native American, 2.03% Asian, 18.35% from other races, and 2.89% from two or more races. Hispanic or Latino of any race were 37.11% of the population.

Of the 9,189 households in 2000, 48.6% had children under 18 living with them, 60.4% were married couples living together, 13.8% had a female householder with no husband present, and 19.8% were not families. About 15.7% of all households were made up of individuals, and 3.7% had someone living alone who was 65 or older. The average household size was 3.22, and the average family size was 3.60.

In the CDP, the age distribution was 33.7% under 18, 10.6% from 18 to 24, 32.2% from 25 to 44, 18.3% from 45 to 64, and 5.2% who were 65 or older. The median age was 29 years. For every 100 females, there were 100.6 males. For every 100 females 18 and over, there were 97.5 males.

The median income for a household in the CDP was $42,968, and for a family was $45,638 as of 2000. Males had a median income of $35,592 versus $26,423 for females. The per capita income for the CDP was $15,115. About 11.5% of families and 13.7% of the population were below the poverty line, including 17.3% of those under 18 and 15.4% of those 65 or over.

=== Income ===
By 2020, its median household income increased to $64,045.

== Education ==
Most Channelview CDP residents are served by the Channelview Independent School District, which is headquartered in the CDP. Some residents are served by the Galena Park Independent School District, which is also headquartered in the Channelview CDP.

Channelview ISD operates schools within the CDP. The district has one prekindergarten campus (Early Childhood Center), six elementary schools (Harvey Brown, Crenshaw, DeZavala, Hamblen, McMullan, and McGhee), two junior high schools (Alice Johnson Junior High School, and Anthony Aguirre Junior High School,), L.W. Kolarik 9th Grade Center, and Channelview High School. In addition, CISD operates the Endeavor High School of Choice, an alternative high school.

Sections of Channelview CDP in the Galena Park school district are zoned to schools outside of the Channelview CDP. The sections are divided between the attendance boundaries of Sam Houston Elementary School, and North Shore Elementary School, which are in the Cloverleaf CDP. All residents are zoned to Cobb Elementary School, North Shore Middle School in the Cloverleaf CDP, and North Shore Senior High School with two campuses in the Cloverleaf CDP.

Residents of both Channelview ISD and Galena Park ISD (and therefore all of Channelview CDP) are zoned to San Jacinto College.

Family Christian Academy and Foundation Christian School are located in Channelview.

== Parks and recreation ==
Harris County Precinct 2 operates the V.V. Ramsey Community Center, the M.L. Flukinger Community Center at 16003 Lorenzo Street, and the Old River Terrace Park on Market St.

== Infrastructure ==
The United States Postal Service operates the Channelview Post Office at 531 Sheldon Road.

The Harris Health System (formerly Harris County Hospital District) designated the Baytown Health Center in southeast Houston for the ZIP code 77530, and the Settegast Health Center for the ZIP code 77015. The designated public hospital is Lyndon B. Johnson General Hospital in northeast Houston.

== Notable people ==
NFL quarterback Jalen Hurts, the 2025 Super Bowl MVP, is a graduate of Channelview High School.

Channelview is also home to former Houston Astros pitcher Chris Sampson (2006–2010), former Chicago Bears wide receiver Johnny Knox (2009–2011), and former outfielder Glenn Wilson (1982–1993).
