= Channelview High School =

High school in Texas, United States

Location
- 1100 Sheldon Road; Channelview, Texas 77530; United States; 29.79578°N 95.11258°W

Information
- School type: Public high school
- Motto: Empowered to Thrive
- Locale: Suburban
- School district: Channelview Independent School District
- NCES District ID: 4813590
- Educational authority: Texas Education Agency
- Superintendent: Tory C. Hill
- CEEB code: 441217
- NCES School ID: 481359000851
- Principal: Emeterio Cruz
- Teaching staff: 167.14 (on an FTE basis)
- Grades: 9–12
- Enrollment: 2,917 (2024-2025)
  - Grade 9: 818
  - Grade 10: 752
  - Grade 11: 721
  - Grade 12: 626
- Student to teacher ratio: 17.45
- Colors: Blue and gold
- Athletics conference: UIL Class 6A
- Nickname: Falcons
- Website: Channelview High School

Channelview High School is a public high school serving students grades 9–12 in Channelview and other unincorporated communities in Harris County, Texas, United States of America. It is the main flagship school of the two high schools part of the Channelview Independent School District. The UIL region of the district is 6A. In 2022, the school received a "B" rating from the Texas Education Agency and received two distinction designations.

== Academics ==
The school educates over 2,800 students in grades 9–12 as of 2023. For the academic year 2015–16, 93.6% of students had been awarded their high school diplomas by the end of the year.

== Incidents ==
On March 13, 2018, a chartered school bus, carrying students from the school band, plunged down a ravine in Alabama after the driver had a heart attack. All 46 passengers suffered injuries.

== Athletics ==
The Channelview American football team plays in an 8,000-seat stadium. The stadium, municipally funded, was opened in 2012 at a cost of $27 million.

== Notable alumni ==
- Jalen Hurts, Super Bowl Champion American football player
- Johnny Knox, American football player
- Guy A. J. LaBoa, soldier
- De'Montre Tuggle, American football player
- Olen Underwood, American football player
- Glenn Wilson, Major League Baseball player
