= Johnny Knox =

American football player and coach (born 1986)

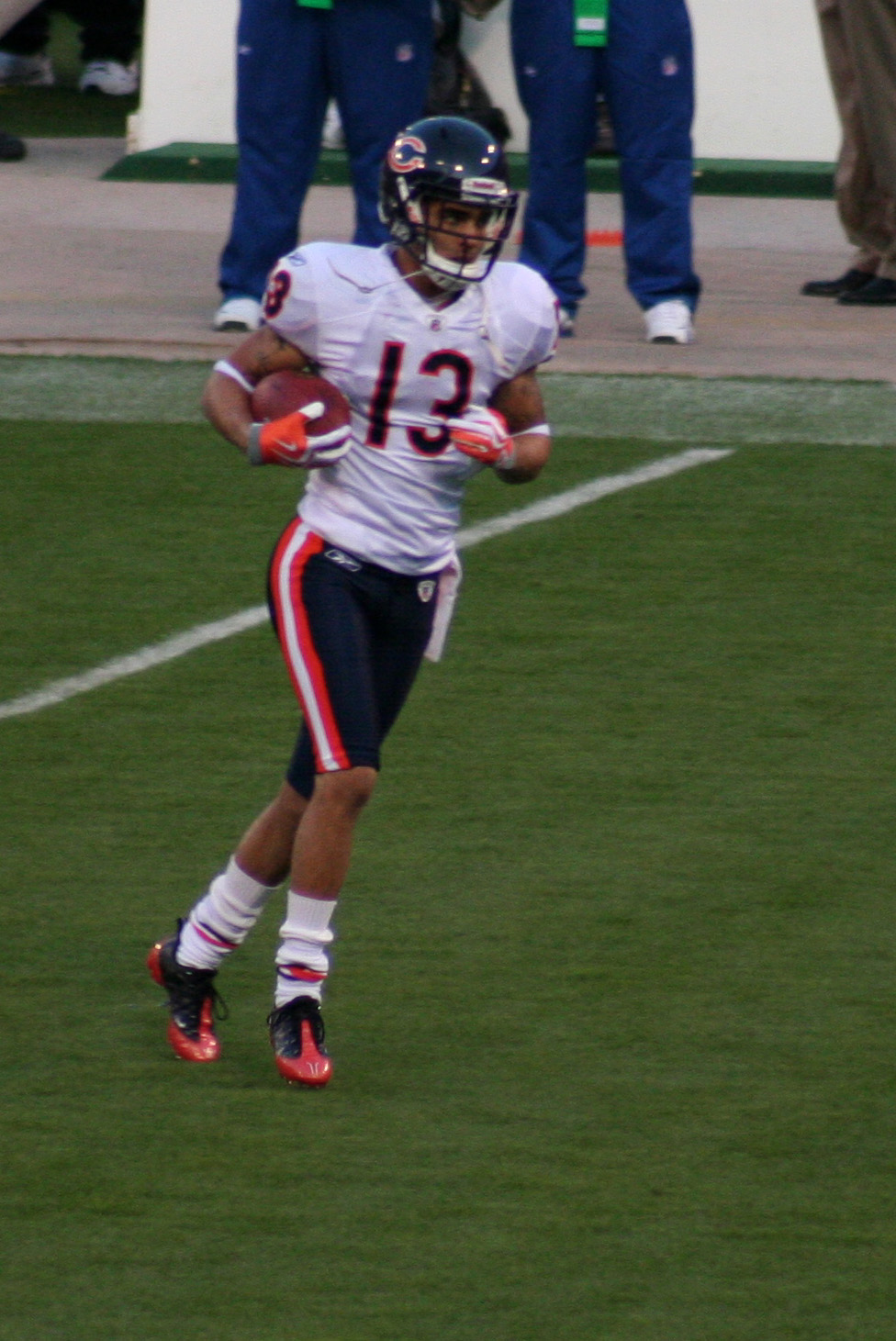
- Knox with the Chicago Bears in 2009

No. 13
- Positions: Wide receiver, return specialist

Personal information
- Born: November 3, 1986 (age 40); Houston, Texas, U.S.
- Listed height: 6 ft 0 in (1.83 m)
- Listed weight: 185 lb (84 kg)

Career information
- High school: Channelview (Channelview, Texas)
- College: Tyler JC (2005–2006); Abilene Christian (2007–2008)
- NFL draft: 2009: 5th round, 140th overall pick

Career history

Playing
- Chicago Bears (2009–2012)

Coaching
- Tampa Bay Buccaneers (2015) Seasonal intern

Awards and highlights
- Pro Bowl (2009)

Career NFL statistics
- Receptions: 133
- Receiving yards: 2,214
- Return yards: 1,515
- Total touchdowns: 13
- Stats at Pro Football Reference

Johnny Otis Knox II (born November 3, 1986) is an American former professional football player who was a wide receiver for three seasons with the Chicago Bears of the National Football League (NFL). He played college football for Abilene Christian University. He was selected by the Bears as the 140th overall pick in the 2009 NFL draft. Knox's career abruptly ended after sustaining a severe spinal injury in 2011. When it became apparent he would never be cleared to play again, he retired in 2013. Knox was also a coaching intern for the Tampa Bay Buccaneers in 2015.

== Early life ==
After graduating in 2005 from Channelview High School in Channelview, Texas, Knox enrolled at Tyler Junior College. As a sophomore at Tyler, he led all junior college receivers with 884 yards and 12 touchdowns. Rivals.com rated him as the No. 9 junior college receiver in the class of 2007, and he transferred to Abilene Christian University to play for the Abilene Christian Wildcats football team. He went into his first season at Abilene Christian listed as a backup wide receiver, but he quickly moved into a starting role. He finished the season with 62 receptions for 1,158 yards and a school-record 17 touchdowns. He finished third in Division II in 2007 in touchdown receptions, while racking up the fourth-most receiving yards in a season in Abilene Christian history.

While garnering more attention from defenses in 2008, Knox still racked up 56 receptions for 1,069 yards and 13 touchdowns. Knox helped Abilene Christian start 11–0 before losing in the third round of the Division II playoffs. His 30 touchdown receptions in two seasons were the most in Abilene Christian history, and he earned second-team All-America honors in 2008. After the 2008 season, Knox was invited to participate in the 2009 Texas vs The Nation all-star game, where he had three receptions for 55 yards and caught a touchdown pass from David Johnson in a losing effort for the Texas team.

== Professional career ==
=== 2009 NFL Combine ===
Pre-draft measurables
Height	Weight	Arm length	Hand span	40-yard dash	10-yard split	20-yard split	20-yard shuttle	Three-cone drill	Vertical jump	Broad jump
5 ft 11 1/2 in (1.82 m)	185 lb (84 kg)	31 in (0.79 m)	9 in (0.23 m)	4.34 s	1.54 s	2.56 s	4.15 s	6.81 s	35 in (0.89 m)	10 ft 2 in (3.10 m)
All values from NFL Combine

=== Chicago Bears ===
Knox joined the Chicago Bears after being chosen in the fifth round of the 2009 NFL draft with the 140th overall pick. He caught his first NFL pass, a 68-yard reception, on September 13, 2009, against the Green Bay Packers. During the second game of the 2009 season (against the Pittsburgh Steelers), Knox recorded his first NFL touchdown catch on a key third down to tie the game up 14–14. He recorded another touchdown against the Seattle Seahawks, a seven-yard reception. In the fourth game of the season, against the Detroit Lions, he scored a touchdown on a 102-yard kickoff return. Two weeks later, after a bye week, Knox caught a 60-yard touchdown from Jay Cutler. On November 29, 2009, Knox returned a kickoff 77 yards to set up a Bears field goal versus the Vikings.

Knox sustained a season-ending ankle injury against the Vikings. He finished the 2009 season with 45 receptions for 527 yards and five touchdowns. Knox ranked second in the NFL for return yard average with 29.0. On January 25, 2010, Knox was selected to the NFC roster for the 2010 Pro Bowl, replacing Minnesota's Percy Harvin, who withdrew due to injury concerns. Knox returned four kicks for 103 yards in his Pro Bowl debut. He was also targeted on two passes as a wide receiver, but failed to log a reception.

In 2010, Knox led the Bears in receiving yards (960), and tied for first in the team for receptions (51) and receiving touchdowns (5). In 2011, he led the Bears in receiving yards (727) and ranked second in the NFL in yards per reception (19.6).

On December 18, 2011, Knox sustained a serious spinal cord injury during a game against the Seattle Seahawks. He collided with Anthony Hargrove head-on while attempting to recover a fumble. Knox required immediate surgery to stabilize an injured vertebra, but maintained sensation in all limbs following the incident. Hargrove later expressed remorse for his role in the injury. The Bears placed Knox on injured reserve the following day.

Knox started the 2012 NFL season on Chicago's 'physically unable-to-perform' (PUP) list. He was unable to fully recover from the injury even after extensive rehabilitation and therapy. After the injury, Knox walked with a limp and was unable to stand without discomfort. The Bears released Knox on February 12, 2013. He announced his retirement on February 13.

== Post-playing career ==
On July 31, 2015, Knox was hired by former Bears head coach Lovie Smith as a coaching intern with the Tampa Bay Buccaneers.

In 2018, he and former Bear Nathan Vasher joined the football staff at Carmel High School, where they worked under another former Bear in Blake Annen. The three had previously worked together at EFT Football Academy in Highland Park.

== Personal life ==
Knox and his wife have four children.
