= Clifton D. Bryant =

American sociologist

Clifton D. Bryant (December 25, 1932 – Blacksburg, Virginia, September 13, 2010) was an American sociologist and Professor of Sociology at Virginia Tech, College of Liberal Arts and Human Sciences. He was particularly noted for detecting "carnal computer and erotic cyberspace as an emerging research frontier" and his 1999 paper on "propagandizing pederasty."

== Biography ==
Bryant obtained his BA in sociology at the University of Mississippi, his MA in sociology at the Louisiana State University and his Phd in Labor Economics at the University of North Carolina.

Bryant had started his academic career at the University of Georgia, and moved to Virginia Tech in 1972 where he was appointed Professor of Sociology. At Virginia Tech he chaired the Department of Sociology, and served until his retirement in 2007. Bryant was Professor at the Millsaps College and at the Western Kentucky University. He was visiting professor at the National Taiwan University, and at the Xavier University in Mindanao.

Bryant was awarded the Fulbright Summer Award twice, and inducted into the Honor Roll of Fame of the Southern Sociological Society, where he also had served as president. He also served as president of the Mid-South Sociological Association from 1981 to 1982 and received the association's Distinguished Career Award in 1991 and Distinguished Book Award in 2001 and 2004.

== Selected publications ==
- Bryant, Clifton D. Deviant behavior: Occupational and organizational bases. Rand McNally College Publishing Company, 1974.
- Bryant, Clifton D., ed. Handbook of death and dying. Vol. 1. Sage, 2003.
- Bryant, Clifton D., and Dennis L. Peck, eds. 21st century sociology: a reference handbook. SAGE Publications, 2006.

Articles, a selection:

- Durkin, Keith F., and Clifton D. Bryant. ""Log on to sex": Some notes on the carnal computer and erotic cyberspace as an emerging research frontier." Deviant Behavior Volume 16, Issue 3, 1995: 179–200.
- Durkin, Keith F., and Clifton D. Bryant. "Propagandizing pederasty: A thematic analysis of the on-line exculpatory accounts of unrepentant pedophiles." Deviant Behavior 20.2 (1999): 103–127.
