= List of Philadelphia Eagles starting quarterbacks =

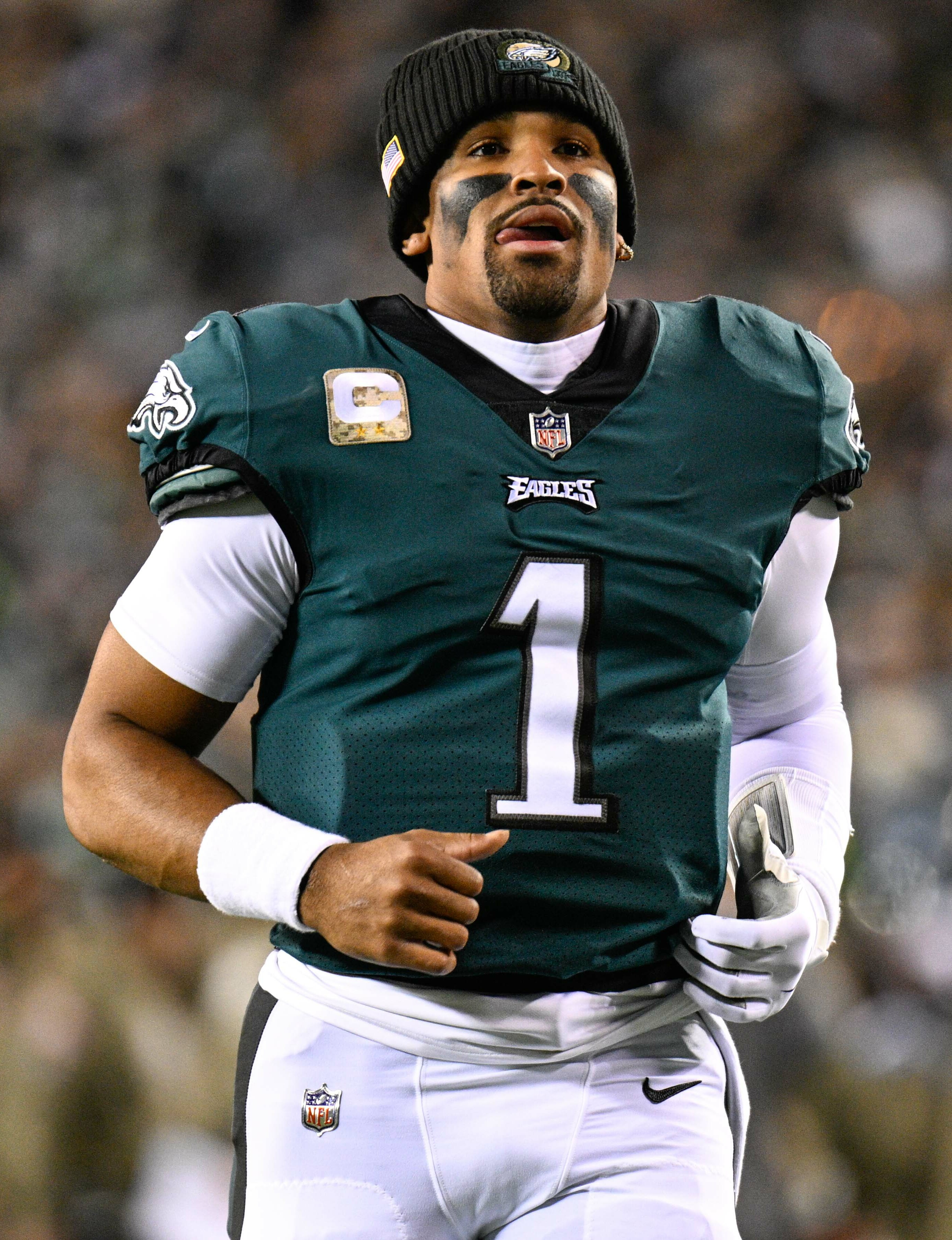
Jalen Hurts (2020–present), won Super Bowl LIX

These quarterbacks have started at least one game for the Philadelphia Eagles of the National Football League (NFL). They are listed in order of the date of each player's first start as the quarterback for the Eagles.

The early era of the NFL and American football in general was not conducive to passing the football, with the forward pass not being legalized until the early 1900s and not fully adopted for many more years. Although the quarterback position has historically been the one to receive the snap and thus handle the football on every offensive play, the importance of the position during this era was limited by various rules, like having to be five yards behind the line of scrimmage before a forward pass could be attempted. These rules and the tactical focus on rushing the ball limited the importance of the quarterback position while enhancing the value of different types of backs, such as the halfback and the fullback. Some of these backs were considered triple-threat men, capable of rushing, passing or kicking the football, making it common for multiple players to attempt a pass during a game.

As rules changed and the NFL began adopting a more pass-centric approach to offensive football, the importance of the quarterback position grew. Beginning in 1950, total wins and losses by a team's starting quarterback were tracked. Prior to 1950, the Eagles had numerous players identified as playing the quarterback position. However, the combination of unreliable statistics in the early era of the NFL and the differences in the early quarterback position make tracking starts by quarterbacks impractical for this timeframe.

== Regular season ==
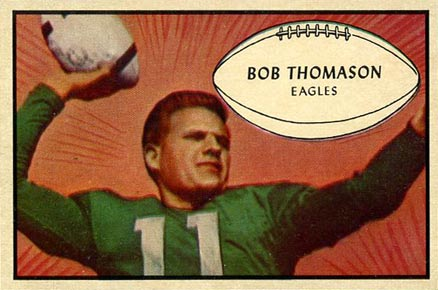
Bobby Thomason (1952–1957)

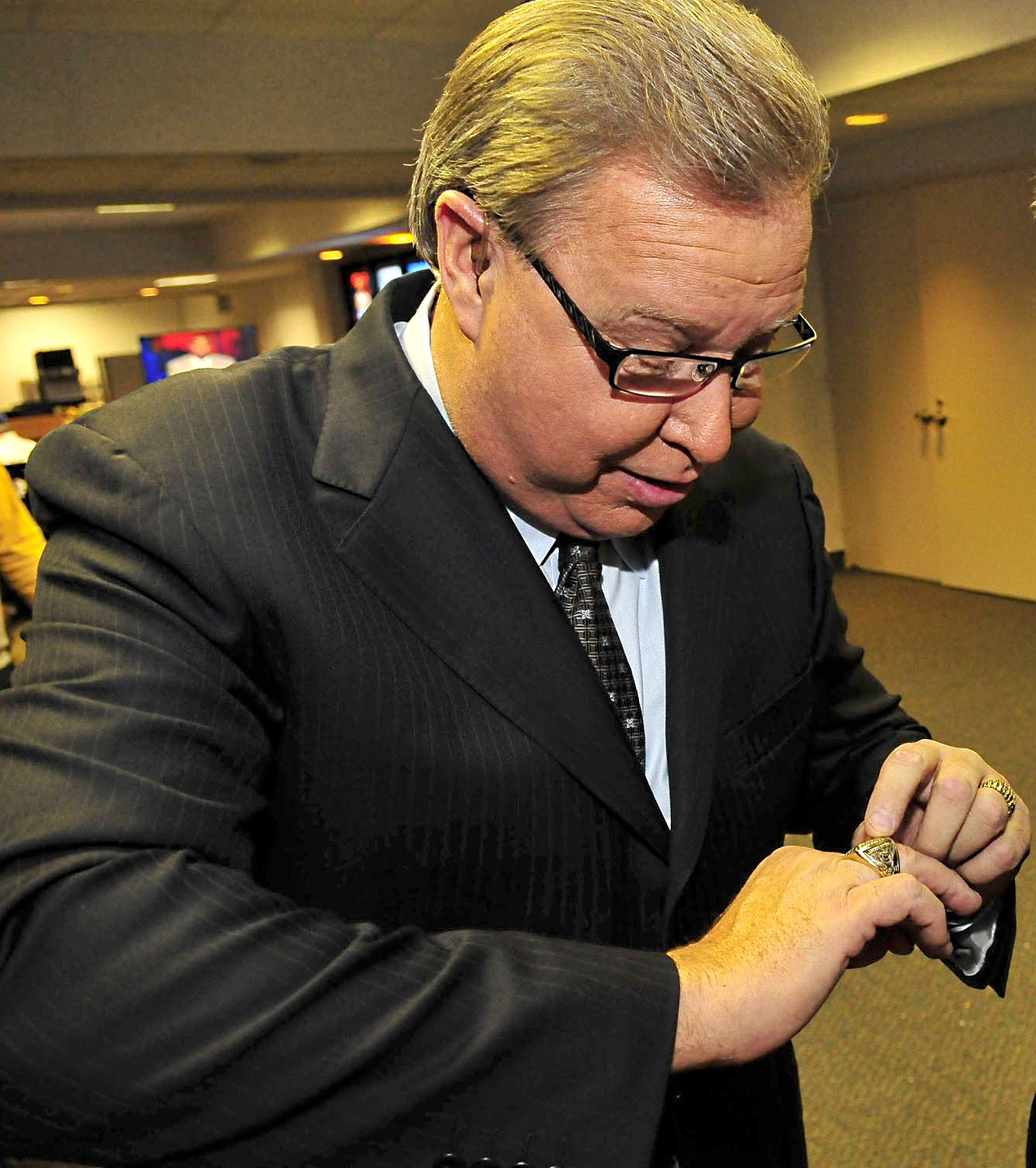
Ron Jaworski (1977–1986)

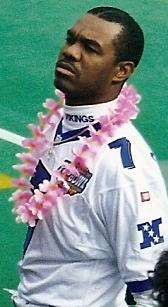
Randall Cunningham (1987–1995)

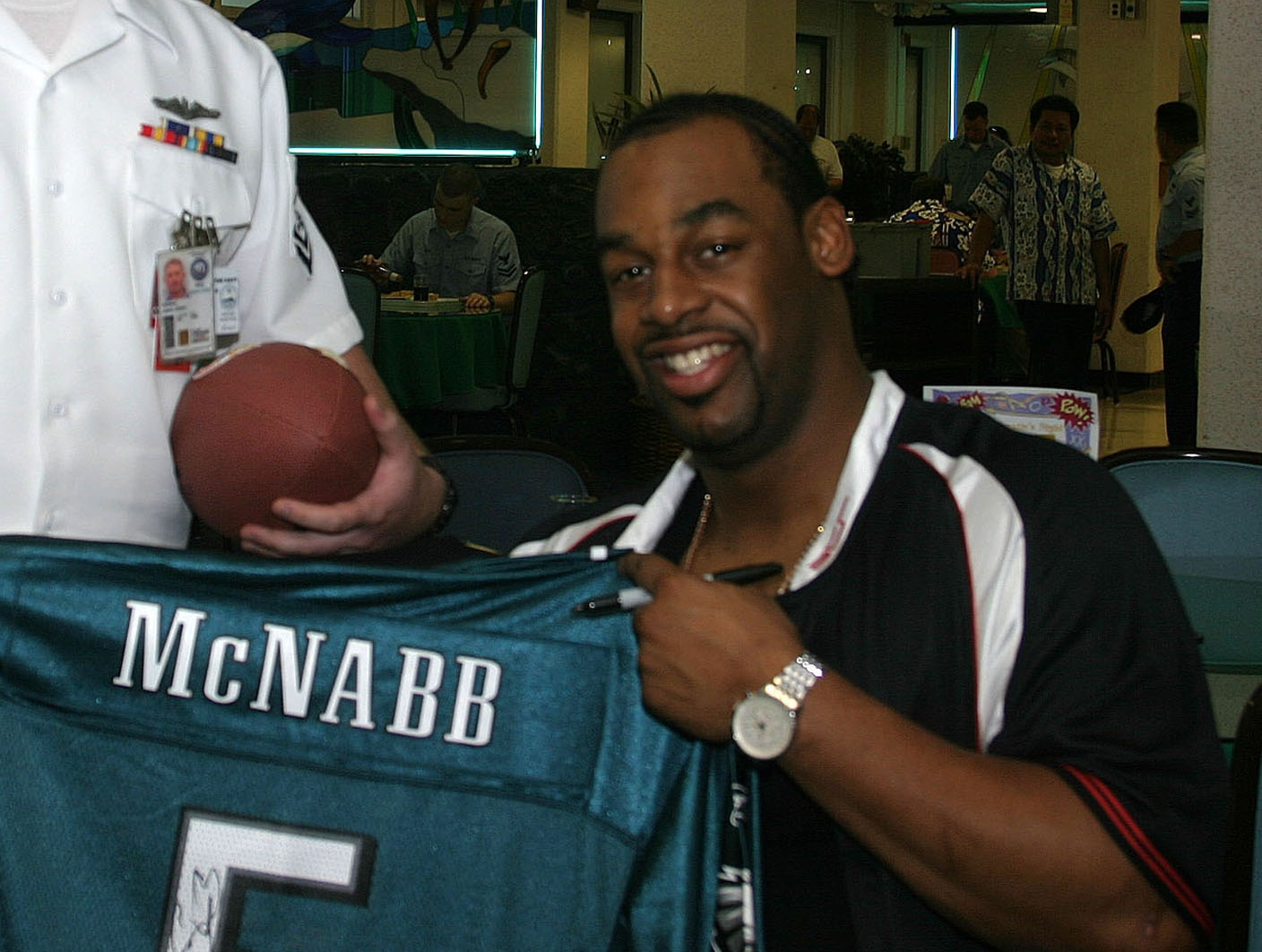
Donovan McNabb (1999–2009)

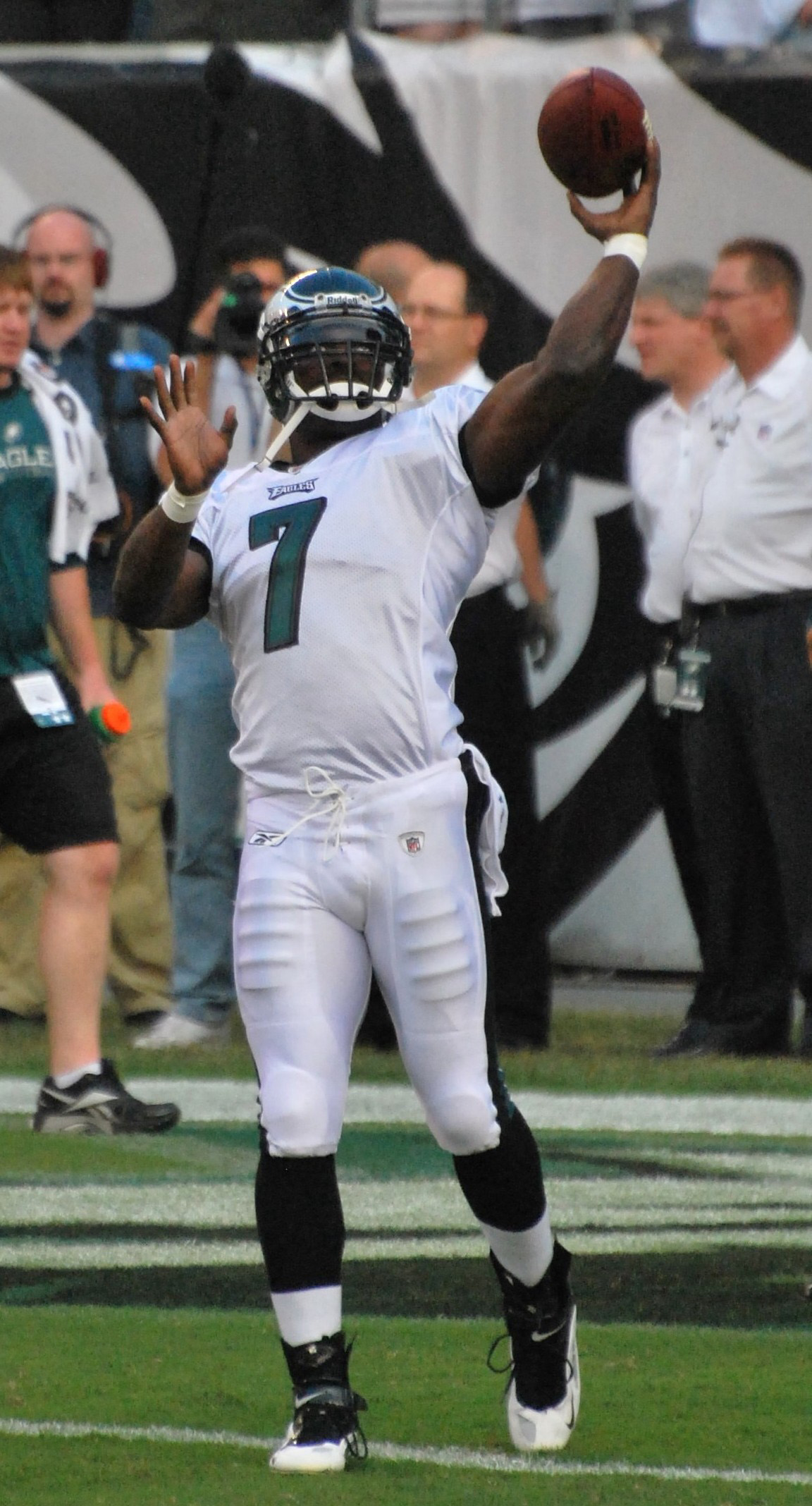
Michael Vick (2010–2013)

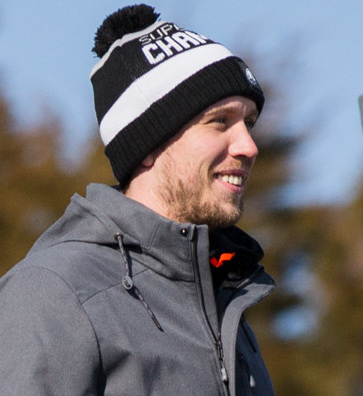
Nick Foles (2012–2014, 2017–2018), won Super Bowl LII

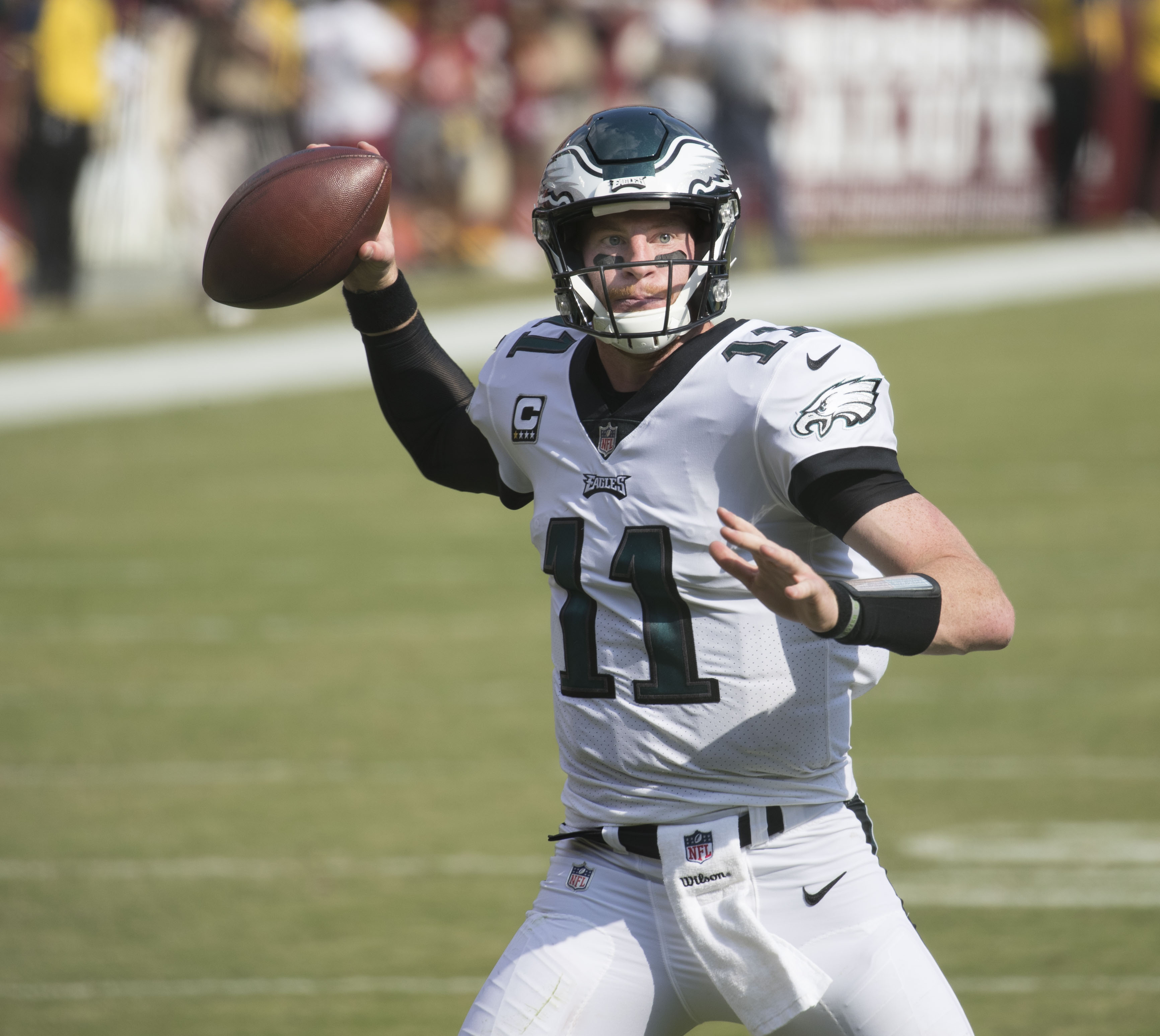
Carson Wentz (2016–2020)

The number of games they started during the season is listed to the right:

Season(s)	Quarterback(s)
1950	Tommy Thompson (12)
1951	Adrian Burk (12)
1952	Bobby Thomason (9) / Adrian Burk (3)
1953	Bobby Thomason (8) / Adrian Burk (4)
1954	Adrian Burk (8) / Bobby Thomason (4)
1955	Adrian Burk (9) / Bobby Thomason (3)
1956	Bobby Thomason (9) / Adrian Burk (3)
1957	Bobby Thomason (7) / Sonny Jurgensen (5)
1958	Norm Van Brocklin (12)
1959	Norm Van Brocklin (12)
1960	Norm Van Brocklin (12)
1961	Sonny Jurgensen (14)
1962	Sonny Jurgensen (13) / King Hill (1)
1963	Sonny Jurgensen (9) / King Hill (5)
1964	Norm Snead (10) / King Hill (2) / Jack Concannon (2)
1965	Norm Snead (10) / King Hill (4)
1966	Norm Snead (10) / King Hill (2) / Jack Concannon (2)
1967	Norm Snead (14)
1968	Norm Snead (11) / King Hill (2) / John Huarte (1)
1969	Norm Snead (13) / George Mira (1)
1970	Norm Snead (13) / Rick Arrington (1)
1971	Pete Liske (10) / Rick Arrington (4)
1972	John Reaves (7) / Pete Liske (7)
1973	Roman Gabriel (14)
1974	Roman Gabriel (11) / Mike Boryla (3)
1975	Roman Gabriel (9) / Mike Boryla (5)
1976	Mike Boryla (10) / Roman Gabriel (4)
1977	Ron Jaworski (14)
1978	Ron Jaworski (16)
1979	Ron Jaworski (16)
1980	Ron Jaworski (16)
1981	Ron Jaworski (16)
1982	Ron Jaworski (9)^{[a]}
1983	Ron Jaworski (16)
1984	Ron Jaworski (13) / Joe Pisarcik (3)
1985	Ron Jaworski (12) / Randall Cunningham (4)
1986	Ron Jaworski (9) / Randall Cunningham (5) / Matt Cavanaugh (2)
1987	Randall Cunningham (12) / Scott Tinsley (3)
1988	Randall Cunningham (16)
1989	Randall Cunningham (16)
1990	Randall Cunningham (16)
1991	Jim McMahon (11) / Jeff Kemp (2) / Brad Goebel (2)/ Randall Cunningham (1)
1992	Randall Cunningham (15) / Jim McMahon (1)
1993	Bubby Brister (8) / Ken O'Brien (4) / Randall Cunningham (4)
1994	Randall Cunningham (14) / Bubby Brister (2)
1995	Rodney Peete (12) / Randall Cunningham (4)
1996	Ty Detmer (11) / Rodney Peete (5)
1997	Ty Detmer (7) / Bobby Hoying (6) / Rodney Peete (3)
1998	Bobby Hoying (7) / Koy Detmer (5) / Rodney Peete (4)
1999	Doug Pederson (9) / Donovan McNabb (6) / Koy Detmer (1)
2000	Donovan McNabb (16)
2001	Donovan McNabb (16)
2002	Donovan McNabb (10) / A. J. Feeley (5) / Koy Detmer (1)
2003	Donovan McNabb (16)
2004	Donovan McNabb (15) / Koy Detmer (1)
2005	Donovan McNabb (9) / Mike McMahon (7)
2006	Donovan McNabb (10) / Jeff Garcia (6)
2007	Donovan McNabb (14) / A. J. Feeley (2)
2008	Donovan McNabb (16)
2009	Donovan McNabb (14) / Kevin Kolb (2)
2010	Michael Vick (11) / Kevin Kolb (5)
2011	Michael Vick (13) / Vince Young (3)
2012	Michael Vick (10) / Nick Foles (6)
2013	Michael Vick (6) / Nick Foles (10)
2014	Nick Foles (8) / Mark Sanchez (8)
2015	Sam Bradford (14) / Mark Sanchez (2)
2016	Carson Wentz (16)
2017	Carson Wentz (13) / Nick Foles (3)
2018	Carson Wentz (11) / Nick Foles (5)
2019	Carson Wentz (16)
2020	Carson Wentz (12) / Jalen Hurts (4)
2021	Jalen Hurts (15) / Gardner Minshew (2)
2022	Jalen Hurts (15) / Gardner Minshew (2)
2023	Jalen Hurts (17)
2024	Jalen Hurts (15) / Kenny Pickett (1) / Tanner McKee (1)
2025	Jalen Hurts (16) / Tanner McKee (1)
2026	Jalen Hurts (5) / Tanner McKee (3) / Joe Milton (1)

Notes:

^{a} Due to the 1982 Players' strike, only nine games were played in the 1982 season.

== Most games started ==
These quarterbacks have more than 50 starts for the Eagles in regular season games.

Name	Period	Starts	Wins	Losses	Ties	Win %
Donovan McNabb	1999–2009	142	92	49	1	.651
Ron Jaworski	1977–86	137	69	67	1	.507
Randall Cunningham	1986–95	107	63	43	1	.593
Jalen Hurts	2020–26	84	59	25	0	.702
Norm Snead	1964–70	81	28	50	3	.364
Carson Wentz	2016–20	68	35	32	1	.522

== Postseason ==
Season(s)	Quarterback(s)
1960	Norm Van Brocklin (1–0)
1978	Ron Jaworski (0–1)
1979	Ron Jaworski (1–1)
1980	Ron Jaworski (2–1)
1981	Ron Jaworski (0–1)
1988	Randall Cunningham (0–1)
1989	Randall Cunningham (0–1)
1990	Randall Cunningham (0–1)
1992	Randall Cunningham (1–1)
1995	Rodney Peete (1–1)
1996	Ty Detmer (0–1)
2000	Donovan McNabb (1–1)
2001	Donovan McNabb (2–1)
2002	Donovan McNabb (1–1)
2003	Donovan McNabb (1–1)
2004	Donovan McNabb (2–1)
2006	Jeff Garcia (1–1)
2008	Donovan McNabb (2–1)
2009	Donovan McNabb (0–1)
2010	Michael Vick (0–1)
2013	Nick Foles (0–1)
2017	Nick Foles (3–0)
2018	Nick Foles (1–1)
2019	Carson Wentz (0–1)
2021	Jalen Hurts (0–1)
2022	Jalen Hurts (2–1)
2023	Jalen Hurts (0–1)
2024	Jalen Hurts (4–0)
2025	Jalen Hurts (0–1)

== See also ==
- Lists of NFL starting quarterbacks
