= Family Christian Academy (Texas) =

Private Christian school

Coordinates: 29°46′53″N 95°9′26″W

Family Christian Academy (FCA) is a private Christian school in Channelview, unincorporated Harris County, Texas, in the Houston metropolitan area. It serves Pre-Kindergarten through Grade 12.
