= Adena Williams Loston =

American college president (born 1952)

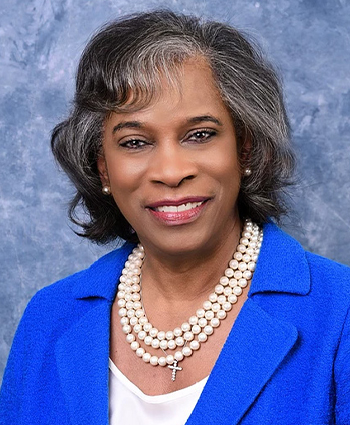
- Dr. Adena Williams Loston

14th President of St. Philip’s College
- Incumbent
- Assumed office 2007

Personal details
- Born: 1952 Mississippi
- Education: B.S. Alcorn State University, 1973, M.Ed. Bowling Green State University, 1974, Ph.D. Bowling Green State University, 1979
- Profession: Educator

Adena Williams Loston (born 1952) is the 14th president of St. Philip’s College. She was installed as the new president in ceremonies on March 1, 2007.

== Education ==
Loston earned her Bachelor of Science degree from Alcorn State University in 1973. She received her Master of Education and Doctor of Philosophy degrees from Bowling Green State University in 1974 and 1979 respectively. She also attended the Institute for Educational Management at Harvard University in 1996.

== Career ==
Loston has taught as an associate professor at Georgia State University and an instructor at Arkansas State University and Houston Community College. She also taught as an adjunct instructor at the University of Houston–Downtown and Texas Southern University.

She then was the Dean of Vocational Education, Budgets and Facilities, and Dean of Professional Programs at Santa Monica College, the Executive Dean/Provost in the El Paso Community College District, and ultimately as the President of San Jacinto College South, in Houston, Texas. She became the second president of San Jacinto College South and the first African-American president in the District.

Loston then was the director of education and special assistant for Suborbital and Special Orbital Projects Directorate for the Goddard Space Flight Center, Wallops Flight Facility and Chief Education Officer for the National Aeronautics and Space Administration at its headquarters in Washington, D.C. Her initial appointment at NASA was as the associate administrator for education on October 28, 2002, and prior to joining the agency, she served as the NASA Administrator’s senior education advisor starting in September 2002.

On October 26, 2023, President Joe Biden appointed Dr. Adena Williams Loston a Commissioner for the Presidential Advisory Commission on Advancing Educational Equity, Excellence, and Economic Opportunity for Black Americans.

== Awards and honors ==
Loston has been recognized with several awards, including:

- Outstanding Leadership Medal, from the National Aeronautics & Space Administration;
- National Aeronautics and Space Administration’s (NASA) Exceptional Achievement Medal from the Goddard Space Flight Center;
- Group Achievement Award, Educator Astronaut Program, National Aeronautics & Space Administration;
- Group Achievement Award, NASA Explorer Schools Program, National Aeronautics & Space Administration;
- Group Achievement Award, NASA’s Centennial of Flight Team, National Aeronautics & Space Administration
