= Jalen Hurts =

American football player (born 1998)

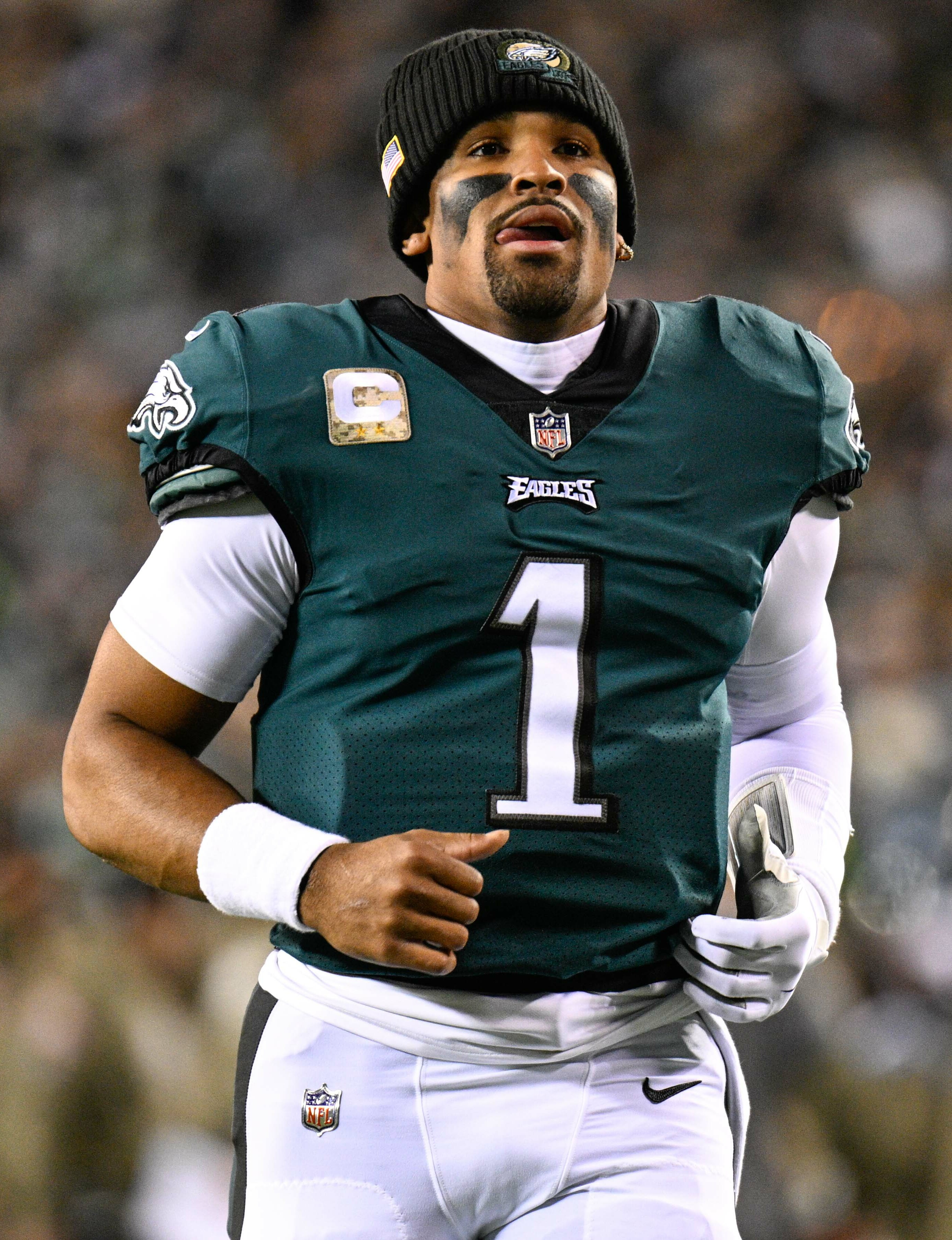
- Hurts with the Philadelphia Eagles in 2022

No. 1 – Philadelphia Eagles
- Position: Quarterback
- Roster status: Injured reserve

Personal information
- Born: August 7, 1998 (age 28); Houston, Texas, U.S.
- Listed height: 6 ft 1 in (1.85 m)
- Listed weight: 223 lb (101 kg)

Career information
- High school: Channelview (Channelview, Texas)
- College: Alabama (2016–2018); Oklahoma (2019)
- NFL draft: 2020: 2nd round, 53rd overall pick

Career history
- Philadelphia Eagles (2020–present)

Awards and highlights
- Super Bowl champion (LIX); Super Bowl MVP (LIX); Second-team All-Pro (2022); 3× Pro Bowl (2022, 2023, 2025); Bert Bell Award (2022); CFP national champion (2017); Third-team All-American (2019); Big 12 Offensive Newcomer of the Year (2019); First-team All-Big 12 (2019); First-team All-SEC (2016); SEC Offensive Player of the Year (2016); SEC Freshman of the Year (2016); NFL records: Most rushing touchdowns by a quarterback in a single season: 15 (2023, tied with Josh Allen); Most rushing touchdowns in a postseason game by a quarterback: 3; Most rushing yards in a Super Bowl by a quarterback: 72; Most points scored in a Super Bowl by a single player: 20 (tied with James White)

Career NFL statistics as of 2026
- Passing attempts: 2,547
- Passing completions: 1,631
- Completion percentage: 64.0%
- TD–INT: 118–48
- Passing yards: 18,824
- Passer rating: 93.8
- Rushing yards: 3,661
- Rushing touchdowns: 64
- Stats at Pro Football Reference

Jalen Alexander Hurts (born August 7, 1998) is an American professional football quarterback for the Philadelphia Eagles of the National Football League (NFL). He began his college football career with the Alabama Crimson Tide, leading the team to consecutive College Football Playoff National Championship appearances in 2016 and 2017. After three seasons at Alabama, Hurts used his final year of eligibility with the Oklahoma Sooners and made an appearance in the 2019–20 College Football Playoff.

Hurts was selected by the Eagles in the second round of the 2020 NFL draft, becoming their starter near the end of his rookie season. He had a breakout season in 2022 when he led the Eagles to their conference's top seed and an appearance in Super Bowl LVII, earning him Pro Bowl and second-team All-Pro honors. Two years later, Hurts won Super Bowl LIX and was named Super Bowl MVP. As the team's starting quarterback, he has led the Eagles to a total of five playoff appearances, three division titles, and two Super Bowl appearances. He has also received three Pro Bowl selections.

== Early life ==
Hurts attended Channelview High School in Channelview, Texas. Hurts' father, Averion, was the football coach at Channelview High School throughout his son's high school career. As a senior, he passed for 2,384 yards with 26 touchdown passes and rushed for 1,391 yards and 25 touchdowns. Hurts was a second-team all-district selection as a sophomore and was named the District 21-6A Overall MVP as a junior during his high school playing years. Throughout his high school career Hurts was rated as a four-star recruit and was ranked among the top dual-threat quarterbacks in the class of 2016. Although Texas A&M made a strong push to recruit Hurts, Hurts committed to the University of Alabama on June 5, 2015. He was recruited by Alabama's defensive line coach Bo Davis and offensive coordinator Lane Kiffin.

In addition to football, Hurts participated in powerlifting. As a sophomore in high school, Hurts was squatting 500 pounds (230 kg) of weight and would eventually become regional finalist in the 198-pound weight class.

== College career ==
=== Alabama ===
==== Freshman season ====
As a true freshman for the Alabama Crimson Tide football team in 2016, Hurts competed to open the season as the starting quarterback. Blake Barnett started the first game against the USC Trojans, but by the second game, Hurts had taken over the starting role, becoming the first true freshman to start at quarterback for Alabama in 32 years (Vince Sutton in 1984 was the last).

Hurts produced a historic freshman season under head coach Nick Saban. He threw for 2,780 yards and 23 touchdowns with nine interceptions. His completion percentage was at 62.8 percent, and he finished the season with a quarterback rating of 139.12. He rushed for a total of 954 yards and 13 touchdowns, breaking the school single-season record for rushing yards by a quarterback, surpassing Steadman Shealy's previous record of 791 yards. He finished the 2016 season with 36 overall touchdowns breaking the previous record for touchdowns in a single season for the Crimson Tide (35) set by Blake Sims in 2014. Hurts became the first quarterback coached by Nick Saban to rush for more than 11 touchdowns in a single season. He was the first player in Alabama history to pass for 300 yards and rush for 100 yards in the same game and the first quarterback to rush for 120 yards or more in multiple games.

In the Iron Bowl game against Auburn, Hurts completed 75% of his passes, which set a new Iron Bowl record. Alabama concluded the 2016 regular season with a perfect 12–0 (8–0 SEC) record. On November 30, 2016, Hurts was declared one of the ten finalists for the Manning Award, which is given to the nation's top college quarterback. On December 3, 2016, he led his team to win the 2016 SEC Championship by a score of 54–16 over the Florida Gators and was subsequently named SEC Offensive Player of the Year, SEC Freshman of the Year, and received Freshman All-American from several publications. Hurts was featured on the cover page of Sports Illustrated College Football Playoff magazine on December 6, 2016. On January 9, 2017, top-seeded Alabama lost the 2017 College Football Playoff National Championship against the Clemson Tigers by a score of 35–31. The bowl game was played at Raymond James Stadium in Tampa. Hurts passed and rushed for a touchdown in the loss.

==== Sophomore season ====
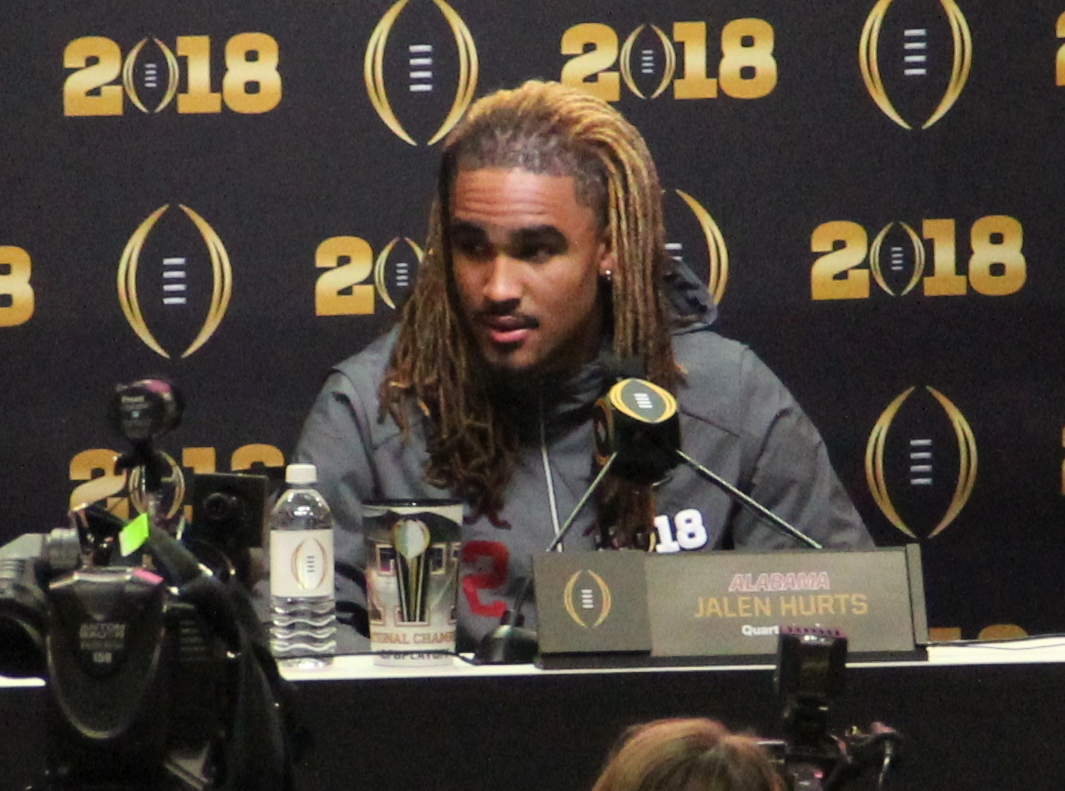
Hurts with Alabama in 2018

In 2017, Hurts led the Tide to an 11–1 regular season record, losing 26–14 to Auburn in the regular season finale. The Tide still qualified for the College Football Playoff as the #4 seed, where they played Clemson in the 2018 Sugar Bowl semifinal. Hurts was the offensive MVP for the 24–6 win.

Going up against the Georgia Bulldogs in the 2018 College Football Playoff National Championship, Alabama fell behind 13–0 at halftime, and Hurts was benched in favor of true freshman Tua Tagovailoa. Tagovailoa led the Crimson Tide to a come-from-behind 26–23 victory in overtime. Hurts finished the 2017 season with 2,081 passing yards, 17 passing touchdowns, and one interception to go along with 855 rushing yards and eight rushing touchdowns.

==== Junior season ====
After Tagovailoa led the Crimson Tide to victory in the National Championship the year before, questions arose if Hurts would remain the starting quarterback for Alabama. In the season opener against Louisville, Tagovailoa was the starter. Hurts came into the game in a rotation. He had 70 passing yards in the 51–14 victory. Tagovailoa was officially named the starter going into the next game against Arkansas State. In a backup role, Hurts earned significant playing time in the 2018 season. He made ten appearances in the regular season, passing for seven touchdowns.

In the 2018 SEC Championship Game, he relieved an injured Tagovailoa and led the team to a 35–28 comeback victory against Georgia. Alabama moved to 13–0 and secured a spot in the College Football Playoff.

Hurts completed his B.A. in communication and information sciences in December 2018.

=== Oklahoma ===
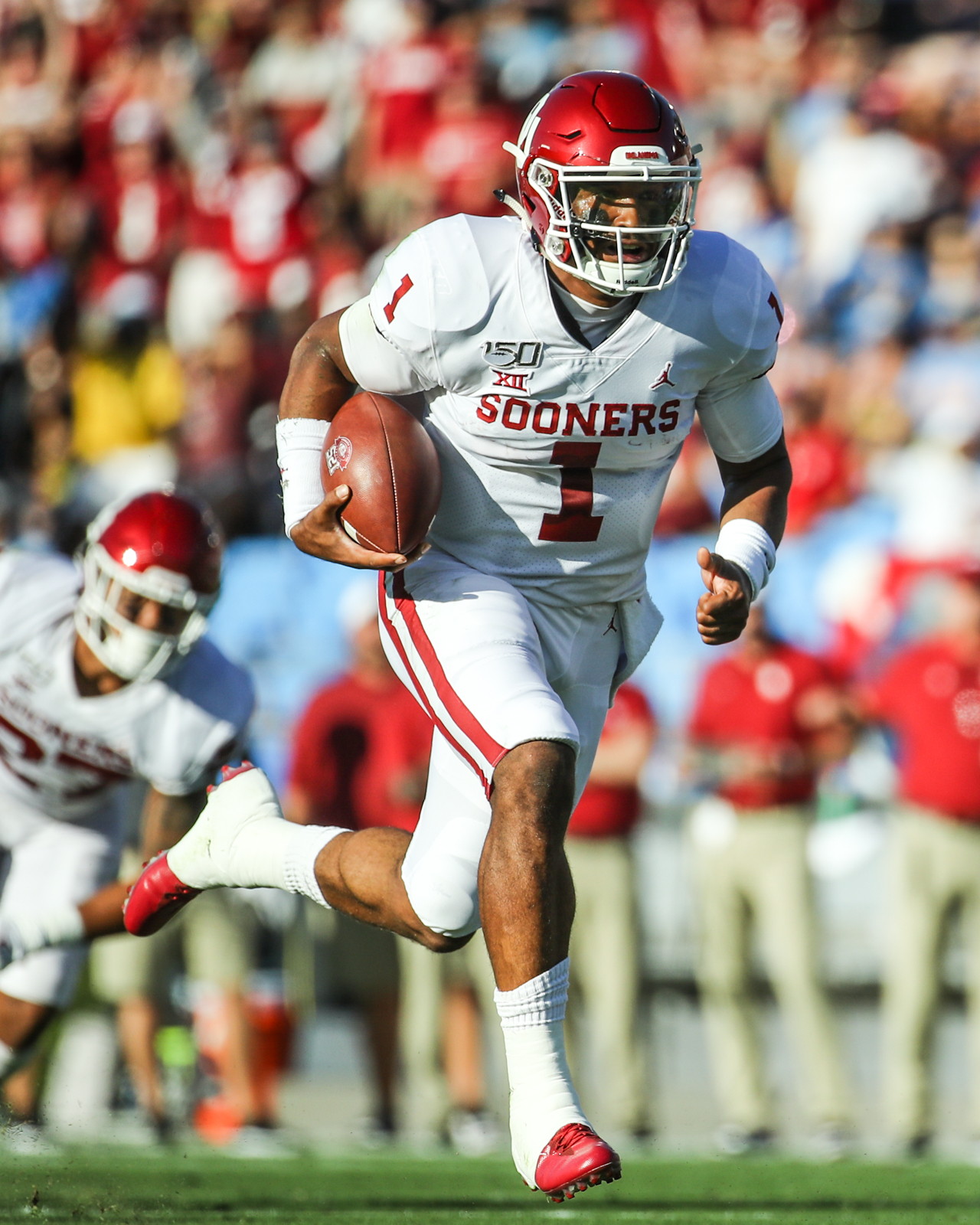
Hurts with Oklahoma in 2019

On January 16, 2019, Hurts announced via social media he would use his final year of eligibility to transfer to the University of Oklahoma to play for the Sooners. As a graduate transfer, he was eligible to play for the 2019 season.

In his first game as a Sooner on September 1, 2019, Hurts shattered Oklahoma's single-game yardage record in a debut (previously held by Baker Mayfield when he put up 396 yards of total offense against Akron in 2015), putting up 508 yards of total offense against Houston. On September 28, in a 55–14 victory over Texas Tech, he had 415 passing yards, three passing touchdowns, and one interception to go along with nine carries for 70 rushing yards and a rushing touchdown. Hurts helped lead Oklahoma to a 7–0 start to the season. The team's first setback came against Kansas State on October 26. In the 48–41 loss, Hurts passed for 395 yards and a passing touchdown to go along with 19 carries for 96 rushing yards and three rushing touchdowns.

Hurts helped lead Oklahoma to a Big 12 Championship and a spot in the College Football Playoff. The Sooners' season ended with a 63–28 loss to LSU in the 2019 Peach Bowl. Hurts recorded a successful season with the Sooners, recording 3,851 passing yards, 32 passing touchdowns, and eight interceptions to go along with 1,298 rushing yards and 20 rushing touchdowns. He finished second in the Heisman Trophy voting to Joe Burrow.

Hurts' improvement at Oklahoma was further reflected in his rise from a questionable NFL prospect at Alabama to earning early-round NFL Draft projections following his sole season as a Sooner.

Hurts completed his M.A. in human relations in May 2023.

== Professional career ==
Pre-draft measurables
Height	Weight	Arm length	Hand span	Wingspan	40-yard dash	10-yard split	20-yard split	Vertical jump	Broad jump	Wonderlic
6 ft 1 in (1.85 m)	222 lb (101 kg)	31 3/4 in (0.81 m)	9 3/4 in (0.25 m)	6 ft 5 5/8 in (1.97 m)	4.59 s	1.53 s	2.65 s	35.0 in (0.89 m)	10 ft 5 in (3.18 m)	21
All values from NFL Combine

=== 2020 season ===
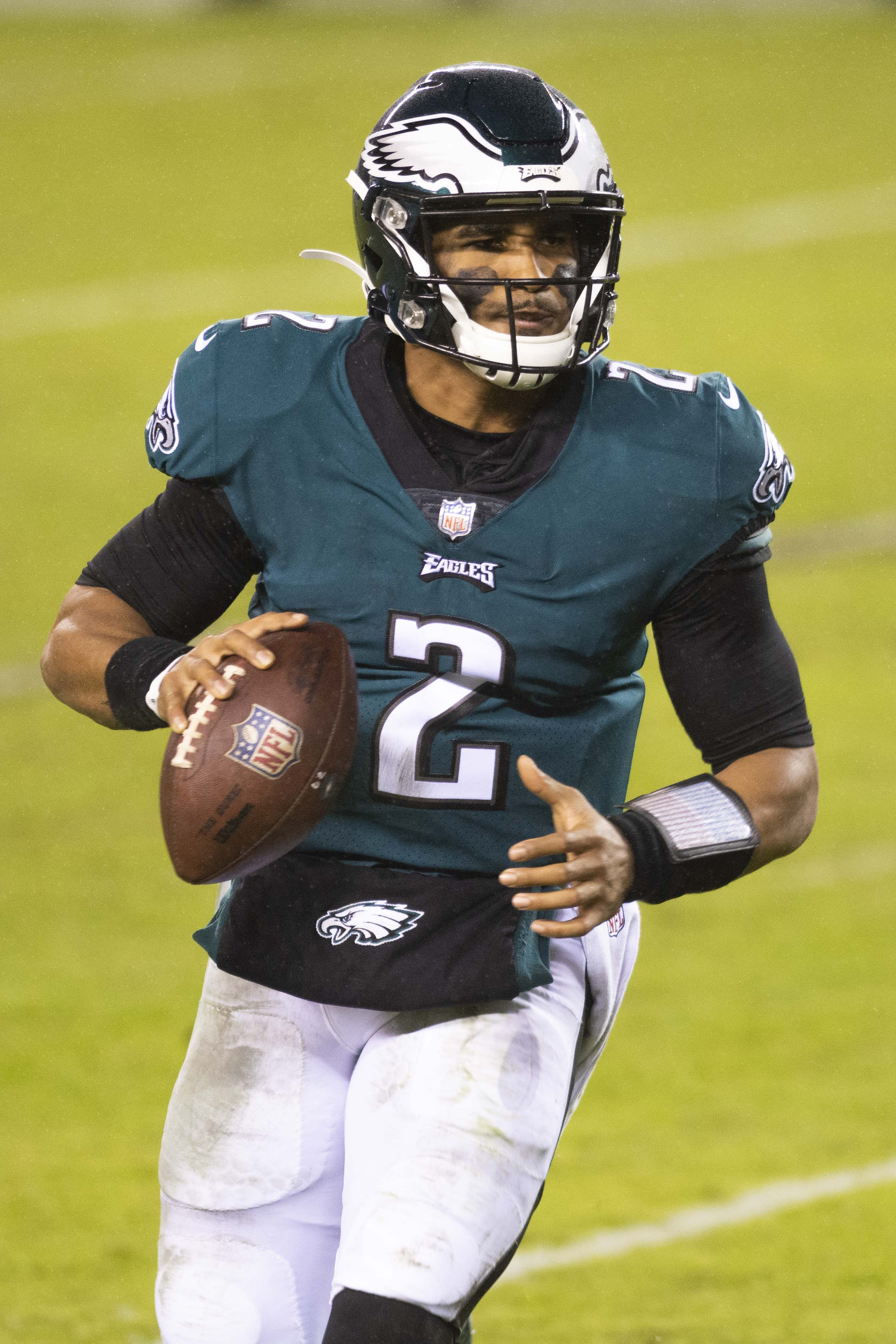
Hurts during his rookie season with the Eagles

The Philadelphia Eagles selected Hurts 53rd overall in the second round of the 2020 NFL draft. After originally being named the third-string quarterback behind Nate Sudfeld, he gained the backup position at Week 2, mainly so he could be used for quarterback runs or as a decoy.

On December 6, 2020, Hurts relieved Carson Wentz, who was benched due to ineffective play, against the Green Bay Packers. In this Week 13 matchup, Hurts threw his career first passing touchdown to Greg Ward and finished with 109 passing yards with a touchdown and an interception in the 30–16 loss. On December 8, 2020, Hurts was named the starter for their Week 14 game against the New Orleans Saints. In his first NFL start, Hurts completed 17 of 30 passing attempts for 167 passing yards and one touchdown, leading the Eagles to a 24–21 win. Hurts also added 106 rushing yards, totaling 273 all purpose yards. On December 20, 2020, in Week 15 against the Arizona Cardinals, Hurts finished with 338 passing yards, three passing touchdowns, 63 rushing yards and one rushing touchdown in the 33–26 loss. In Week 16 against the Dallas Cowboys, Hurts threw for 342 yards, one touchdown, two interceptions, and rushed for 69 yards during the 37–17 loss.

In Week 17 against the Washington Football Team on Sunday Night Football, Hurts threw for 72 yards and an interception and rushed for 34 yards and two touchdowns before being benched in favor of Sudfeld during the 20–14 loss. Hurts's benching drew allegations of Eagles head coach Doug Pederson attempting to deliberately lose the game; Pederson was fired shortly afterwards.

=== 2021 season ===
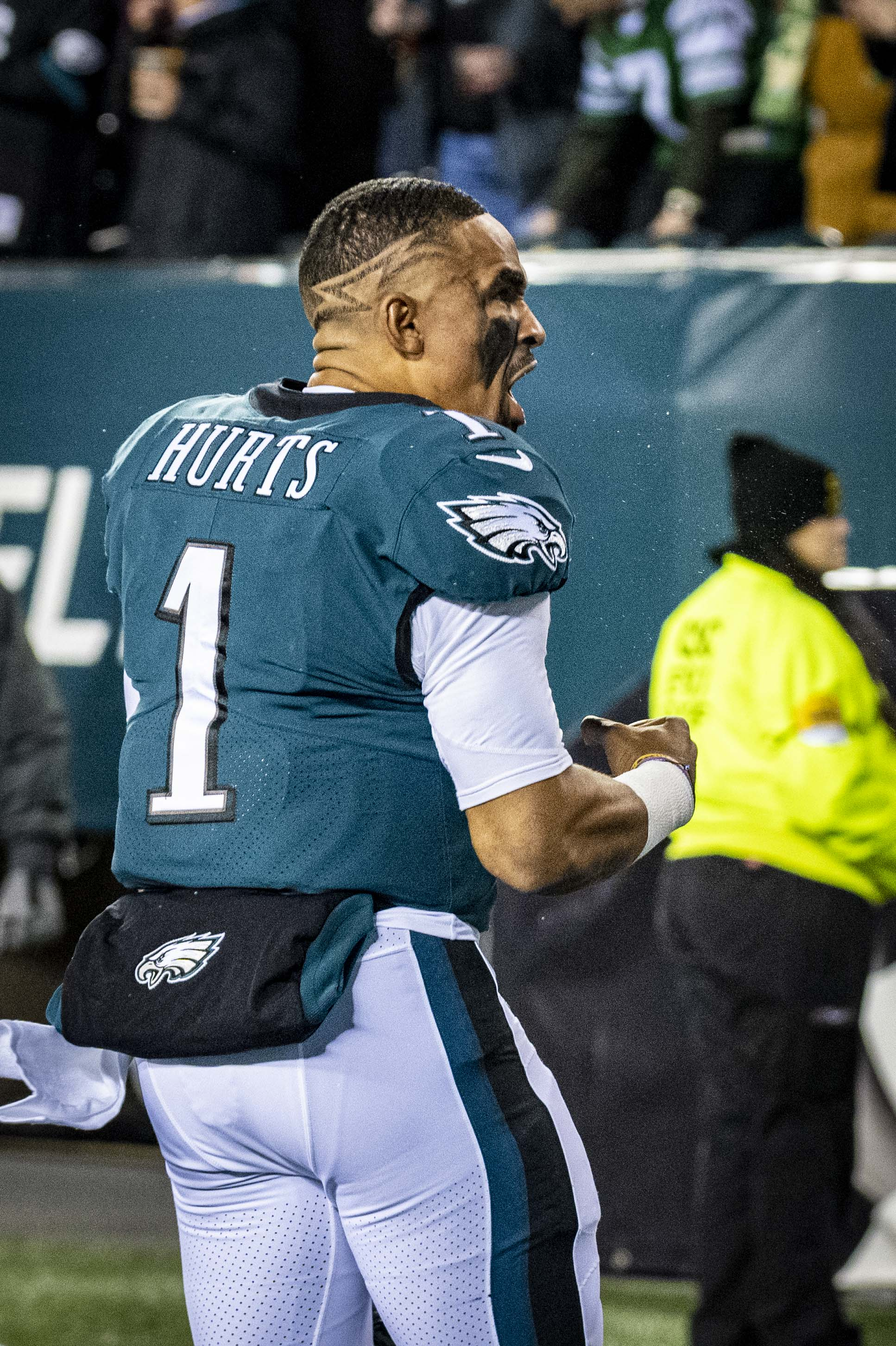
Hurts during a game in 2021

Before the start of the regular season, Hurts switched his jersey number to No. 1, which had become available with the departure of punter Cameron Johnston. On August 31, 2021, Hurts was named the starter for the regular season by new head coach Nick Sirianni.

In the season opener against the Atlanta Falcons, Hurts led the Eagles to a 32–6 victory, throwing for three touchdowns and a passer rating of 126.4. Throughout the season, the Eagles would run the earliest versions of their Tush Push play, with Hurts being pushed from behind by fullback Jack Stoll in Week 5 against the Carolina Panthers for a rushing touchdown, and by tight end Dallas Goedert in Week 11 against the New Orleans Saints for a first down. During a Week 12 loss to the New York Giants, Hurts suffered an ankle injury which kept him out for the following week's game against the New York Jets. The Eagles won that game 33–18 led by backup quarterback Gardner Minshew. Hurts returned after the bye week in a Week 15 matchup against Washington en route to a 27–17 victory.

Hurts helped lead the Eagles to a playoff berth after defeating the Washington Football Team 20–16 in Week 17 and with wins from the San Francisco 49ers and Packers later that day. On December 23, 2021, Hurts was named a 2021 Pro Bowl National Football Conference (NFC) alternate. In the 2021 season, Hurts finished with 3,144 passing yards, 16 passing touchdowns, and nine interceptions to go along with 139 carries for 784 rushing yards and ten rushing touchdowns. He led all quarterbacks in rushing yards and rushing touchdowns in the 2021 season.

In the Wild Card Round against the Tampa Bay Buccaneers, Hurts threw for 258 yards and a touchdown, but he fumbled once and threw two interceptions in the 31–15 loss.

=== 2022 season: NFL MVP runner-up and first Super Bowl appearance ===
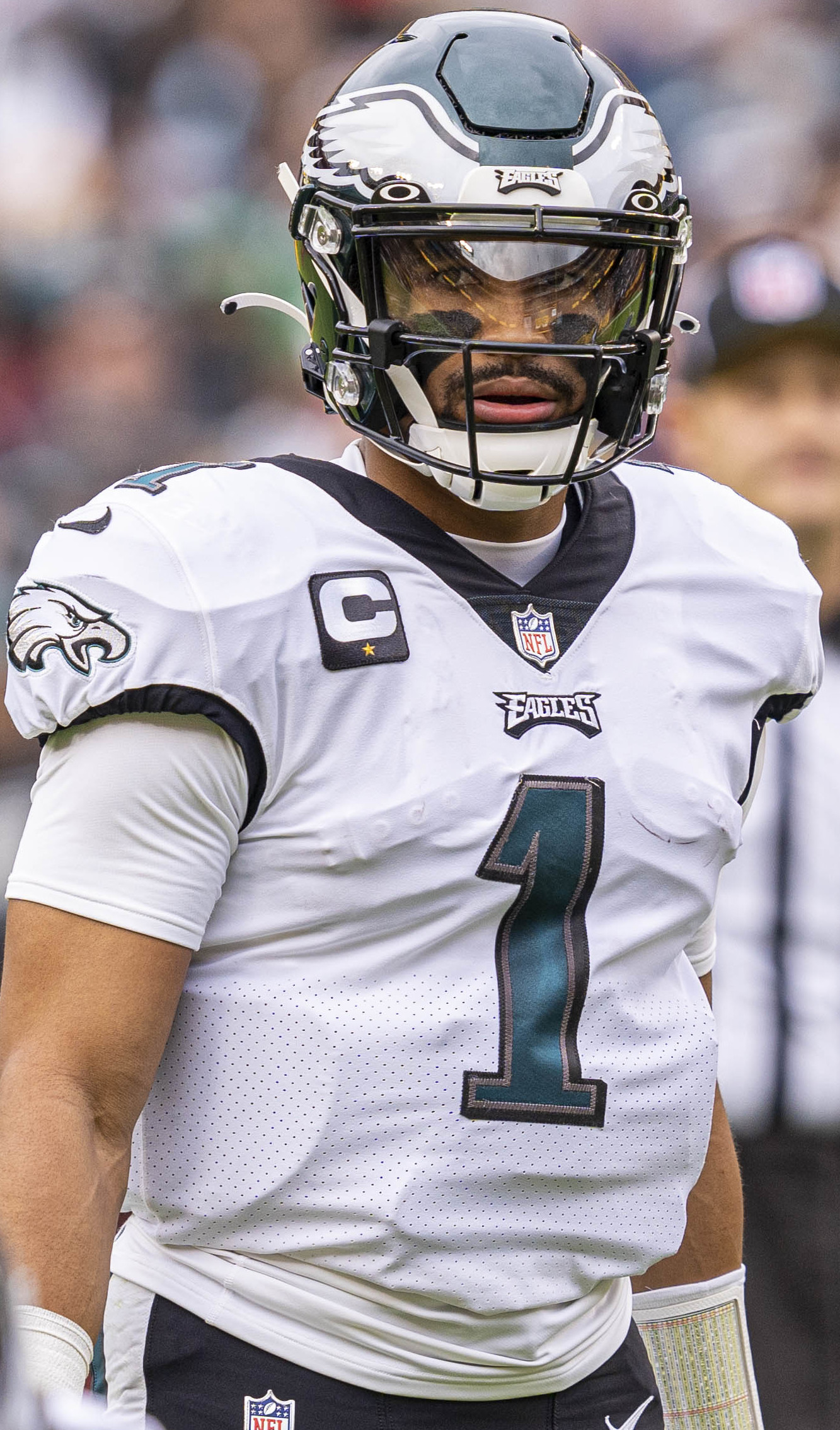
Hurts in 2022

In a Week 1 38–35 win against the Detroit Lions, Hurts put up 243 passing yards and 90 rushing yards with a rushing score. During Monday Night Football against the Vikings in Week 2, Hurts threw for 333 yards, a touchdown, and an interception and rushed for 57 yards and two touchdowns during the 24–7 victory. The following week, Hurts completed 22 of his 35 pass attempts for 340 yards and three touchdowns over the Washington Commanders in a 24–8 victory to improve to 3–0 on the season. For his performance, Hurts was named NFC Offensive Player of Month for September, becoming the first Eagles player to win the award since 2017.

During Week 5 against the Arizona Cardinals, Hurts and the Eagles would use the Tush Push to successfully make five out of six first-down conversions, resulting in the play becoming the team's primary focus during short-yardage situations. After a 29–17 victory over the Houston Texans, Hurts became the first Eagles quarterback to lead the team to an 8–0 record.

In Week 12, Hurts rushed for 157 yards and threw for 153 yards and two touchdowns in a 40–33 win over the Packers, earning NFC Offensive Player of the Week. He became the first player with 150+ rushing yards, 150+ passing yards and multiple passing touchdowns in a single game. In Week 13, Hurts threw 380 pass yards and four total touchdowns (three passing, one rushing) against the Tennessee Titans, becoming the first Eagles player with at least 350 pass yards, three passing touchdowns, and a rushing touchdown in the same game.

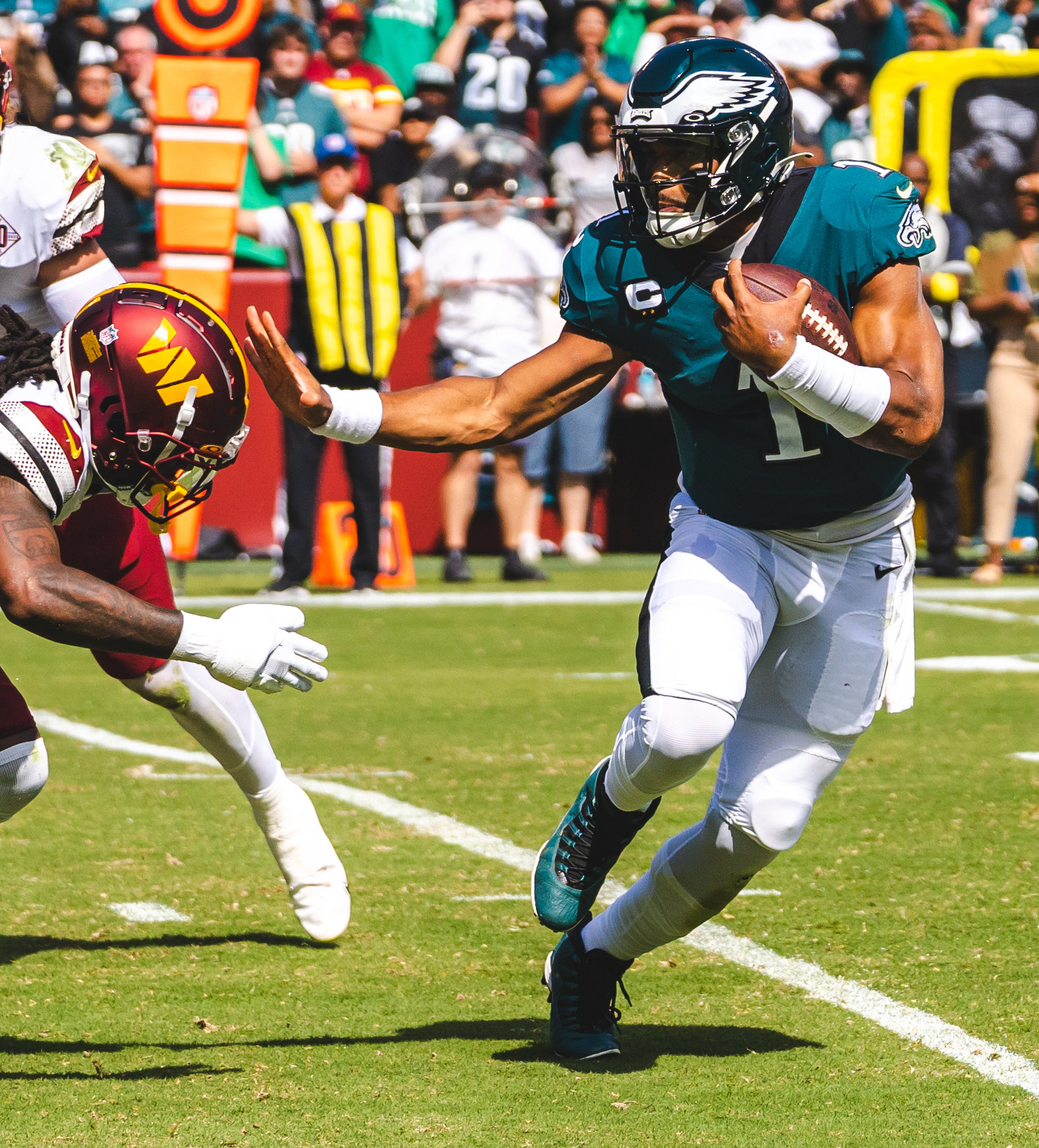
Hurts stiff arms a defender in 2022

With a Week 14 win over the Giants, Hurts led the Eagles to a consecutive playoff berth. A day after the win over the Bears, it was revealed that Hurts sprained his throwing shoulder, ruling him out for the Eagles' Week 16 game against the Cowboys. Despite his injury, Hurts would help lead the Eagles to a 22–16 victory over the Giants in Week 18.

Hurts finished the season with a starting record of 14–1, tying a franchise-best (with Randall Cunningham) 35 total touchdowns (22 passing, 13 rushing) to just six interceptions, 3,701 passing yards, and a 101.5 quarterback rating. As a result of his play in the 2022 season, Hurts was named to his first career Pro Bowl, and was a Second Team All-Pro. On January 25, 2023, Hurts was named as one of the five finalists for the NFL Most Valuable Player Award, where he would eventually finish second in voting.

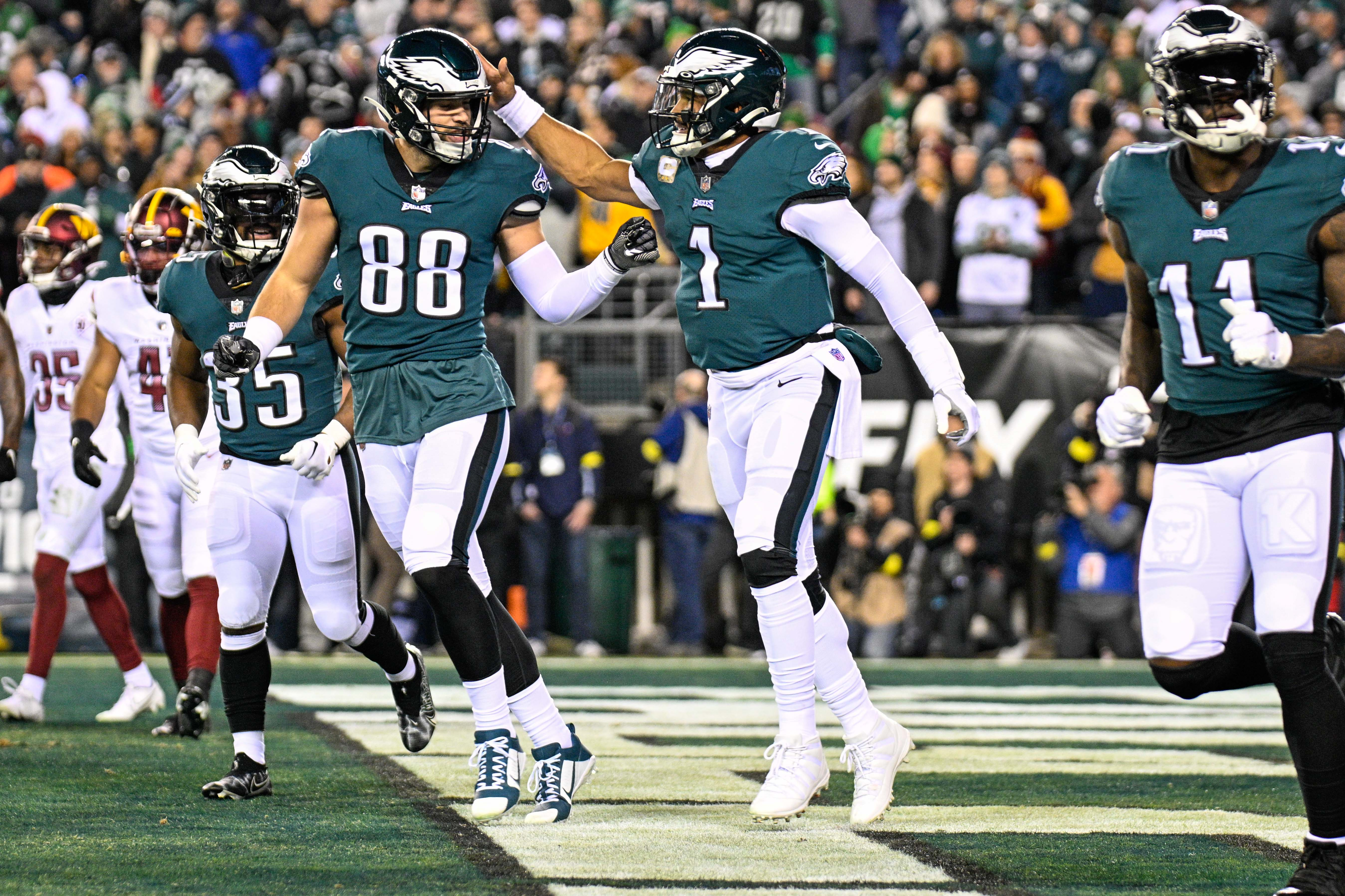
Hurts and Dallas Goedert in November 2022

On January 21, 2023, Hurts led the Eagles to a 38–7 victory over the Giants in the Divisional Round of the 2022–23 NFL playoffs. In doing so, Hurts won his first playoff game, and later led the Eagles to a 31–7 win in the NFC Championship against the 49ers to advance to Super Bowl LVII and face the Kansas City Chiefs. In the game, Hurts threw for 304 yards and a touchdown, and rushed for 70 yards and scored three rushing touchdowns, the most rushing yards and rushing touchdowns by a quarterback in Super Bowl history. His three touchdowns and a two-point conversion also tied the record for most points scored in a Super Bowl with 20. However, Hurts also lost a fumble which was returned for a touchdown by Nick Bolton in the second quarter, and attempted a Hail Mary pass on the last play of the game which fell short as the Eagles lost to the Chiefs, 38–35. He was ranked third by his fellow players on the NFL Top 100 Players of 2023.

=== 2023 season ===
On April 17, 2023, Hurts signed a five-year contract extension for $255 million ($180 million guaranteed), making him the highest paid player in NFL history, although that was surpassed just 10 days later by Lamar Jackson's contract with the Baltimore Ravens. The deal also includes a no-trade clause, the first in Eagles history.

In Week 8, Hurts threw for 319 yards and four touchdowns in a 38–31 win over the Washington Commanders, earning NFC Offensive Player of the Week. In a Week 9 game against the Cowboys, Hurts scored his 33rd career rushing touchdown, surpassing Randall Cunningham for the most by a quarterback in franchise history. In Week 12, Hurts achieved his 10th rushing touchdown for the season and finished with 265 total passing and rushing yards and five touchdowns in a 37–34 win over the Buffalo Bills. He became the first quarterback in NFL history to have three consecutive seasons with at least 10 rushing touchdowns each. In Week 16, in a game against the Giants, Hurts scored his 15th rushing touchdown of the season, breaking the record for rushing touchdowns in a single season by a quarterback, which was previously set by Cam Newton in 2011. The following week, in a game against the Cardinals, Hurts scored his 36th total touchdown of the season with a throw to wide receiver Julio Jones, breaking the franchise record held by Randall Cunningham that Hurts had tied the season prior. In Week 18, Hurts suffered a dislocated middle finger against the Giants and was taken out of the game early. The following week, the Eagles lost 32–9 in the Wild Card round of the playoffs against the Buccaneers. He earned Pro Bowl honors for the 2023 season. Hurts ultimately finished the season with career highs in passing and rushing touchdowns, but also set career highs in interceptions and fumbles lost. Hurts was ranked 15th by his fellow players on the NFL Top 100 Players of 2024.

=== 2024 season: Super Bowl MVP ===
In his season debut, Hurts led the Eagles to a 34–29 victory over the Green Bay Packers in Brazil, completing 20 of 34 passes for 278 yards, two touchdowns, and two interceptions. After a 2–2 start to the season, where Hurts accumulated six touchdowns and seven turnovers, the following the bye week, Hurts led the Eagles to a 20–16 victory over the Cleveland Browns, passing for 264 yards, two touchdowns and no turnovers. In Week 8, Hurts guided the Eagles to a commanding 37–17 road win victory over the Cincinnati Bengals, throwing for 236 yards scoring two one-yard rushing touchdowns and a passing touchdown. On November 10, Hurts accounted for four total touchdowns—two passing and two rushing—along with one interception in a 34–6 rout of the Cowboys. It marked the third time the Eagles scored over 30 points in a game and the second time they accomplished the feat against a division rival.

In Week 14 against the Carolina Panthers, Hurts accounted for three total touchdowns—two passing and one rushing, helping the Eagles clinch their fourth consecutive playoff berth in a 22–16 win. The next week, Hurts threw for 290 yards, two touchdowns, and added a rushing score in a 27–13 win over the Pittsburgh Steelers, leading the Eagles to their first franchise 10-game win streak. On December 22, Hurts suffered a concussion against the Commanders in Week 16 in the first quarter and did not return, ending their win streak in the 36–33 loss as Kenny Pickett replaced him for the remainder of the game. He remained in concussion protocol and missed the final two games of the regular season, but he was cleared in time for the Eagles' Wild Card Game against the Packers. Hurts led the Eagles to a 22–10 win over the Packers in the Wild Card round. In the Divisional Round, Hurts helped the Eagles to a 28–22 victory.

In the NFC Championship against the Commanders, Hurts tallied four touchdowns, zero turnovers, and directed the offense to a dominant 55–23 win, advancing to Super Bowl LIX. In Super Bowl LIX, Hurts threw for 221 yards with two touchdowns and an interception while also rushing for 72 yards and a touchdown in the 40–22 win against the Chiefs to avenge Philadelphia's loss two years earlier in Super Bowl LVII. He was named Super Bowl MVP for his performance, becoming the third Black quarterback to earn the honor and the fourth black starting quarterback to win a Super Bowl. He was ranked 19th by his fellow players on the NFL Top 100 Players of 2025.

=== 2025 season ===
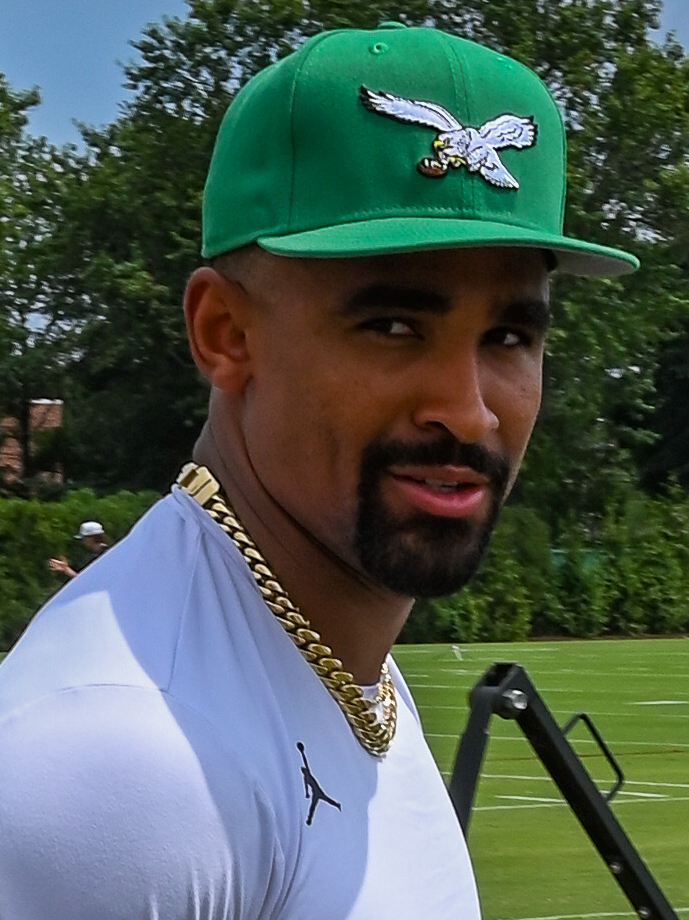
Hurts at training camp in 2025

Following their Super Bowl victory, Hurts and the Eagles made an appearance in the NFL Kickoff game, hosting the rival Dallas Cowboys. In the game, Hurts completed 19 passes out of 23 attempts for 152 yards, with no touchdowns or interceptions. He accompanied his passing performance with 14 carries for 62 yards and 2 touchdowns on the ground. Hurts led the Eagles to four consecutive wins to open their 2025 season with him recording a combined completion percentage of 79.9%, throwing for 609 yards and rushing for another 41. Hurts did not throw for a passing touchdown until Week 3's 33–26 victory over the Los Angeles Rams when he completed a 33-yard pass to tight end Dallas Goedert in the third quarter. He finished the game accounting for four touchdowns total with one rushing and three passing. After back-to-back losses to the Denver Broncos and the New York Giants, Hurts had a bounce-back performance in Week 7 against the Minnesota Vikings, where he passed for 326 yards and 3 touchdowns with passer rating of 158.3, achieving the first game with a perfect passer rating in his professional career, becoming the third Eagles quarterback to do so.

During a December 8 overtime loss against the Los Angeles Chargers, Hurts had one of the worst outings of his career, setting a career-high in turnovers in one game, fumbling the ball once and throwing four interceptions, including the game-losing interception in overtime. He also became the first player since at least 1978 to turn the ball over twice on the same play: during the second quarter, Hurts attempted a pass over the middle and was intercepted by Chargers defensive end Da'Shawn Hand; Hand was then stripped of the ball by Eagles running back Will Shipley while advancing the ball upfield; Hurts collected the fumble, then immediately lost control of the ball after a peanut punch by Chargers nose tackle Jamaree Caldwell; Chargers linebacker Troy Dye recovered the fumble for the Chargers. Hurts finished the game with 21 completions of 40 attempts for 240 yards along with those five turnovers for a career-low 31.3 passer rating and 27.3 QBR. During the 2025 season, Hurts notably had multiple games without a second half pass completion, going 0 for 8 against the Tampa Bay Buccaneers in Week 4, and 0 for 7 against the Buffalo Bills in Week 17. This statistic made the Eagles the first team since the 1987 New England Patriots to record multiple games without a second half completion. Many fans attributed it to controversial offensive coordinator Kevin Patullo, whose unpopular play-calling that season made him the blame for many of the Eagles' losses and poor performances by Hurts.

In the Wild Card Round playoff game against the San Francisco 49ers, Hurts completed 20 passes out of 35 attempts for 168 yards and one touchdown in the Eagles' 23–19 loss.

=== 2026 season ===
Hurts was struck by a cleat in the left calf during the Eagles' Week 4 loss to the Los Angeles Rams on October 4, 2026, and reported the injury to the team's medical staff on October 8. He returned to practice the next day, and the team then traveled to London for a Week 5 game against the Jacksonville Jaguars. An ultrasound on October 10 found a superficial blood clot in his calf; team doctors and London-based specialists concluded that it was safe for him to play. Hurts started the game, a 19–17 loss at Tottenham Hotspur Stadium, and attempted 40 passes. NFL Network reporter Ian Rapoport later reported that Hurts had been at a London hospital until about 4 a.m. and had been awake for 36 hours before starting the game, after being told that sleeping posed health risks related to the clot.

After the team returned to the United States, a follow-up ultrasound showed movement in the clot, and Hurts was ruled out for the Eagles' game against the Carolina Panthers. On October 17, 2026, he was placed on injured reserve, which required him to miss at least four games. Tanner McKee started in his place.

On October 19, a joint statement from the Eagles and Hurts' agent, Nicole Lynn, said that further testing had found a deep vein thrombosis and bilateral pulmonary emboli; the clots in his lungs had traveled from his legs. The statement described Hurts as "clinically stable" with "no significant functional limitations", said his treatment should involve only anticoagulants, and barred him from contact activities, including football, while on them. It added that "Jalen's prognosis is very good, and we expect a full recovery." Rapoport and Adam Schefter reported that Hurts was expected to miss the remainder of the season, with recovery expected to take about three months. According to sources cited by ESPN, the clot was "provoked", meaning it followed the calf injury, which carries a favorable prognosis with treatment.

== Career statistics ==
Legend
	Super Bowl MVP
	Won the Super Bowl
	NFL record
	Led the league
**Bold**	Career high

=== NFL ===
==== Regular season ====
**General**					**Passing**									**Rushing**					**Sacks**		**Fumbles**	
**Year**	**Team**	**GP**	**GS**	**Record**	**Cmp**	**Att**	**Pct**	**Yds**	**Avg**	**Lng**	**TD**	**Int**	**Rtg**	**Att**	**Yds**	**Avg**	**Lng**	**TD**	**Sck**	**SckY**	**Fum**	**Lost**
2020	PHI	15	4	1–3	77	148	52.0	1,061	7.2	81	6	4	77.6	63	354	**5.6**	24	3	13	59	**9**	2
2021	PHI	15	15	8–7	265	432	61.3	3,144	7.3	**91**	16	9	87.2	139	**784**	**5.6**	31	10	26	150	**9**	2
2022	PHI	15	15	**14–1**	306	460	66.5	3,701	**8.0**	68	22	6	101.5	**165**	760	4.6	**42**	13	**38**	231	**9**	2
2023	PHI	17	17	11–6	**352**	**538**	65.4	**3,858**	7.2	63	23	**15**	89.1	157	605	3.9	24	**15**	36	222	**9**	**5**
2024	PHI	15	15	12–3	248	361	**68.7**	2,903	**8.0**	67	18	5	**103.7**	150	630	4.2	35	14	**38**	**271**	**9**	**5**
2025	PHI	16	16	11–5	294	454	64.8	3,224	7.1	79	**25**	6	98.5	105	421	4.0	29	8	32	181	8	4
2026	PHI	5	5	2–3	89	154	57.8	933	6.1	64	8	3	84.7	23	107	4.7	22	1	13	90	3	0
Career		98	87	59–28	1,631	2,547	64.0	18,824	7.4	91	118	48	93.8	802	3,661	4.6	42	64	196	1,194	56	20

==== Postseason ====
**General**					**Passing**									**Rushing**					**Sacks**		**Fumbles**	
**Year**	**Team**	**GP**	**GS**	**Record**	**Cmp**	**Att**	**Pct**	**Yds**	**Avg**	**Lng**	**TD**	**Int**	**Rtg**	**Att**	**Yds**	**Avg**	**Lng**	**TD**	**Sck**	**SckY**	**Fum**	**Lost**
2021	PHI	1	1	0–1	23	43	53.5	258	6.0	35	1	**2**	60.0	8	39	4.9	11	0	2	14	1	0
2022	PHI	3	3	2–1	58	87	66.7	579	6.7	45	3	0	96.9	**35**	143	4.1	28	**5**	4	8	**2**	**1**
2023	PHI	1	1	0–1	25	35	**71.4**	250	7.1	**55**	1	0	100.9	1	5	5.0	5	0	3	16	0	0
2024	PHI	4	4	**4–0**	**65**	**91**	**71.4**	**726**	**8.0**	46	**5**	1	**108.6**	34	**194**	**5.7**	**44**	**5**	**13**	**100**	1	0
2025	PHI	1	1	0–1	20	35	57.1	168	4.8	20	1	0	79.2	5	14	2.8	4	0	1	1	0	0
Career		10	10	6–4	191	291	65.6	1,981	6.8	55	11	3	93.5	83	395	4.8	44	10	23	139	4	1

==== Super Bowl ====
Year	SB	Team	Opp.	Passing								Rushing				Result
Year	SB	Team	Opp.	Cmp	Att	Pct	Yds	Y/A	TD	Int	Rtg	Att	Yds	Y/A	TD	Result
2022	LVII	PHI	KC	**27**	**38**	71.1	**304**	8.0	1	0	103.4	**15**	70	4.7	**3**	L 38–35
2024	LIX	PHI	KC	17	22	**77.3**	221	**10.1**	**2**	1	**119.7**	11	**72**	**6.6**	1	**W** 40–22
Career				44	60	73.3	525	8.8	3	1	109.4	26	142	5.5	4	W−L 1–1

=== College ===
Season	Team	Games			Passing								Rushing			
Season	Team	GP	GS	Record	Comp	Att	Pct	Yards	Avg	TD	Int	Rate	Att	Yards	Avg	TD
2016	Alabama	15	14	**13–1**	**240**	**382**	62.8	2,780	7.3	23	**9**	139.1	191	954	5.0	13
2017	Alabama	14	14	**13–1**	154	255	60.4	2,081	8.2	17	1	150.2	154	855	**5.6**	8
2018	Alabama	13	0	0–0	51	70	**72.9**	765	10.9	8	2	**196.7**	36	167	4.6	2
2019	Oklahoma	14	14	12–2	237	340	69.7	**3,851**	**11.3**	**32**	8	191.2	**233**	**1,298**	**5.6**	**20**
Career		56	42	38–4	682	1,047	65.1	9,477	9.1	80	20	162.6	614	3,274	5.3	43

== Career highlights ==
=== Awards and honors ===
NFL

- Super Bowl champion (LIX)
- Super Bowl MVP (LIX)
- Second-team All-Pro (2022)
- 3× Pro Bowl (2022, 2023, 2025)
- Bert Bell Award (2022)

College

- CFP national champion (2017)
- Third-team All-American (2019)
- Big 12 Offensive Newcomer of the Year (2019)
- First-team All-Big 12 (2019)
- First-team All-SEC (2016)
- SEC Offensive Player of the Year (2016)
- SEC Freshman of the Year (2016)

=== Records ===
NFL records

- Most rushing touchdowns by a quarterback in a single season: 15 (2023, tied with Josh Allen)
- Most rushing touchdowns in a postseason game by a quarterback: 3
- Most rushing yards in a Super Bowl by a quarterback: 72
- Most points scored in a Super Bowl by a single player: 20 (tied with James White)

== Personal life ==
Hurts's parents are Pamela and Averion Hurts. Hurts has two siblings: a younger sister, Kynnedy, and an older brother, Averion, named after their father. Averion was the starting quarterback for Texas Southern University. As of Hurts's freshman year, one of his parents attended his football game every week, while the other attended Averion's game. On June 14, 2025, Hurts married Bryonna "Bry" Rivera Burrows, his college sweetheart.

Hurts is a Baptist. He has said, "I keep God at the center of everything. I give Him all the praise, I lean on Him all the time. And I know that everything unfolds the way it’s supposed to."

On June 20, 2022, Hurts filed for a trademark for the phrase "HURTS SO GOOD." The trademark registry says that it will be used for a clothing line that includes "men's, women's and children's clothing, namely shirts, jackets, sweatshirts, pants, shorts, vests, gloves, socks, sweaters, underwear, skirts, hats and belts."

Hurts is an advocate for women in sports and employs an all-female management team, including his social media, marketing, communications, and sports agent team members. In 2021, Hurts honored female empowerment and women in sports when participating in the NFL's "My Cause, My Cleats" initiative. In 2023, the management team reached out to the producers of Abbott Elementary to express Hurts interest in making an appearance as 'he was a big fan' and Hurts and his teammates, Jason Kelce and Brandon Graham had their cameos during the one-hour season three premiere of the show.

In 2022, Hurts provided vocals on the Christmas album A Philly Special Christmas.

In 2025, Hurts was selected to the Time 100, a list of the 100 most influential people in the world.

Hurts is the godfather to the daughter of his former NFL teammate A. J. Brown.
