= Stanford Lyman =

American sociologist (1933–2003)

- Born: Stanford Morris Lyman; June 10, 1933; San Francisco, California
- Died: March 9, 2003 (aged 69)
- Education: University of California at Berkeley
- Known for: Interactionism
- Scientific career
- Fields: Sociology
- Workplaces: New School for Social Research; Florida Atlantic University
- Thesis: The Structure of Chinese Society in Nineteenth-Century America (1961)
- Doctoral advisors: Kingsley Davis; Franz Schurmann; Edward A.N. Barnhart

Stanford Morris Lyman (June 10, 1933 – March 9, 2003) was an American sociologist. He is recognized for his work on interactionism and the sociology of race relations in the United States. He served as president of the Mid-South Sociological Association, and he co-founded the American Sociological Association's Section on Asian/Asian American sociology. He was also a founder of the International Journal of Politics, Culture, and Society. He died of liver cancer on March 9, 2003.
