= Mid-South Sociological Association =

Sociological organization

The Mid-South Sociological Association (MSSA) is a non-profit professional organization of sociologists and social scientists established in 1976.

== History ==
Its first president was Julian B. Roebuck, professor of sociology at Mississippi State University. The MSSA holds annual meetings in late October in locations around the Mid-South region.

== Background ==
At its annual meeting, the MSSA holds sessions for presentations of professional papers, discussions, and speakers. The organization also has a banquet, at which the current president gives a talk and officers give out awards. This includes the Stanford M. Lyman Memorial Scholarship, given each year to a worthy doctoral student completing a dissertation; the Sociological Spectrum Outstanding Article Award, given to the best article published that year in the journal Sociological Spectrum; and the Stanford M. Lyman Distinguished Book Award, given to an outstanding book authored by a member of the organization in the previous three years. Notable past presidents include Carl L. Bankston, Dennis L. Peck, and Clifton D. Bryant.

== Publications ==
Sociological Spectrum
- Language: English
- Edited by: Kevin D. Breault

Publication details
- History: 1980–present
- Publisher: Taylor and Francis (United States)
- Frequency: Bi-monthly

Standard abbreviations
- ISO 4: Sociol. Spectr.

Indexing
- ISSN: 0273-2173 (print); 1521-0707 (web)
- LCCN: 81649975
- OCLC no.: 321020947

Links
- Journal homepage; Online access; Online archive

The main publication of the MSSA is its official journal Sociological Spectrum, a interdisciplinary social science journal that publishes articles in the areas of sociology, social psychology, anthropology, and political science. It was established in 1980 and is published six times every year by Taylor and Francis. As of June 2022 the editor-in-chief is Kevin Breault.

According to the Journal Citation Reports, the journal has a 2021 impact factor of 1.127, ranking it 115th out of 148 journals in the category "Sociology".
