= Kevin D. Breault =

American sociologist

- Education: Reed College; University of Washington; University of Chicago
- Scientific career
- Fields: Sociology
- Workplaces: University of Cincinnati; Washington University in St. Louis; University of Illinois Chicago; Austin Peay State University; Middle Tennessee State University

Kevin D. Breault is an American sociologist and Professor of Sociology at Middle Tennessee State University, who researches in the areas of social epidemiology, suicide, homicide, religion in America, and Émile Durkheim. He is Editor-in-Chief of Sociological Spectrum.

== Biography ==
Breault earned his B.A. degree from Reed College, his M.A. from the University of Washington, and his Ph.D. degree at the University of Chicago in 1986.

Breault began his academic teaching career at the University of Cincinnati as an assistant professor of sociology (1985–1987), Fellow at the Center for Advanced Study in the Behavior Sciences, Stanford University (1987), and Ogburn-Stouffer Fellow at the University of Chicago (1987–1988). He was then appointed assistant professor of Sociology and Psychiatry in the Arts and Sciences at Washington University in St. Louis (1988–1991). After, he worked as a visiting assistant professor of sociology at University of Illinois at Chicago, assistant professor of Sociology at Austin Peay State University (1992–1994), Associate Professor of Sociology at Austin Peay (1994–1998), and was Sociology chair at Austin Peay State University (1997–1998). He was appointed associate professor of sociology at Middle Tennessee State University in 1999, and promoted in 2001 to Professor.

He served as Co-Editor-in-Chief of Sociological Spectrum (2011–2013), and since 2014 serves as the journal's Editor-in-Chief. He has served as President of the Mid-South Sociological Association (2016–2017).

He has independently published a young adult novel entitled With Wings to Fly, Bloomington, IN, 1st Books, 1999, and is a noted birder with a top 5 ranking in the American Birding Association on the "Total Ticks" list.

== Work ==
Breault has 48 publications in the general areas of medical-social epidemiology, crime, and quantitative methodology on such topics as depression and military service, diabetes, history of the Mid-South Sociological Association, immigration, drug use, property crime, religious diversity in America, divorce, psychophysical measurement, and the measurement of marginal utility.

Breault's research has focused on helping to establish the legitimacy of empirical research on Durkheim's theory of suicide, and moving the literature beyond the study of small sample ecological units of analysis to individual level longitudinal study where he has published on depression in the military, diabetes and suicide, now commonly thought of as Social Epidemiology.

== Selected publications ==
- 1995: "Reassessing the Structural Covariates of Violent and Property Crime: A County Level Study," (with A. J. Kposowa & B. Harrison), British Journal of Sociology, 46, 79–105. According to Google Scholar, this article has been cited 221 times.
- 1995: "White Male Suicide in the United States: A Multivariate Individual Level Analysis," (with A.J. Kposowa and G. Singh), Social Forces, 1995, 74, 315–325. According to google Scholar, this article has been cited 106 times.
- 1993: "Reassessing the Structural Covariates of U.S. Homicide Rates: A County Level Study," (with A.J. Kposowa) Sociological Focus, 1993, 26, 27–46. According to Google Scholar, this article has been cited 87 times.
- 1989: “New Evidence on Religious Pluralism, Urbanism and Religious Participation,” American Sociological Review, 1989, 54, 1048–53. According to Google Scholar, this article has been cited 187 times.
- 1987: “Explaining Divorce in the United States,” (with A.J. Kposowa), Journal of Marriage and the Family, 1987, 49, 549–58. According to Google Scholar, this article has been cited 105 times.
- 1986: "Suicide in America: A Test of Durkheim’s Theory of Religious and Family Integration, 1933-1980,” American Journal of Sociology, 628–56. According to Google Scholar, it has been cited 302 times.
- 1982: “A Comparative Analysis of Durkheim’s Theory of Egoistic Suicide” (with K. Barkey), Sociological Quarterly, 1982, 23, 321–31. According to Google Scholar, this article has been cited 101 times.
