= San Jacinto College =

Community college in Pasadena, Texas

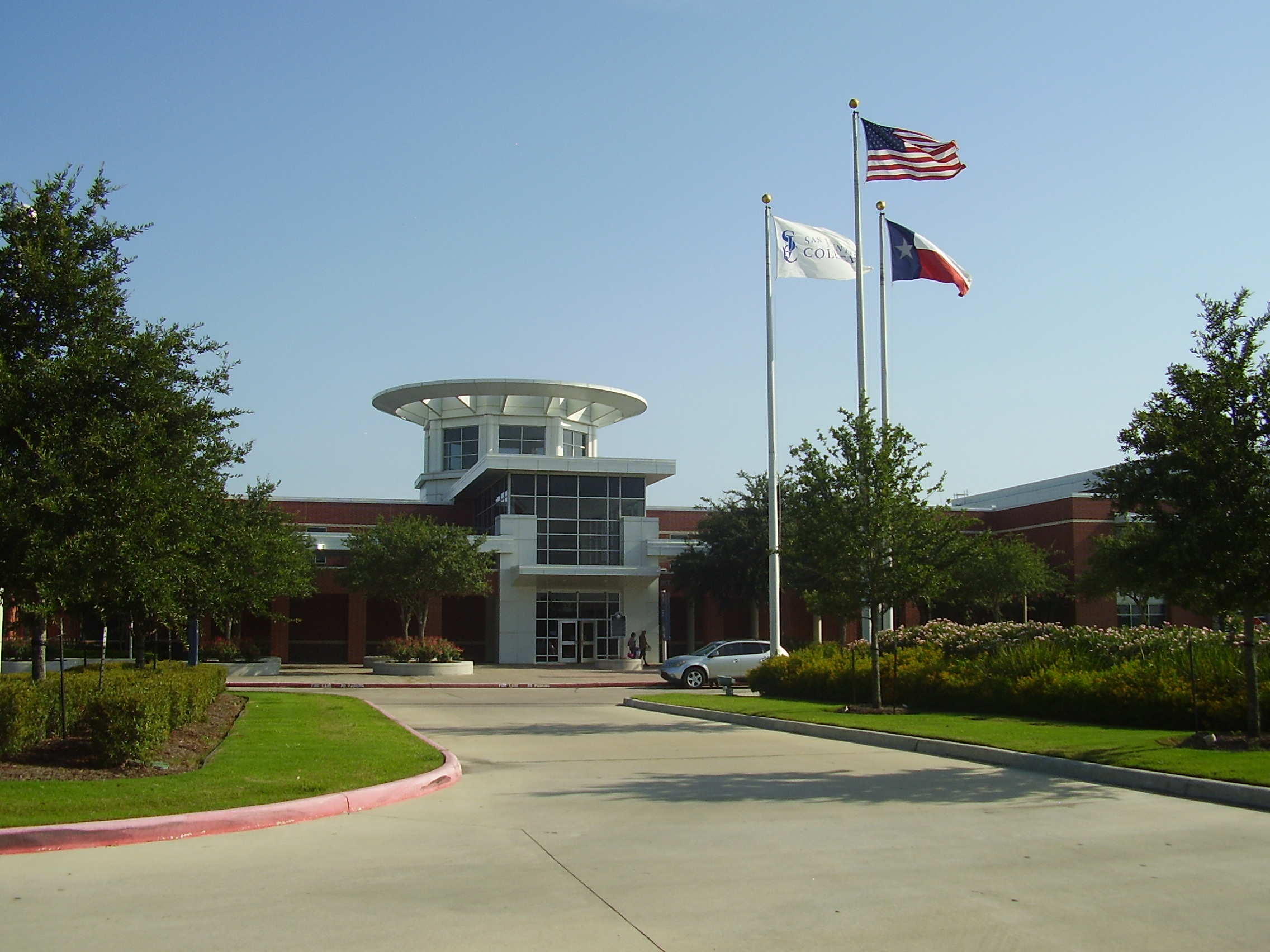
- Front view of central campus.
- Motto: Your Goals. Your College.
- Type: Public community college
- Established: 1961
- Chancellor: Brenda Hellyer
- Students: 30,000
- Location: Pasadena, La Porte, and Houston, Texas, U.S.
- Campus: Urban
- Colors: Blue and gold
- Nickname: Ravens
- Website: www.sanjac.edu

San Jacinto College (Spanish: Colegio San Jacinto) is a public community college in the Greater Houston area, with its campuses in Pasadena and Houston, Texas. Established in 1961, San Jacinto College originally consisted of the independent school districts (ISD) of Channelview, Deer Park, Galena Park, La Porte, and Pasadena.

The college now also serves Sheldon ISD and portions of Clear Creek ISD in Harris County. San Jacinto College headquarters are located in Pasadena, Texas.

== History ==
In May 1960, voters in the Channelview, Deer Park, Galena Park, La Porte, and Pasadena school districts approved the creation of East Harris County Union Junior College, elected seven members to serve on the Board of Regents and authorized the Board of Regents (now Board of Trustees) to levy a tax for the college operations and maintenance.

On February 16, 1961, the Board of Regents changed the name of the district to The San Jacinto Junior College District. Using renovated buildings in Pasadena, the college welcomed 876 students to its first classes in September 1961. The San Jacinto Junior College District was approved and accredited by the Texas Department of Education when the college opened. The college was granted full membership in the Association of Texas Colleges and Universities on April 6, 1963. On November 4, 1968, Sheldon Independent School District was voted part of the college district.

On November 30, 1966, the Southern Association of Colleges and Schools first granted San Jacinto college accreditation. The north and south campuses were first accredited in 1976 and 1979, respectively. The most recent reaffirmation of accreditation for all three campuses occurred in 2019.

Bonds issued in 1972 included funds for the North Campus. Following five terms of extension classes offered at North Shore High School, the North Campus opened for classes on its site in the fall of 1975. In 1976, bonds were approved for a third campus. After several terms of extension classes offered at J. Frank Dobie High School, San Jacinto College South opened for classes in September 1979.

In 1997, James F. Horton became the chancellor, and Adena Williams Loston became the second president of San Jacinto College South and the first African-American president in the district.

In December 1999 voters approved the issuing of $91 million in general obligation bonds, allowing the construction of six new buildings including the Interactive Learning Centers and Fine Arts Centers. Another vote in May 2008 earmarked $295 million to create updated science facilities, allied health facilities, library improvements, and physical education facility improvements.

Clear Horizons Early College High School opened its doors on the south campus in the fall of 2007. A partnership with Clear Creek ISD, this program allows students to earn an associate degree while simultaneously earning a high school diploma. In 2008, Hurricane Ike inflicted significant damage to the three campuses. Students were back in class in less than three weeks.

== Campuses ==
The stairs in the Library in the Central campus

The college has five main campuses and four extension centers:

- The Central campus, located mostly in Pasadena (also with a Pasadena postal address), and partially in La Porte;
- The North campus, in unincorporated Harris County, with a Houston postal address, on Uvalde Road near the intersection of Wallisville Road, which opened in 1975;
- The South campus, located in the Houston city limits, on Beamer Road near the intersection of FM 1959, which opened in 1979;
- The Maritime campus, in Pasadena, with a La Porte postal address, at the Port of Houston, which opened in 2016; and
- The Generation Park campus, located in unincorporated northeast Harris County, Houston address, which opened on August 1, 2020, and primarily serves students from the Sheldon and Humble communities who want to transfer to a four-year university.

There are four extension centers, including the EDGE Center near the Johnson Space Center in Houston and three Small Business Development Centers in Deer Park, Houston and Pearland.

== Organization and administration ==
Established in 1961, the district originally consisted of the areas of Channelview ISD, Deer Park ISD, Galena Park ISD, La Porte ISD, and Pasadena ISD. The district now also serves Sheldon ISD. As defined by the Texas Legislature, the official service area of San Jacinto College includes territory within the following school districts: the Channelview Independent School District, the Deer Park Independent School District, the Galena Park Independent School District, the La Porte Independent School District, the Pasadena Independent School District, the Sheldon Independent School District and the portion of Clear Creek Independent School District located in Harris County. Some facilities are also located within the boundaries of Clear Creek ISD but Clear Creek ISD is not considered In-District for enrollment purposes.

== Academics ==
San Jacinto College offers students an opportunity to complete classes in Basic, Intermediate, and Paramedic level emergency medical technology. The college also offers maritime trade and logistics education programs. The most recent results published in Texas EMS Magazine indicate a 41% first attempt pass rate for Paramedic program graduates from December 1, 2008, to November 30, 2009.

In 2020, San Jacinto College was awarded the Excellence and Equity in Community College STEM Award by the Aspen Institute and Siemens Foundation.

== Student life ==
=== Sport ===
Each campus has its own team for athletics. Initially, the San Jacinto Central Ravens represented Pasadena, whilst the San Jacinto North Gators and San Jacinto South Coyotes represented Houston. The decision was made in the 2022–2023 school year to merge all campuses into one mascot, the Raven.

== Notable alumni ==
- Anthony Banda, professional baseball player
- Brandon Belt, professional baseball player
- Walter Berry, professional basketball player
- Jeff Bourns, tennis professional
- Briscoe Cain, lawyer and politician from Texas
- Francisco Calvo, Costa Rican international footballer
- Sam Cassell, professional basketball player and coach
- Roger Clemens, professional baseball player
- Chad Deering, professional soccer player
- Karith Foster, comedian and national radio personality
- Steve Francis, professional basketball player
- Merlene Frazer, Olympic sprinter
- Rick Hearst, actor and winner of Daytime Emmy Awards
- Karlene Haughton, Olympic sprinter
- Thomas Henderson, professional basketball player
- Dean Hughes, professional basketball player
- Zach Lofton, professional basketball player
- Sean Nolin, professional baseball player
- Mitchell Parker, professional baseball player
- Andy Pettitte, professional baseball player
- Sandie Richards, Jamaican sprinter (2 Olympic medals, 12 World Championship medals including 4 gold)
- Marcus Session, professional basketball player
- Devin Smeltzer, professional baseball player
- Omar Sneed, professional basketball player
- Patrick Swayze, actor
- Ray Williams, professional basketball player
