= Dennis L. Peck =

Dennis L. Peck (born 1942) is an American sociologist and emeritus Professor of Sociology at the University of Alabama, best known for his research on suicide, single-vehicle car accidents, and learning to cope with the last moments of life.

== Biography ==
Dennis Peck is an emeritus Professor of Sociology at The University of Alabama. He earned the MS degree in sociology at the University of Wisconsin–Milwaukee and, in 1976, he earned the Ph.D. degree at Washington State University.

After his service in the United States Air Force during the mid-1960s and the U.S. Public Health in the early 1970s. Peck began his academic career at East Texas State University in Commerce, Texas. Two years later he was appointed to a position in the Department of Sociology at The University of Alabama in 1978., where he served as Assistant Professor (1978–1982, Associate Professor (1982–1986), and as Professor of Sociology from 1986 until 2008.

During his tenure at the University of Alabama Peck went on leave to serve in Washington, D.C. as a Program evaluation researcher for the federal government at the Department of Housing and Urban Development and later the Department of Education.

From 1987 to 1993 he served as editor of the Sociological Inquiry, and was president of the Mid-South Sociological Society and the Alabama-Mississippi Sociological Association.

== Work ==
In addition to his interdisciplinary contributions in the general areas of demography, the sociology of law, deviant behavior, criminology, and death and dying, he has authored and edited books, chapters, and journal articles in the areas of suicide, public health, psychiatric law, democracy, toxic waste disposal, life without parole, human sexuality, urban development programming, post-traumatic stress disorder, program evaluation, divorce, social policy, and civility.

Contributing to the learned literature throughout his career, Peck served as lead co-editor-in-chief of The Encyclopedia of Death and the Human Experience (2009) and 21st Century Sociology: A Reference Handbook (2007).

== Selected publications ==
- Peck, Dennis L., and J. Selwyn Hollingsworth eds. Demographic and Structural Change: The Effects of the 1980s on American Society. No. 114. Greenwood Publishing Group, 1996.
- Bryant, Clifton D., and Dennis L. Peck, eds. 21st century sociology: a reference handbook. Sage Publications, 2006.
- Bryant, Clifton D., and Dennis L. Peck, eds. Encyclopedia of death and the human experience. Sage Publications, 2009.

Articles, a selection:

- Peck, Dennis L (1983). "The last moments of life: Learning to cope". Deviant Behavior. 4 (3–4): 313–332. doi:10.1080/01639625.1983.9967620.
- Peck, Dennis L (1986). "Completed suicides: Correlates of choice of method". OMEGA: Journal of Death and Dying. 16 (4): 309–323. doi:10.2190/40va-4107-0bjr-vf9h.
- Peck, Dennis L.; Warner, Kenneth (1995). "Accident or suicide? Single-vehicle car accidents and the intent hypothesis". Adolescence. 30 (118): 463.
