= Channelview Independent School District =

School district in Texas, United States

Address
- 828 Sheldon Road Channelview, Texas, 77530; USA (United States)

District information
- Type: Public
- Motto: Empowered to Thrive
- Grades: PreK - 12
- Established: 1937; 88 years ago
- Superintendent: Dr. Tory C. Hill
- Schools: 12
- NCES District ID: 4813590

Students and staff
- Students: 9,434 (2023–2024)
- Teachers: 592.60 (on an FTE basis) (2023–2024)
- Staff: 875.59 (on an FTE basis) (2023–2024)
- Student–teacher ratio: 15.92 (2023–2024)
- Athletic conference: 6A

Channelview Independent School District is a school district in Channelview, a census-designated place in an unincorporated area of Harris County, Texas, United States. As of 2022, CISD's superintendent is Dr. Tory C. Hill.

In 2010, the school district is rated "recognized" by the Texas Education Agency.

== History ==
The district was established in 1937.

In the 2007–08 school year, Channelview ISD combined the Primary and Elementary schools into K–5 schools and Cobb Elementary took all 6th Grade students in the district. In the spring of 2008, CISD also opened the new Kolarik Freshman campus, right next to the current high school. Formerly, Channelview ISD operated on a K–3, 4–6, 7–8, 9–12 grade level split.

On May 4, 2019, Channelview ISD voters approved a $195.4 million bond package – the district's first in 10 years. This bond combined Cobb and Schochler Elementary into a completely new campus named McGhee Elementary while also rebuilding a brand new De Zavala Elementary. At the high school it added a new Career & Technical Education Center, Performing Arts Center and other renovations and additions to Athletics. Throughout the district it covered renovations to campus' HVAC, Plumbing, Electrical Systems, Driveways and other Interior Finishes while also contributing to the district as a whole with Security systems, Technology, Buses and Land Purchases.

McGhee Elementary was officially opened at the start of the 2022–23 school year, De Zavala opened soon after for the 2024–25 school year.

As of the 2024–25 school year, Channelview ISD has one prekindergarten campus, six elementary campuses, two junior high schools, one DAEP center, and two high schools(one being a "high school of choice.")

Current Campus Information
Campus	Naming History
Barrett-Lee Early Childhood Center	Barrett-Lee Early Childhood center is named after Mr. Roy Glenn Barrett and Mrs. Judy Lee. Mr. Barrett served for Channelview ISD from 1960 to 1993. He started his career as a teacher, to later be promoted to assistant principal at De Zavala Elementary. In 1979 he became principal at McMullan Elementary and later retired in 1993. Mrs. Lee's career with Channelview ISD spanned from 1974 to 2017. She started as a home economics teacher, later adding pregnancy education and parenting to her classes from 1990 to 1993. She was promoted to assistant principal at Endeavor High School from 1993 to 1997, when she advanced to Principal, in 1999 the daycare was added to her duties. In 2004 she continued as principal to the prekindergarten, daycare and Even Start. She continued to lead the prekindergarten, working in her namesake since its opening up to her retirement in 2017.
Harvey Brown Elementary	Brown Elementary is named after Mr. Harvey S. Brown. Mr. Brown served for Channelview ISD from 1961 to 2002. He began his profession as a teacher, later being promoted to assistant principal. He became principal at De Zavala prior to transferring in 1974 to McMullan Elementary as their principal for 99 days and then advancing to assistant superintendent in 1975. He continued to serve for Channelview ISD until 2002 when he was promoted to interim superintendent in April and decided to retire in December of the same year.
Crenshaw Elementary	Crenshaw Elementary is named after Ms. Margery E. Crenshaw. Ms. Crenshaw started her career at Channelview ISD in 1950. She served as a 3rd grade teacher at De Zavala Elementary School up to her retirement in 1981.
De Zavala Elementary	De Zavala Elementary School is named after Lorenzo de Zavala, a founding father of the Republic of Texas who was once a resident of the area. The previous building's cornerstone was dated 1967 before its demolishment.
B. H. Hamblen Elementary	Hamblen Elementary is named after Mr. B. H. Hamblen. Mr. Hamblen served for Channelview ISD from 1957 to 1992. His vocation in education started in 1957 when he worked as a Coach and a Teacher. He was later promoted to principal at De Zavala in 1962. In 1967 he became CISD's Director of Special Services, later advancing to assistant superintendent in 1969. From 1974 to 1992 he served as the superintendent for Channelview ISD up to his retirement. He also later became a Consultant for the Cobb Elementary Construction.
McGhee Elementary	McGhee Elementary School is named after Mr. Joe McGhee. Mr. McGhee, whose father, Peter McGhee, had been a slave of Gen. Sam Houston, donated land for Channelview's first colored schoolhouse. The original McGhee school was located on a 100-square-foot lot near Interstate 10 and Market Street near what is now River Road. It was erected after the state offered to build and staff it in 1916. It thrived as part of District 18 until its closure in 1942 when its district was consolidated with Channelview ISD.
McMullan Elementary	McMullan Elementary School is named after Mr. Mac F. McMullan. He first started his teaching career at Sulphur Springs High School near Dallas before relocating to Channelview ISD. His service to Channelview started in 1938 at Channelview High School. He served as the CHS band director until his retirement in September 1970.
Alice Johnson Junior High	Alice Johnson Junior High School is named after a long-time Channelview ISD Custodian. Ms. Alice Johnson was a dedicated and beloved custodian who worked at David Crockett Junior High in Channelview ISD before the 1977 Bond approved the construction of Alice Johnson Junior High which received national news coverage. After the opening of her namesake in the fall of 1978 Ms. Johnson continued her career at this new campus before making the decision to retire from her over-17-year service in 1980.
Anthony Aguirre Junior High	LCPL Anthony Aguirre Junior High School is named after Marine Lance Cpl. Anthony Aguirre. Lance Corporal Aguirre died February 26, 2007, while serving during Operation Iraqi Freedom at the age of 20. He dreamed of becoming a Marine from a young age and joined the CHS JROTC before graduating in 2004. One year after graduating from Channelview High School he joined the United States Marine Corps. and was assigned to 2nd Battalion, 3rd Marine Regiment, 3rd Marine Division, III Marine Expeditionary Force, in Kaneohe Bay, Hawaii.
Joe Frank Campbell High School	Joe Frank Campbell served as a board member for CISD.
Channelview High School	The first Channelview High School was created after Mr. Carroll Schochler became CISD's superintendent in 1956. It became accredited in 1958 having its first Channelview High School graduating class of 40 students.

== Schools ==
=== High schools ===
6A

- Channelview High School
- Endeavor High School

=== Middle schools ===
- Alice Johnson Junior High School
- Lance Cpl. Anthony Aguirre Junior High
- ACT Academy - DAEP

=== K–5 Schools ===
- Crenshaw Elementary School
- De Zavala Elementary School
- Hamblen Elementary School
- Harvey Brown Elementary School
- McGhee Elementary School
- McMullan Elementary School

=== Pre-Kindergarten Schools ===
- Barrett-Lee Early Childhood Center
