= Galena Park ISD Stadium =

Stadium in Texas, United States

Coordinates: 29.808267°N 95.17635°W

- The King Pin
- Interactive map of Galena Park ISD Stadium
- Location: 15025 Wallisville Road Houston, Texas, 77049
- Capacity: 10,300
- Surface: astro turf

Construction
- Opened: November 2002
- Cost: $20,872,788 (entire sports complex)
- Architect: SHW Group Architects

Tenants
- North Shore Senior High School (UIL); Galena Park High School (UIL)

Galena Park ISD Stadium is a stadium situated on Galena Park ISD Sports Complex property in the Cloverleaf CDP of unincorporated Harris County, Texas, United States. The Galena Park Independent School District property is primarily used for American football and soccer, and is the home field of North Shore Senior High School, and Galena Park High School. It hosted the college football all-star game North-South All-Star Classic in 2007. The stadium holds 10,300 people and was opened in 2002.

== Renovations ==
For the 2020, season, the football field's turf design changed. Previously, it had a blue emblem in the middle, with Texas in the middle. The end zones were white text saying "NORTH SHORE" and "GALENA PARK" and also housed the helmets of the respective teams.
