= Fireboats in Houston =

The City of Houston and the Houston Port Authority have operated seven fireboats in Houston. The Port authority currently manages three fireboats in Houston.

The Port Houston, completed in 1926, was the first fireboat in Houston. She was retired, in 1950, when she was replaced by the Captain Crotty.

In 1971 the Texas legislature added new responsibilities to the Port Authority, which acquired an additional vessel, in 1973, the Captain W.L Farnsworth. In 1983 the Captain Crotty was retired when she was replaced by the J.S. Bracewell and the Howard T. Tellepsen.

The three most recent vessels were built by Metalcraft Marine, of Kingston, Ontario, and delivered in 2013 and 2014. They replaced three older, slower, and less capable vessels, commissioned in 1973 and 1983.

The new vessels are 70 feet (21 m) long, have a top speed of 45 knots (83 km/h). They can each project 14,000 US gallons (53,000 L) of water per minute, more than all three vessels of the previous fleet, put together.

The vessels are powered by four diesel engines each producing 1,138 shaft horsepower (849 kW), and have a draft of just 34 inches (0.86 m). They have a sophisticated suite of sensors, which can detect the heat signatures of fires, and also for search and rescue, when searching for people who are drifting in the water. Their sensors can see through fog, or in the dark, and will be useful in the vessel's secondary role - countering chemical disasters or attacks. They vessels have berths, for sleeping, for extended missions, and an infirmary, for injured rescue victims. Their internal cabins are pressurized, useful when the vessels are enveloped in heavy smoke, or when countering chemical, biological or radiological attacks.

The vessels built in 1983, the Captain W.L. Farnsworth, the J.S. Bracewell and the Howard T. Tellepsen were named after officials who worked for the Houston Port Authority, while the new vessels are known simply as Fireboat 1, Fireboat 2, Fireboat 3.
