= Fidelity Manor High School =

African-American high school in Texas

Coordinates: 29.7443°N 95.2515°W

Fidelity Manor High School was a high school for African American children in Galena Park, Texas and a part of the Galena Park Independent School District (GPISD).

It opened in 1955 and was the only black high school in the district. As part of desegregation in the United States the school merged into the previously all-white Galena Park High School in 1969. The district also closed Fidelity Elementary School at that time.

== History ==
The history of Fidelity Manor High School predates its 1955 opening as rudimentary records indicate that within the Harris County Common School District, Clinton Colored School existed in District 16 of what was then the city of Clinton, Texas as early as 1886. Clinton renamed itself Galena Park in 1936 when a petition submitted to the federal government for a post office revealed that the name Clinton already existed in the state. From 1886 until about 1922, there were at least two other schools designated for African-American children besides Clinton Colored School: Greens Bayou and Penn City. By 1916, District 16's Colored Schools saw the teaching of black children shared between Gladys Washington, Edna Griffin and long-term educator Mrs. Edna Hubbard. Mrs. Hubbard's husband, O. L. Hubbard, went on to found the first school in Independence Heights, Houston, an incorporated community proposed for the settlement of blacks. Rosa Young Yacome and Clara Jones were the only instructors in the Harris County Common School District 16 for school children of black African descent by 1919. Rosa Young Yacome, the highest paid African-American instructor at $50.00 a month, lived west of the Fidelity addition in 1920.

However, by 1922, the "Colored School" building located near the corner of East Street and Main Street in the black enclave of the Clinton community had as its principal and only instructor Ms. Freddie A. Emerson. As well as the hard work involved in teaching multiple grades, Emerson also faced a daily commute from her home in Harrisburg. She boarded a ferry daily on the south bank of the Buffalo Bayou, in order to cross the water to Clinton. Emerson lived only a short walk from the hand-pulled ferry to Johnson's Landing on the north side of the bayou, from where she would take a well-worn footpath to the black quarters located on South Main St., Clinton. White students who traveled to Harrisburg used this same ferry route to reach Milby High School, while others used this method to get to Harrisburg before catching a trolleybus to Houston.

In their book Galena Park: The Community that Shaped its own History, Roger Leslie and Sue Elkins Edwards suggest that the white Clinton School building was relocated in 1924 to the Fidelity Addition. A Sentinel newspaper staff writer states that the school was sold to a black church congregation and moved to a location on Avenue D and Main Street in the black quarter. However, Harris County Block Book records indicate that the Colored School on East Street and Main Street remained as a tax-exempt building until 1931, when one of the two lots it occupied was sold while the Galena Park Independent School District remained in control of lot 9. Records show that in the same year a school building became exempt from taxes on the Fidelity site on Bolden St. Whether or not folklore has become mixed up with actual history, the Fidelity School did exist on Bolden Street. Two years previously in 1930, the Galena Park Independent School District (GPISD) had become an official body and their placing of a facility at the Fidelity site was the second act designed to nurture African-American student education. The GPISD's ownership of two lots on East Street and their tax exempt status suggest that the body or its antecedents had begun providing education to black children eight years before it became an independent school district.

This school housed eight grade levels and offered courses in science, reading, writing, math, agriculture, and home economics. The classes contained twenty to thirty pupils almost equally spread across the various age groups. All were taught the same courses — reading writing and arithmetic. Children had near one-on-one instruction as they each had to approach the instructor's desk and read aloud. In 1931 Mrs. Emerson taught classes alongside her colleague Laura Bailey.

The Fidelity School then experienced growing pains whereupon the GPISD board authorized removal of a partition between two rooms of the school. Mrs. Emerson was re-elected to the position of principal and Laura Bailey was also re-elected by the board. The board also authorized the superintendent to add one additional African American teacher to the staff of the school. By 1937, the GPISD realized that both white and black school populations were still growing and petitioned the state for $85,000, $1000 to $2000 of which was to be used to add two more rooms to the one-room Fidelity School. The old white elementary school was abandoned in 1938 when the GPISD built a new facility. When subsequent improvements to the Fidelity school proved necessary, lumber from the abandoned white student school was used to add two rooms to the one-room facility.

While much of the stability and growth of the Fidelity School was tethered to the growth and development of Clinton, Fidelity had additional problems inherent in the make up of the African-American community, which was splintered by the demographics of the area. One part of the black community lived in the southern portion of Clinton while the other was located several miles away in a thinly populated neighborhood along the two-block wide five-mile long Burns Road. The Fidelity Addition took its name from the Fidelity Shipyard located a few hundred yards from Fidelity or Burns Road. To add to the diversity of those demographics, blacks also lived in section houses spread further west along Clinton Drive near McCarty Drive. The men of these families worked for the railroad that formed part of the terminus along the port at Clinton.

By 1947, the African-American population had grown to the point where more teachers were employed to meet the educational needs of the black-student population. The hiring of Mr. Arthur C. Lilly in 1947 proved significant – he would become the only principal of the junior/senior high school. Mrs. Freddie Sandle had carried out most of the teaching for more than twenty years. Fidelity School was still an eight grade school, but by 1947 it had been expanded to include ten classrooms, a library, an office, a music room, a softball field and a bus parking area.

Once students finished the eighth grade, they were bussed to Phillis Wheatley High School in Houston in order to finish their secondary education. In 1934, the GPISD passed a motion to pay Jason Humber $40.00 a month to transport the African American children to Houston to attend high school that year. Before 1949, students only had to finish the eleventh grade to get a high school diploma and most students who attended Wheatley from Fidelity had already taken algebra so they were able to skip a grade.

The commuter system was a troublesome process, therefore Mr. Arthur C. Lilly petitioned the GPISD to allow the school to add one grade a year until it possessed twelve grades. In the 1953–1954 school year, the first graduating class of five students matriculated from Fidelity School consisting of Nora Eagleton, Marie Nelson, Hilda Guillory, Effie Watts, and Calvin O. White.

While Fidelity's number of grades grew, a further factor led to the separation of the elementary and high schools. In 1951, the Galena Park City Council approved the development of a shopping center and a new subdivision of 330 homes priced between $7,400 and $8,000 that would be called the Galena Manor Addition. The new development was located immediately adjacent to the Fidelity neighborhood. Inasmuch as Galena Manor provided the link between the two black communities of Fidelity and the South Main Street area of Galena Park, its 330 new families gave a direct boost to the school's population. The GPISD ordered the building of two ultra-modern school buildings, the junior/senior high school and the elementary school. The high school opened in January 1955 and Mr. Arthur C. Lilly became its first and only principal. Built adjacent to the high school, the elementary school opened in September 1956 and Mrs. Freddie Emerson Sandle, by now the longest employed educator at the Fidelity Schools, became the Principal. When she retired in 1960, Mr. John T. Lane took over as second principal.

1970 saw the Fidelity Elementary and High Schools close due to court ordered desegregation. Some of the teachers along with the black student population were integrated into other Galena Park schools. The long legacy of the Fidelity Schools ended when a failure to reach consensus by the citizens of Galena Park on the fate of facility led to its demolition in 1986.

== Notable alumni ==
- Craig Anthony Washington, class of 1958, former US Congressman

== Background ==
Mascot - Black Panther

Colors - Purple and Gold

== Notable Accomplishments ==
=== Academics ===
- Integrated Science Fair District Champions 1956
- Integrated Science Fair District Champions 1957
- First in State Vocal Solo competition 1957
- District Champion in the Integrated Science Fair 1958
- State Champions in the Concert Band competition at Prairie View A & M College 1958

=== Sports ===
==== Football ====
- Football District Champions 1955
- Football District Champions 1956
- Football State 1A Champions 1957
- Football District 3A Champions 1962

==== Boys Track ====
- District Track Champions 1956
- District Track Champions 1957
- District Track Champions 1958
- State Track Champions 1968

==== Girls Track ====
- State Track Champions 1964
- Junior Olympic Champions 1964
- State Track Champions 1965
- Fidelity Relays Champions 1965

==== Women's Division ====
- Runner up T.S.U. RElays 1965
- Runner up Gulf Federations Meet 1965
- State Track Champions 1968

==== Tennis ====
- Tennis State Singles Champions 1958

Tennis State Singles Champions Boys and Girls 1968

==== Basketball ====
- Basketball District Champions 1955
- Basketball State 2A Champion 1961
- Basketball District 2A Champion 1962
- Basketball District 3A Champion 1964
- Basketball State 3A Champion 1966
- Basketball District 3A Champion 1967

=== Fidelity Manor Alumni Events ===
- Fidelity Manor All School Reunion 2008.
- The Bath House-The Fidelity Manor Awareness Center-Acquired on March 4, 2008. Expected completion date of remodeling and opening September 2008.
