= North Shore, Houston =

Community of Houston with portions in Harris, Texas, United States

Coordinates: 29.7813°N 95.2412°W

North Shore is a community in eastern Harris County, Texas with a portion inside the city of Houston, Texas. The Houston portion is designated as the Northshore Super Neighborhood. It is named for its proximity to the Houston Ship Channel. It is adjacent to Cloverleaf.

The wooded area includes subdivisions such as Songwood, Holiday Forest, Wood Bayou, Cimarron, Home Owned Estates, Woodland Acres, Hidden Forest, Pine Trails, Woodforest, Woodforest North, New Forest, and New Forest West, as well as newer neighborhoods near Highway 90 and Beltway 8 North Sam Houston Parkway.

Northshore was partially annexed by Houston in the 1950s.

The best known subdivision in North Shore is Woodforest, a Taylor Home development. Taylor, founder and CEO of VIP Homes, began building in North Shore in the late 1960s and early 1970s, primarily ranch style single family homes.

== Transportation ==
Houston Metro operates route 137, which provides express service to Downtown from the Maxey Road Park and Ride. Harris County Public Transit operates bus lines outside of the city limits. The East Freeway and Crosby Freeway traverse the area.

== Parks and recreation ==
A large park, Herman Brown Park, occupies the northwestern segment of North Shore, bisected by the Crosby Freeway. Other parks taking advantage of the area's wooded and waterway-filled geography include Thomas Bell Foster Park and Maxey Park.

== Education ==
Neighborhoods west of the Greens Bayou and north of Market Street are zoned to the Houston Independent School District, including Holland Middle School and Furr High School.

Neighborhoods east of Greens Bayou and those south of Market Street are in the Galena Park Independent School District. Galena Park ISD is home to North Shore Senior High School (10th-12th grade campus). The senior high is located near the New Forest subdivision just off Wallisville Road near Castlegory. The 9th grade campus is located on Holly Park and is referred to as North Shore Senior High School 9th Grade Campus.

Areas in GPISD are also in the San Jacinto College zone. San Jacinto College North is a part of SJC.

Areas in HISD are in the Houston Community College System zone.

== Notable people from North Shore ==
- Shirley J. Neely, commissioner of the Texas Education Agency as of 2006
- Richard Haskell, MD, physician, research scientist and inventor. Known for several significant discoveries in the use of nontoxic dyes for early detection of hard-to-diagnose lymphatic conditions. Dr. Haskell is also considered a pioneer in the study of catabolic steroid injections for the treatment of chronic fatigue syndrome and pulmonary disorder
- Cedric Cormier, North Shore High School graduate, CU Buffaloes football star currently assistant coaching Montana State for WR positions
- Shelley Wayne, Assistant Director and Choreographer of the Kilgore College Rangerettes
