= Port Houston =

Neighborhood in Houston, Texas

Port Houston is a neighborhood located on the East Side of Houston, Texas, United States.

Port Houston is an industrial, mostly Hispanic community located near the Houston Ship Channel and the Port of Houston. In a 2007 article John Nova Lomax of the Houston Press described Port Houston as "a blue-collar Mexican neighborhood of wrought-iron fences and wood-framed houses." Port Houston has many small houses. Petrochemical businesses and trucking companies have operations in the community. Laura Isensee of KUHF wrote that Port Houston is "not a typical neighborhood".

== Government and infrastructure ==
Residents are in Houston City Council District H.

The first fireboat to operate in the Houston area was named the Port Houston.

Harris Health System (formerly Harris County Hospital District) designated Ripley Health Center in the East End for ZIP code 77029. In 2000 Ripley was replaced by the Gulfgate Health Center. The designated public hospital is Ben Taub General Hospital in the Texas Medical Center.

== Education ==
Residents are within the Houston Independent School District. Zoned schools include Pleasantville Elementary School, Holland Middle School, and Furr High School.

Port Houston Elementary School, formerly the elementary school of the neighborhood, was constructed in 1909. Furr was built in 1961, and Holland was built in 1979. Port Houston Elementary School had an international shipping magnet program. Port Houston had an afterschool program and offered English as a second language classes for parents.

In 2014 HISD proposed closing Port Houston Elementary. In response, several members of the community argued against closing the school. The plans call for Port Houston to be combined with Pleasantville Elementary. Opposition argued that the walk to Pleasantville would be unsafe, that closing the school would harm the community, and that the school in 2013 had distinguished scores in mathematics and reading in state tests. Later in 2014, HISD announced that Port Houston will stay open. Effective 2026, Port Houston elementary was scheduled to close with students moving to Pleasantville Elementary.
