= North–South All-Star Classic =

College football all-star game

North–South All-Star Classic (defunct)
- Stadium: Galena Park ISD Stadium
- Location: Houston, Texas
- Operated: 2007

Sponsors
- Inta Juice

The North–South All-Star Classic was a postseason college football all-star game, the only edition of which took place in 2007. The game was played in Houston at the Galena Park ISD Stadium and telecast on ESPN2.

On January 13, 2007, the North team, led by San Jose State coach Dick Tomey, defeated the South team, coached by Texas Tech coach Mike Leach, 28–17. Galena Park ISD had a two-year agreement to host the game. The second annual edition of the game was tentatively scheduled for January 12, 2008, but was cancelled. The game was sponsored by Inta Juice, an energy drink.

== Game results ==
Date Played	Winning Team		Losing Team		Ref.
January 13, 2007	North College-Stars	28	South College-Stars	17	
January 12, 2008	cancelled				

=== 2007: North 28, South 17 ===
Scoring summary

Quarter	Time	Drive			Team	Scoring information	Score	
Quarter	Time	Plays	Yards	TOP	Team	Scoring information	North	South
1					South	39-yard field goal by Darren McCaleb	0	3
2					South	Fumble recovery returned 36 yards for touchdown by Chris Harris, Darren McCaleb kick good	0	10
2	6:38				North	Corey Anderson 1-yard touchdown run, kick good	7	10
2					South	Dominique Zeigler 3-yard touchdown reception from Jeff Smith, Darren McCaleb kick good	7	17
3					North	James Jones 16-yard touchdown reception from Luke Getsy, kick good	14	17
4	10:33				North	D. D. Terry 3-yard touchdown run, kick good	21	17
4	0:28				North	Luke Getsy 2-yard touchdown run, kick good	28	17
"TOP" = time of possession. For other American football terms, see Glossary of American football.							28	17

== See also ==
- List of college bowl games
