= Pleasantville, Houston =

Neighborhood in Houston, Texas, United States

Coordinates: 29.7632°N 95.2783°W

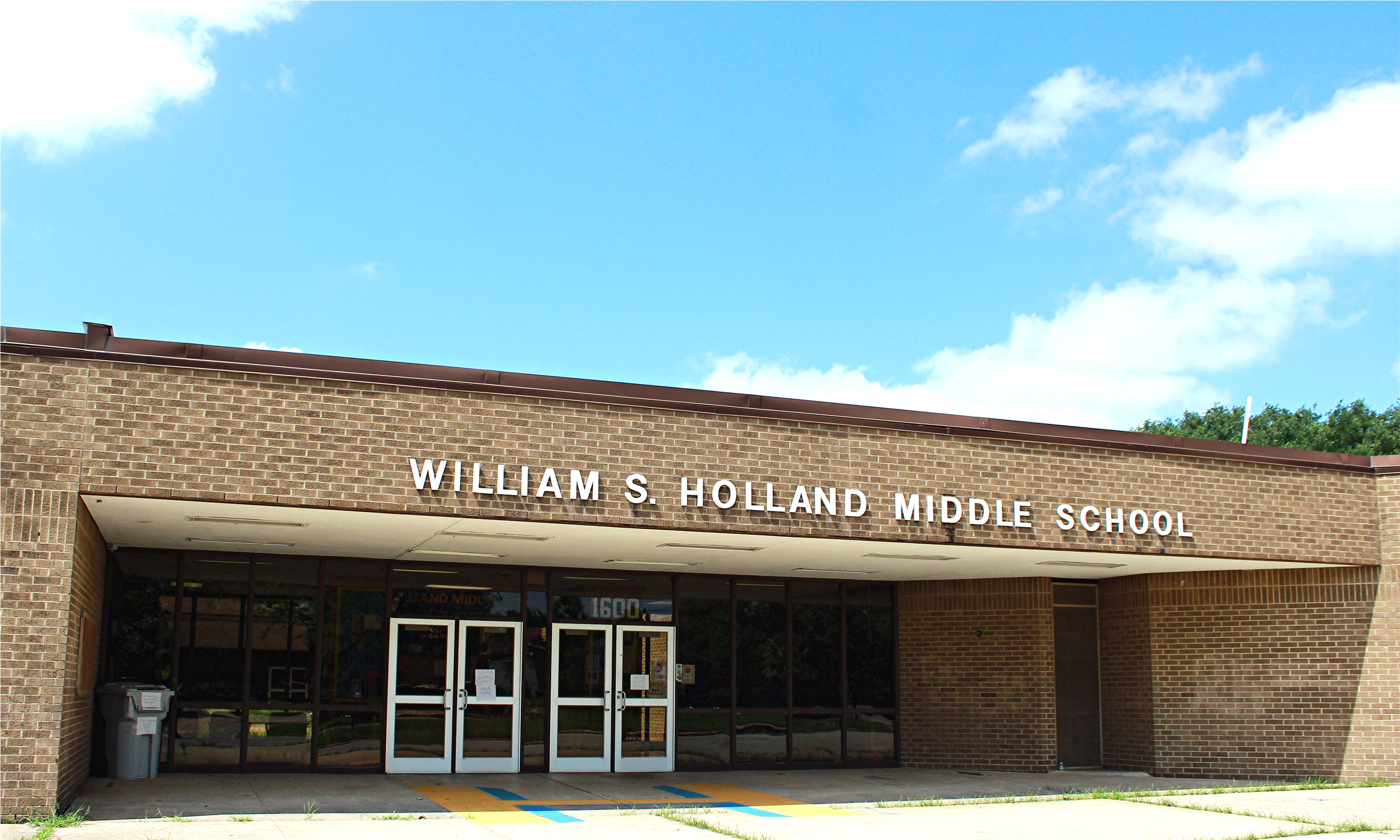
William S. Holland Middle School

Pleasantville is a neighborhood located in Houston, Texas, United States. Pleasantville is predominantly African-American, and located inside of the 610 Loop in eastern Houston

== History ==
The Pleasantville neighborhood was established in 1948 by two land developers, Melvin Silverman and H.M. Cohen, who partnered with real estate agent and mortgage broker, Robinson Judson Robinson Sr. Silverman, owned property to the north of the Houston Ship Channel. In the post World War II period, the two aimed to create a community for Jewish American military veterans and African American servicemen, two groups that were known to face housing discrimination at the time.

The community attracted a wave of African American residents as it became one of the first areas where they could legally own a home. Residents became heavily involved with their community, forming a Pleasantville Civic Club League and a Garden Club among many other community organizations that continuously worked to improve the area.

Although the deed restrictions limited the area of Pleasantville to residential purposes only, the lack of zoning in Houston allowed for an encroachment of industrial buildings within close proximity of Pleasantville. This encroachment was accelerated after the finished construction of the I-610 highway that outlines the eastern border of the residential area. The resulting increase in traffic from the highway attracted more industrial establishments such as the Southern Produce Co distribution center, Budweiser, and several chemical plants.

On the morning of June 24, 1995, a seven alarm fire broke out in a chemical storage warehouse in the Pleasantville neighborhood. The fire burned uncontrolled for a day, and firefighters had to evacuate due to lack of knowledge of the chemicals that the warehouse contained. The neighborhood was evacuated. In response to the fire and community advocacy, Mayor Bob Lanier promised to create a better system for disclosing chemical locations in residential areas. The Hazardous Materials Ordinance was passed in 1996 to better regulate where hazardous materials can be stored.

Pleasantville has a demonstrated history of community advocacy. Achieving Community Tasks Successfully (ACTS), a community-based advocacy group, started working for flood mitigation after Hurricane Harvey in 2017. In 2019, ACTS launched a community-owned air monitoring network to address environmental justice concerns. Due to Pleasantville’s location next to the ship channel, the interstate, and industrial sites like a large brewery, as well as events like the warehouse fire, Pleasantville residents became concerned by air quality issues. With funding and support from groups such as the Environmental Defense Fund and Texas Southern University, Pleasantville is establishing at least one community-owned and monitored air monitor. The community of Pleasantville is highly engaged in the project and will use the information from the monitors to inform future plans.

== Cityscape ==
Pleasantville is in proximity to the 610 Loop and the portion of Interstate 10 labeled the "East Freeway". The area surrounding the community includes rail lines and industrial businesses.

== Government and infrastructure ==
The Houston Police Department Northeast Patrol Division serves the neighborhood .

Houston City Council District B serves Pleasantville.

The Pleasantville and Groveland Terrace subdivisions are a part of the Super Neighborhood Council No. 57 Pleasantville Area, which officially formed in July 2001.

In the 1991 Mayor of Houston election most Pleasantville voters voted for Sylvester Turner; Pleasantville's voter turnout was almost 50 percent.

Debbie Allen founded the Pleasantville Strategic Revitalization Planning Committee, which became sponsored by the city government. The Texas Southern University (TSU) School of Public Affairs and several community-based organizations are a part of the committee. Allen became the committee's president.

Harris Health System (formerly Harris County Hospital District) designated Ripley Health Center in the East End for ZIP code 77029. In 2000 Ripley was replaced by the Gulfgate Health Center. The designated public hospital is Ben Taub General Hospital in the Texas Medical Center.

== Crime and environment ==
In 2005 there was a door-to-door survey conducted by the Strategic Planning Committee and TSU. Residents stated in the survey that their major concerns were gang activity, drug trafficking, a lack of presence of police, drive-by shootings, and prostitution. In addition residents mentioned issues with noise pollution originating from railroad tracks, abandoned and vacant buildings, and the overall quality of the environment. On Saturday June 10, 2005, residents attended a meeting at the Judson Robinson Sr. Community Center to discuss the survey.

By 2008 Allen had, as part of the METRO Adopt-a-Stop/Shelter program, adopted 28 bus stops in Pleasantville, and she stated that she did this in order to stop criminal activity from occurring at the bus stops.

== Education ==
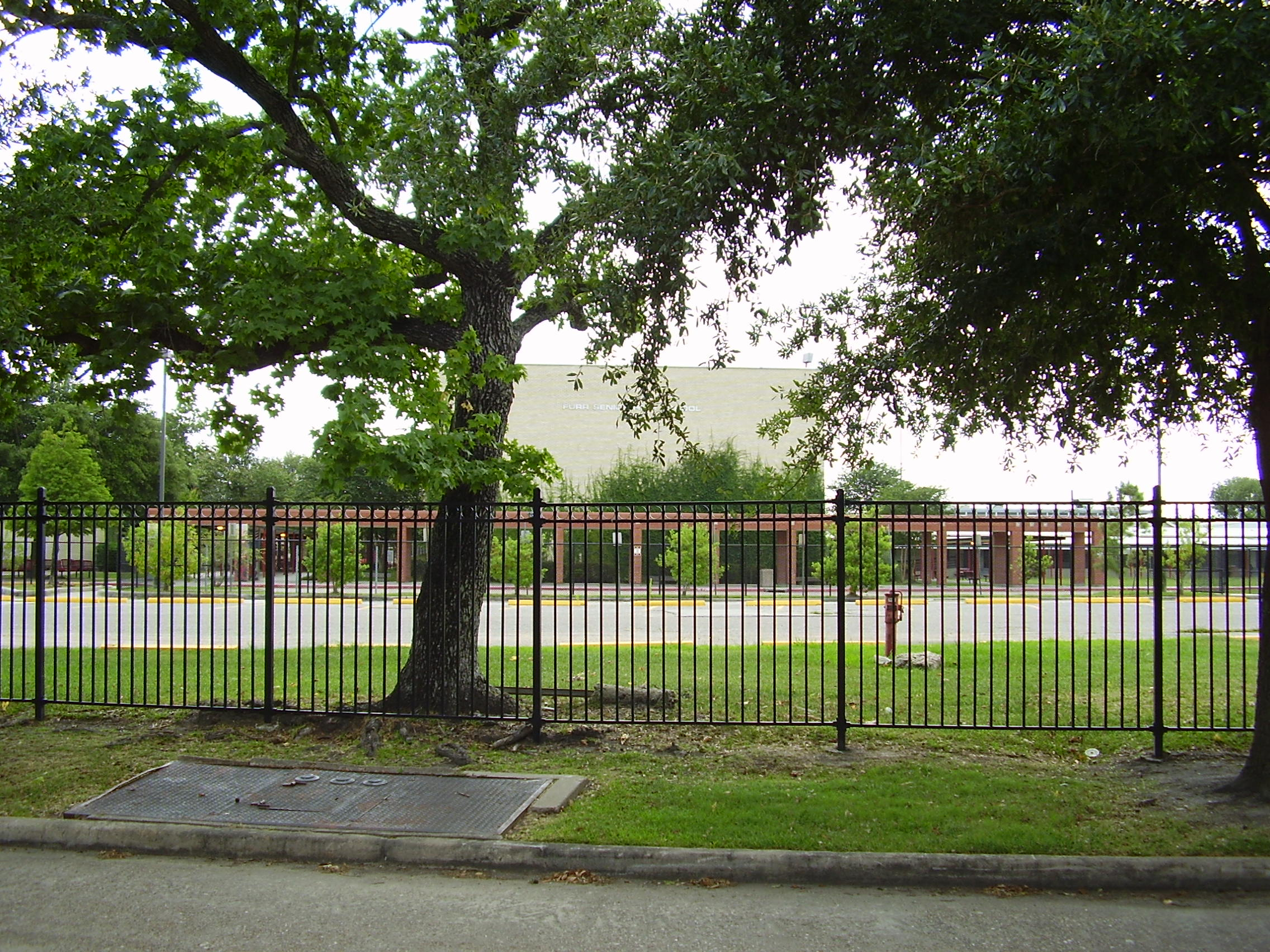
Furr High School

Pleasantville is served by the Houston Independent School District. Zoned schools include Pleasantville Elementary School, Holland Middle School, and Furr High School.

The Pleasantville Neighborhood Library of the Houston Public Library is in the community.

== Parks and recreation ==
The Robinson Sr. Community Center is located in Pleasantville.

It was named after Judson W. Robinson Sr., a precinct chairperson in Pleasantville, the founder of real estate company Judson W. Robinson & Sons, Inc., a director of the Riverside General Hospital, and a member of the board of commissioners of the Housing Authority of the city of Houston. He was born in Crockett, Texas and he died on Sunday May 11, 1986. The Houston Chronicle stated that he was "a notable leader in the city's black community". His son, Judson W. Robinson Jr., served as a member of Houston City Council.
