= Furr High School =

Ebbert L. Furr High School
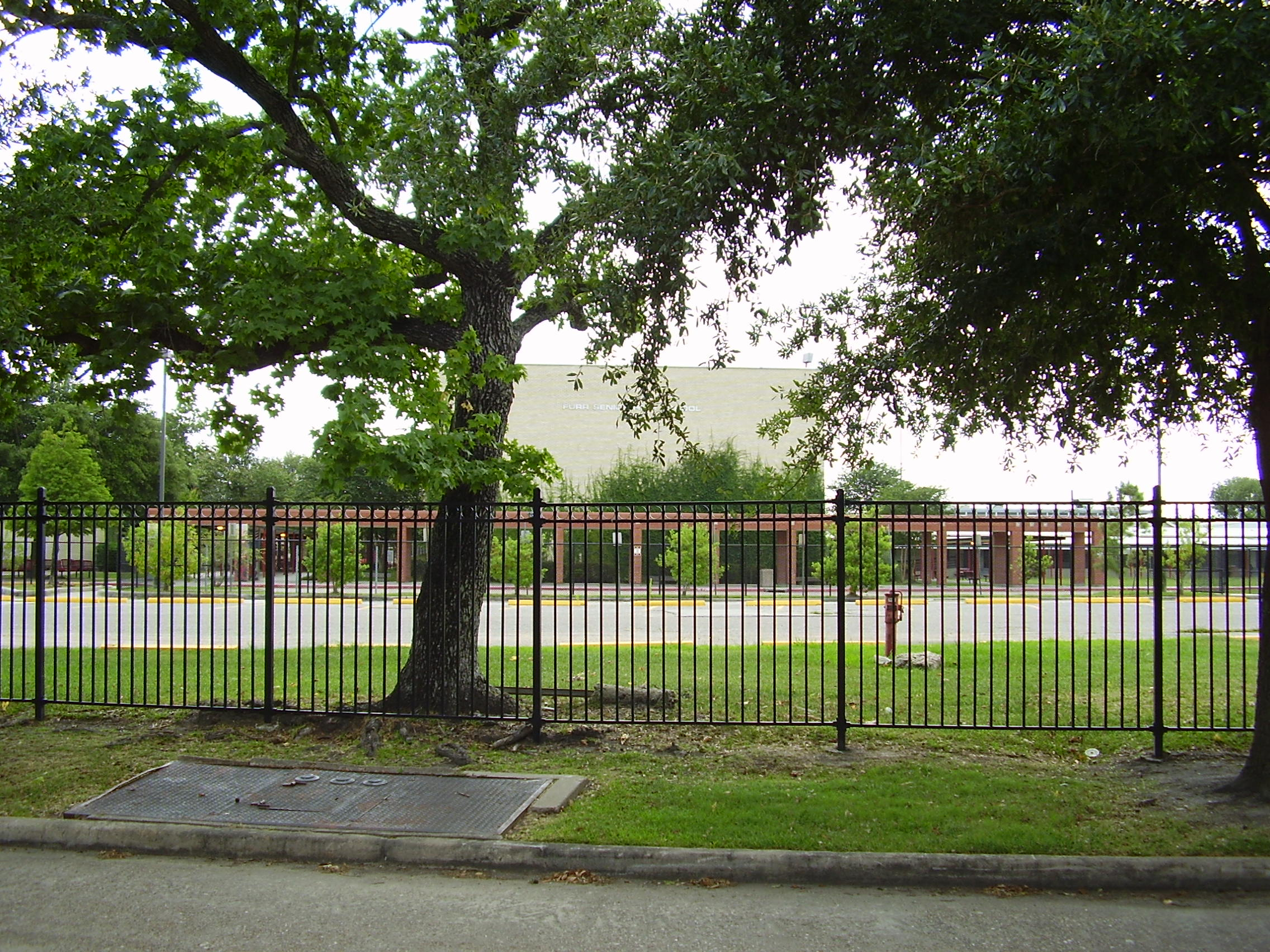

Location
- 520 Mercury Dr. Houston, Texas 77013; United States; 29°46′46″N 95°14′54″W

Information
- Type: Public
- School district: Houston Independent School District
- Principal: Steven Stapleton
- Teaching staff: 78.66 (FTE)
- Grades: 9-12
- Enrollment: 1,025 (2023-2024)
- Student to teacher ratio: 13.03
- Colors: Red, white, and black
- Mascot: Brahman
- Website: Furr High School

Ebbert L. Furr High School is a secondary school located in Houston, Texas, United States. Furr, which serves grades 9 through 12, is a part of the Houston Independent School District.

Furr is adjacent to Herman Brown Park and the Songwood subdivision.

Furr is home to the META (Mindful Exploration of Technology and the Arts) Magnet Program; prior to 2007 Furr hosted an international studies magnet program.

The HISD charter school REACH Charter is located at Furr.

== History ==
The district broke ground for the Furr building in 1960; the campus opened in fall 1961. The school was named after Ebbert L. Furr, a landholder who owned the land that Furr High School is located on.

Prior to 1997 residents zoned to Furr also had the option to attend Austin and Milby high schools; in 1997 the school district canceled the option. Before 2000, Furr High School had a larger attendance boundary than it does as of 2010. After the 2000 opening of Chávez High School, portions of the former Furr boundary were reassigned to Austin and Milby high schools.

After 2002, the Furr high school yearbook was discontinued. The final printing had a financial loss of around $3,000 ($5370.03 inflation-adjusted).

=== Principalship of Bertie Simmons ===
Bertie Simmons (died 2021) began her term as principal in 2000. She had retired from teaching, but decided to become a principal after her granddaughter died in a skiing accident. In 2003 a riot occurred at Furr. While many assistant principals wanted to send the 42 involved children to CEP, a disciplinary school, Simmons called them into her office to have a discussion. The students said that they did not believe that the September 11 attacks occurred, and that they believed the authorities were trying to deceive them. Simmons told them that she would take them to New York City in the June following that school year if the school remained at peace. After the school term completed, the students traveled to New York City. In 2010 Simmons was ranked as the 2010 Houston Press best school principal. Laura Isensee of Houston Public Media stated in 2017 that Simmons's term was relatively long as many principals of low income urban high schools have relatively short terms.

Around 2010 several students who originated from Honduras and newly enrolled at Furr were M13 gang members. In 2016 Margaret Downing of the Houston Press wrote that by 2016 "they were handled and are long gone".

Terry Grier gave Simmons an Excellence in Leadership award in 2015 despite previously having some workplace disagreements with Simmons.

In 2016 Furr won the Super School competition, organized by Laurene Powell Jobs, prevailing over about 700 other schools. The prize was a $10 million grant, awarded by the XQ Institute, and the Furr administration planned to use the money to revitalize the teaching program. The grant was awarded partly because Simmons had installed a conflict mediation room for students called the "thinkery room". Simmons also intended to have an on-campus community center funded with the grant money.

In October 2017 the HISD administration suspended Simmons, accusing her of disobeying a district directive to suspend school uniforms in the wake of Hurricane Harvey and threatening to issue tickets for non-compliance, as well as threatening students with a baseball bat. According to Simmons, she had the right to set a dress code, and that the bat statements were commonly understood as jokes. On a previous occasion students gave Simmons an engraved bat as a gift in light of the jokes. Simmon's lawyer, Scott Newar, filed complaints with the U.S. Department of Education and the U.S. Department of Justice. He accused the HISD administration of attempting to remove Simmons in favor of a non-Hispanic white principals and of trying to seize and redistribute the $10 million Super School grant. Simmons stated that the project organizers only intended for the grant to go to Furr and that it would not be given if the money did not arrive at the intended destination, but that HISD administrators wanted the grant money used in multiple locations in the district. Students staged a school walk-out in favor of Simmons. In May 2018 HISD announced that an investigation conducted by lawyers concluded that some administrators inappropriately altered grades. HISD officials did not clarify whether Simmons will still be employed by HISD. Jacob Carpenter of the Houston Chronicle stated "Although HISD officials did not implicate Simmons on Tuesday, the findings appear to spell an ignominious end to her five-decade career in HISD." The HISD board terminated her after a 5-1 vote in June 2018. Simmons sued the district, stating that it discriminated against her being white and against her age. She also filed an appeal with the Texas Education Agency (TEA), although the agency hearing examiner's recommendations are not binding on HISD. HISD gave Simmons a $100,000 settlement in September 2018. Simmons donated the settlement money and has a memoir Whispers of Hope: The Story of My Life, scheduled to be released on November 2, 2019.

=== Post-Simmons ===
Simmons' community center was never implemented and the "thinkery room" was repurposed.

Rosa E. Hernandez became interim principal in 2017. Simmons's successor served for one year. The suspension rates increased after Simmons' departure; Simmons stated it was mostly among African-American students.

== Operations ==
By 2017 the school enacted an escape room-style interviewing process for potential teachers as a way of discovering possible attributes that would not be apparent in a traditional job interview.

== Academics ==
In 2017 the school announced that it would establish a separate academic program for 9th grade students.

By 2017 the school established "Genius Time", a series of rotating elective classes, not taken for a grade, in which students may explore potential interests. Each class has two periods per week and has a duration of six weeks.

Because many students take the school bus to Furr, tutorials are held during the school day instead of after school.

== Student body ==
In the 2022-2023 school year, Furr had 1,173 students. Most of the students who attend Furr live in the surrounding zoned neighborhood.

- 81.3% Hispanic American
- 16.1% African American
- 1.6% White American
- 0.3% Asian American
- 0.3% Native American
- 0.2% Multiracial

== School uniforms ==
At one time Furr required its students to wear school uniforms. Bertie Simmons, the principal, said that the school adopted uniforms because the school had fifteen known gangs that had a presence there. By 2017 the HISD administration suspended uniforms in the wake of Hurricane Harvey, but Simmons was trying to reintroduce them to combat gang issues; according to a friend of Simmons quoted in the Houston Press, HISD administrators were uninterested in allowing more high schools to have uniforms.

== Neighborhoods served by Furr ==
Furr serves several Houston neighborhoods in eastern Houston inside and outside the 610 Loop, including Clinton Park, Pleasantville, Port Houston, Songwood Homes, Oates Prairie and Northshore-area neighborhoods north of Market Street and west of the Greens Bayou. The school also serves the Houston ISD portion of Jacinto City.

The Houston Housing Authority complex Uvalde Ranch Apartments is in the Furr zone.

Prior to 2000 Furr served portions of the East End, including much of Magnolia Park.

== Feeder patterns ==
The following elementary schools feed into Furr:

- R. P. Harris
- Oates
- Pleasantville
- Robinson
- Whittier

One middle school, Holland Middle School, feeds into Furr.

== Notable alumni ==
- Anthony Young - Professional baseball player who played for the New York Mets, Chicago Cubs and Houston Astros
