= Jacinto City, Texas =

City of Jacinto City
- City
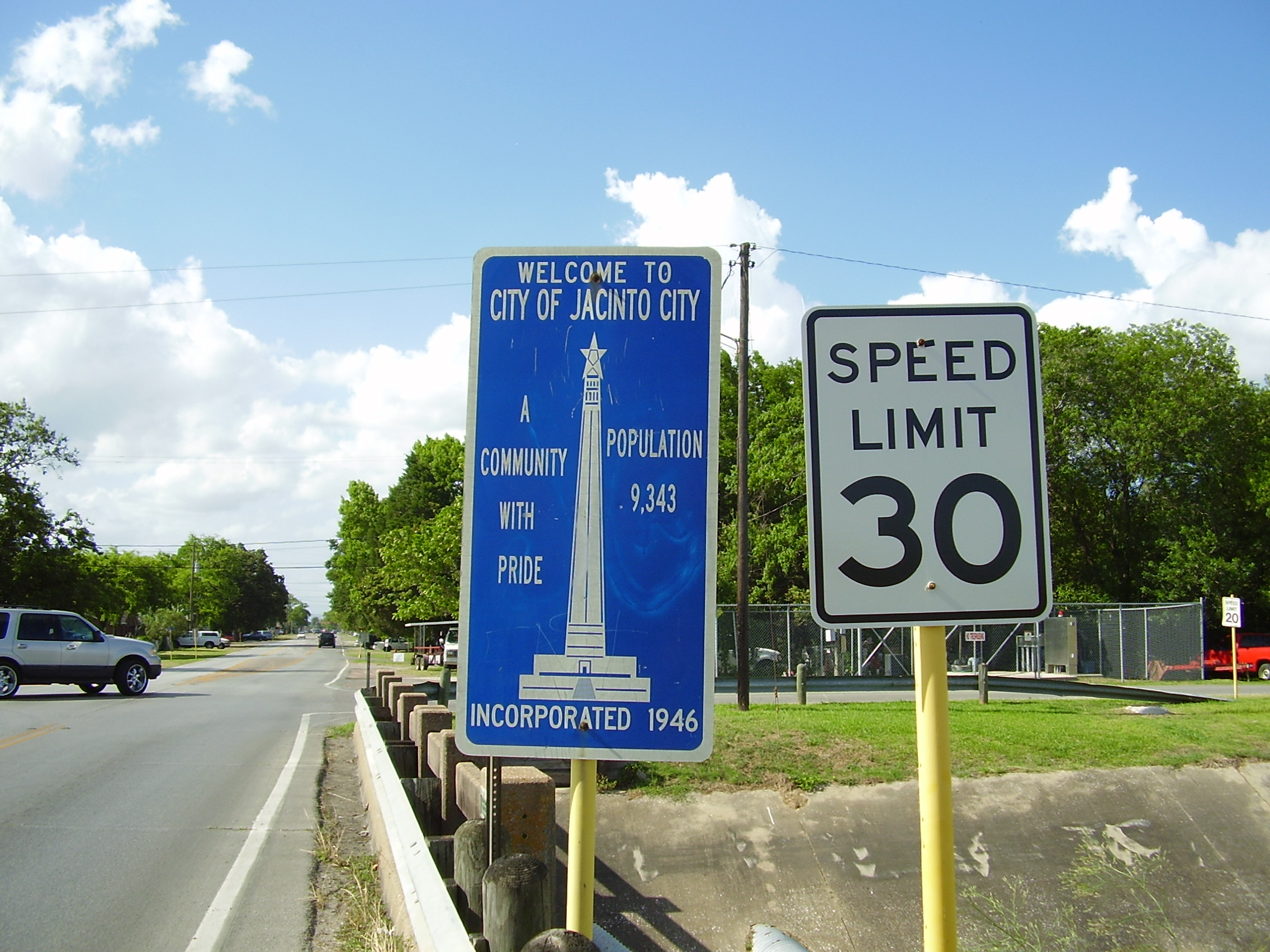
- Jacinto City entrance sign

- Location in Harris County and the state of Texas
- Coordinates: 29°45′56″N 95°14′25″W
- Country: United States
- State: Texas
- County: Harris
- Incorporated: 1947

Area
  - Total: 1.85 sq mi (4.80 km^{2})
  - Land: 1.85 sq mi (4.80 km^{2})
  - Water: 0 sq mi (0.00 km^{2})
- Elevation: 30 ft (9.1 m)

Population (2020)
  - Total: 9,613
  - Density: 5,646.6/sq mi (2,180.17/km^{2})
- Time zone: UTC-6 (CST)
  - Summer (DST): UTC-5 (CDT)
- ZIP code: 77029
- Area code: 713
- FIPS code: 48-37156
- GNIS feature ID: 1374254
- Website: www.jacintocity-tx.gov

Jacinto City is a city in Harris County, Texas, United States, east of the intersection of Interstate 10 and the East Loop of Interstate 610. Jacinto City is part of the Houston–Pasadena–The Woodlands metropolitan area and is bordered by the cities of Houston and Galena Park. The population was 9,613 at the 2020 census.

== History ==
In 1941 Frank Sharp established a subdivision which filled with shipyard workers and workers at nearby steel mills and war plants. Jacinto City incorporated in 1947 with nearly 3,800 residents; its first mayor was Inch Handler. Because of the 1947 incorporation, Houston did not incorporate Jacinto City's territory into its city limits, while Houston annexed surrounding areas that were unincorporated. The town still serves as a bedroom community for local industry. In the 1950s the city opened a city hall and recreational facilities. By 1960 the city had 9,500 people and by 1964 the city had 11,500 people. In 1966 the city had seventeen churches, two schools, one hospital, one bank, and one library. A waste-water facility funded by the Environmental Protection Agency opened in 1972; the Handbook of Texas stated that this may be due to complaints from residents about chemical vapors in 1969. In 1990 the city had 9,343 people.

Jacinto City was known for the murder of Louis "Buddy" Musso by Susan (or Suzanne) "Sue" Basso in 1998. Basso lived in Jacinto City and held Musso against his will there; Musso died in an apartment unit used by an accomplice in Houston. Musso's corpse was dumped in neighboring Galena Park.

From 1996 to 2006 the median price per square foot of the Jacinto City houses increased from approximately $35 to approximately $70.

== Geography ==
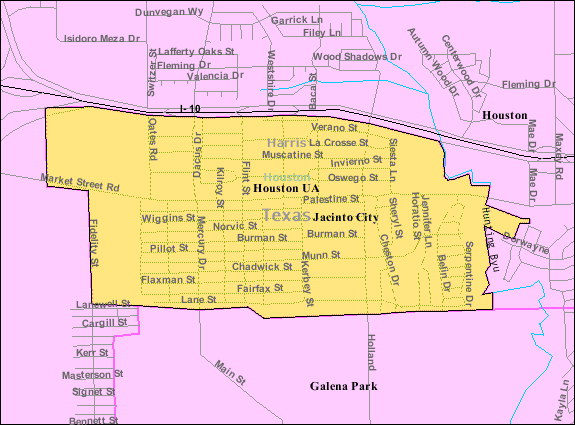
Jacinto City, Texas

According to the United States Census Bureau, the city has a total area of 1.9 square miles (4.9 km^{2}), all land.

Jacinto City is in central Harris County, along the Missouri Pacific Railroad and at the intersection of U.S. Highway 90, Interstate 610, and Interstate 10. It is in proximity to the San Jacinto battleground; Jacinto City derives its name from the battleground. It is next to Galena Park.

== Demographics ==
Historical population
Census	Pop.	Note	%±
1950	6,856		—
1960	9,547		39.3%
1970	9,563		0.2%
1980	8,953		−6.4%
1990	9,343		4.4%
2000	10,302		10.3%
2010	10,553		2.4%
2020	9,613		−8.9%
U.S. Decennial Census

=== Racial and ethnic composition ===
Jacinto City city, Texas – Racial and ethnic composition Note: the US Census treats Hispanic/Latino as an ethnic category. This table excludes Latinos from the racial categories and assigns them to a separate category. Hispanics/Latinos may be of any race.
Race / Ethnicity (NH = Non-Hispanic)	Pop 2000	Pop 2010	Pop 2020	% 2000	% 2010	% 2020
White alone (NH)	2,341	1,294	813	22.72%	12.26%	8.46%
Black or African American alone (NH)	104	329	306	1.01%	3.12%	3.18%
Native American or Alaska Native alone (NH)	27	14	12	0.26%	0.13%	0.12%
Asian alone (NH)	17	23	22	0.17%	0.22%	0.23%
Native Hawaiian or Pacific Islander alone (NH)	0	0	0	0.00%	0.00%	0.00%
Other race alone (NH)	0	9	15	0.00%	0.09%	0.16%
Mixed race or Multiracial (NH)	46	28	89	0.45%	0.27%	0.93%
Hispanic or Latino (any race)	7,767	8,856	8,356	75.39%	83.92%	86.92%
Total	10,302	10,553	9,613	100.00%	100.00%	100.00%

=== 2020 census ===
As of the 2020 census, Jacinto City had a population of 9,613 and a median age of 35.1 years. Children under the age of 18 made up 26.1% of the population, while 12.3% of residents were 65 years of age or older. For every 100 females there were 98.1 males, and for every 100 females age 18 and over there were 97.9 males age 18 and over.

There were 3,055 households in Jacinto City, of which 42.9% had children under the age of 18 living in them. Of these households, 49.1% were married-couple households, 19.3% were households with a male householder and no spouse or partner present, and 25.6% were households with a female householder and no spouse or partner present. About 21.1% of households were made up of individuals, 8.9% had someone living alone who was 65 years of age or older, and 2,361 families resided in the city.

There were 3,297 housing units, of which 7.3% were vacant; the homeowner vacancy rate was 0.1% and the rental vacancy rate was 5.7%.

100.0% of residents lived in urban areas, while 0.0% lived in rural areas.

Racial composition as of the 2020 census
Race	Number	Percent
White	2,796	29.1%
Black or African American	325	3.4%
American Indian and Alaska Native	193	2.0%
Asian	27	0.3%
Native Hawaiian and Other Pacific Islander	1	0.0%
Some other race	3,855	40.1%
Two or more races	2,416	25.1%
Hispanic or Latino (of any race)	8,356	86.9%

=== 2000 census ===
As of the census of 2000, there were 10,302 people, 2,947 households, and 2,392 families residing in the city. The population density was 5,540.8 inhabitants per square mile (2,139.3/km^{2}). There were 3,124 housing units at an average density of 1,680.2 per square mile (648.7/km^{2}). The racial makeup of the city was 18.18% White, 38.23% African American, 0.89% Native American, 0.23% Asian, 0.01% Pacific Islander, 25.66% from other races, and 3.79% from two or more races. Hispanic or Latino of any race were 75.39% of the population.

There were 2,947 households, out of which 48.7% had children under the age of 18 living with them, 63.3% were married couples living together, 11.5% had a female householder with no husband present, and 18.8% were non-families. 16.1% of all households were made up of individuals, and 7.3% had someone living alone who was 65 years of age or older. The average household size was 3.45 and the average family size was 3.88.

In the city, the population was spread out, with 33.3% under the age of 18, 11.9% from 18 to 24, 28.8% from 25 to 44, 16.8% from 45 to 64, and 9.2% who were 65 years of age or older. The median age was 28 years. For every 100 females, there were 100.0 males. For every 100 females age 18 and over, there were 100.3 males.

The median income for a household in the city was $34,672, and the median income for a family was $36,755. Males had a median income of $30,323 versus $22,224 for females. The per capita income for the city was $11,292. About 16.1% of families and 15.8% of the population were below the poverty line, including 15.9% of those under age 18 and 14.2% of those age 65 or over.

== Infrastructure and government ==
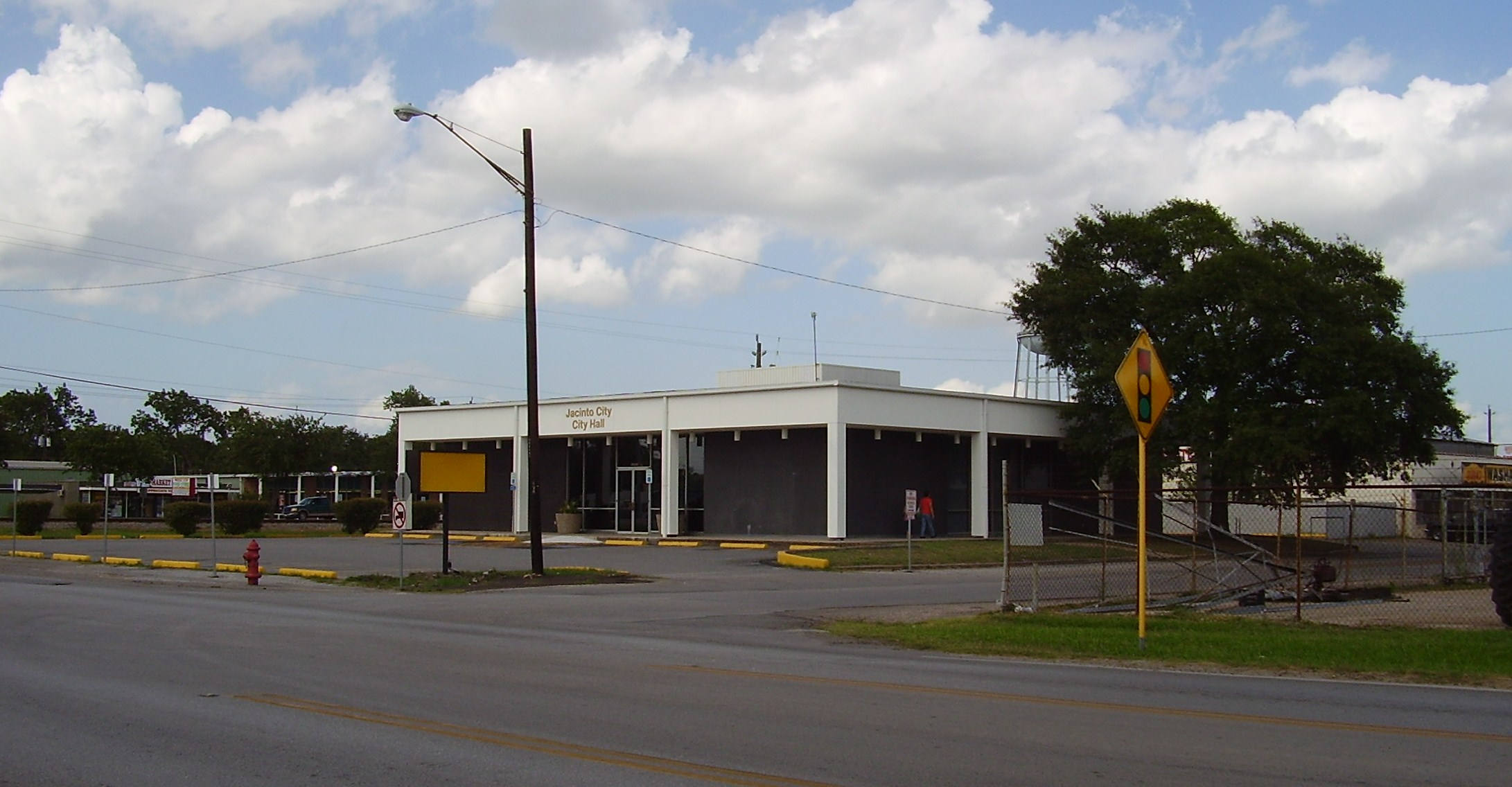
Jacinto City City Hall

Jacinto City practices a city manager form of government with an elected Mayor who presides over the Jacinto City City Council.

- Mayor: Anna Diaz
- City Manager: Lon Squyres
- City Attorney: Jim DeFoyd
- City Secretary: Joyce Raines
- Council Position #1: Jimmy Rivas
- Council Position #2: Gregg Robinson
- Council Position #3: Allen Lee
- Council Position #4: Carmella Garcia
- Council Position #5: Mario Gonzales

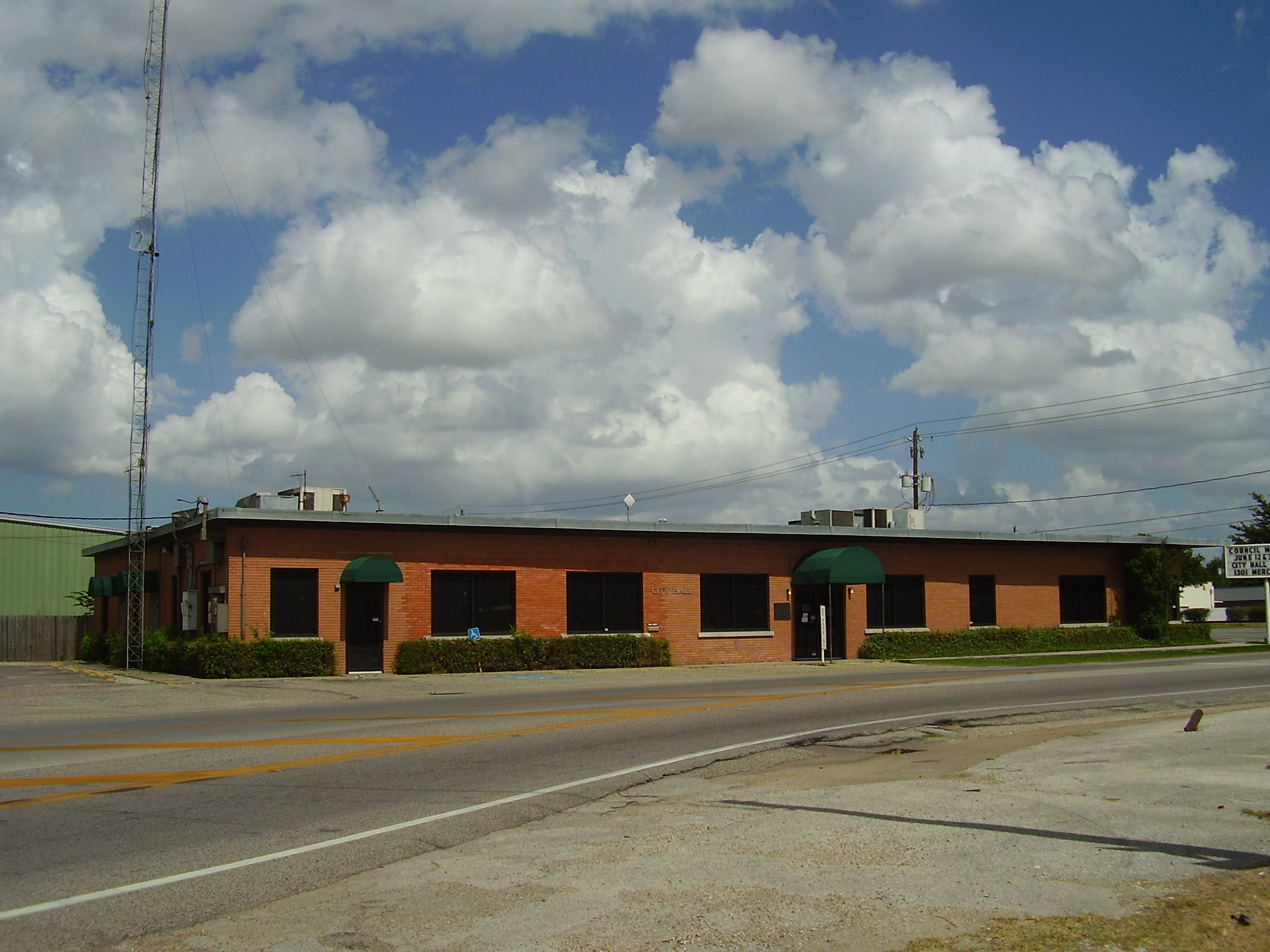
Jacinto City City Hall Annex, the former Jacinto City City Hall, serves as a meeting place for City Council.

The City Council meets at the City Council Annex.

The Jacinto City Fire Department and EMS and the Jacinto City Police Department serve the city.

A city hall facility had been built in the 1950s.

Jacinto City is located within Harris County Precinct 2; as of 2018 Adrian Garcia heads Precinct 2.

Jacinto City is located in District 143 of the Texas House of Representatives. As of 2008 Ana E. Hernandez represents the district. Jacinto City is within District 6 of the Texas Senate; as of 2018 Carol Alvarado is the representative.

Jacinto City is within Texas's 29th congressional district; as of 2018 Sylvia Garcia represents the district.

Locations in Jacinto City have "Houston, Texas" mailing addresses.

The designated public health center of the Harris Health System (formerly Harris County Health System) for the ZIP code 77029 was the Ripley Health Clinic in East End, Houston. In 2000 Ripley was replaced by the Gulfgate Health Center. The designated public hospital is Ben Taub General Hospital in the Texas Medical Center.

== Education ==
=== Primary and secondary schools ===
Public schools

Jacinto City is served by two school districts and a municipal preschool, Jacinto City Preschool. Areas south of Market Street are zoned to Galena Park Independent School District while areas north of Market Street are zoned to Houston Independent School District. This HISD section is within Trustee District VIII, represented by Diana Dávila as of 2008.

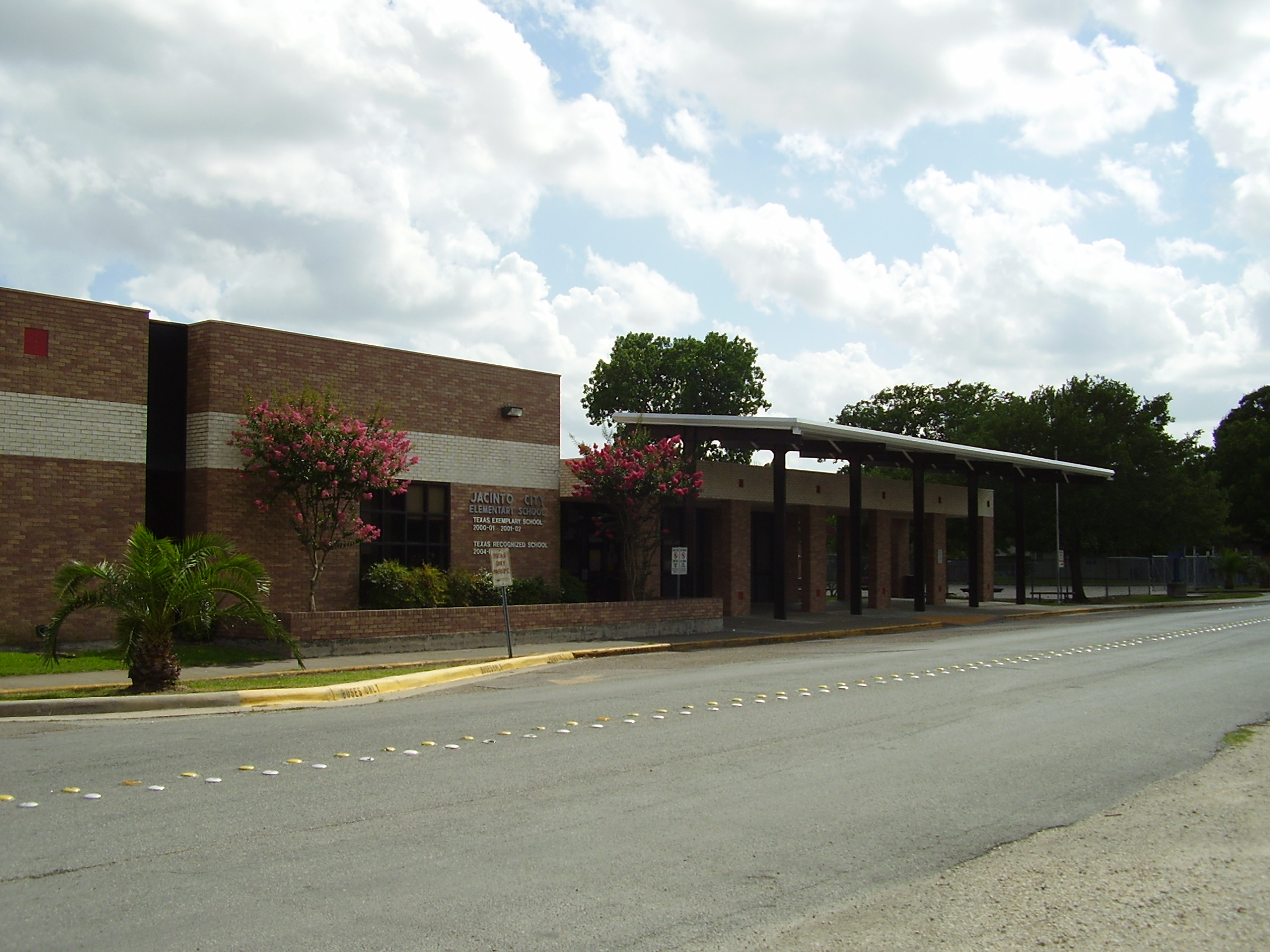
Jacinto City Elementary School

Galena Park Independent School District

Students who are in the GPISD section of Jacinto City are zoned to the following elementary schools:

- Jacinto City Elementary School (Jacinto City) (west of Holland Avenue)
- Pyburn Elementary School (Houston) (east of Holland Avenue)

Students who are in the GPISD section of Jacinto City are zoned to the following middle schools:

- Galena Park Middle School (Galena Park) (west of Holland Avenue)
- Woodland Acres Middle School (Houston) (east of Holland Avenue)

All students who are in the GPISD section of Jacinto City are zoned to:

- Galena Park High School (Galena Park)

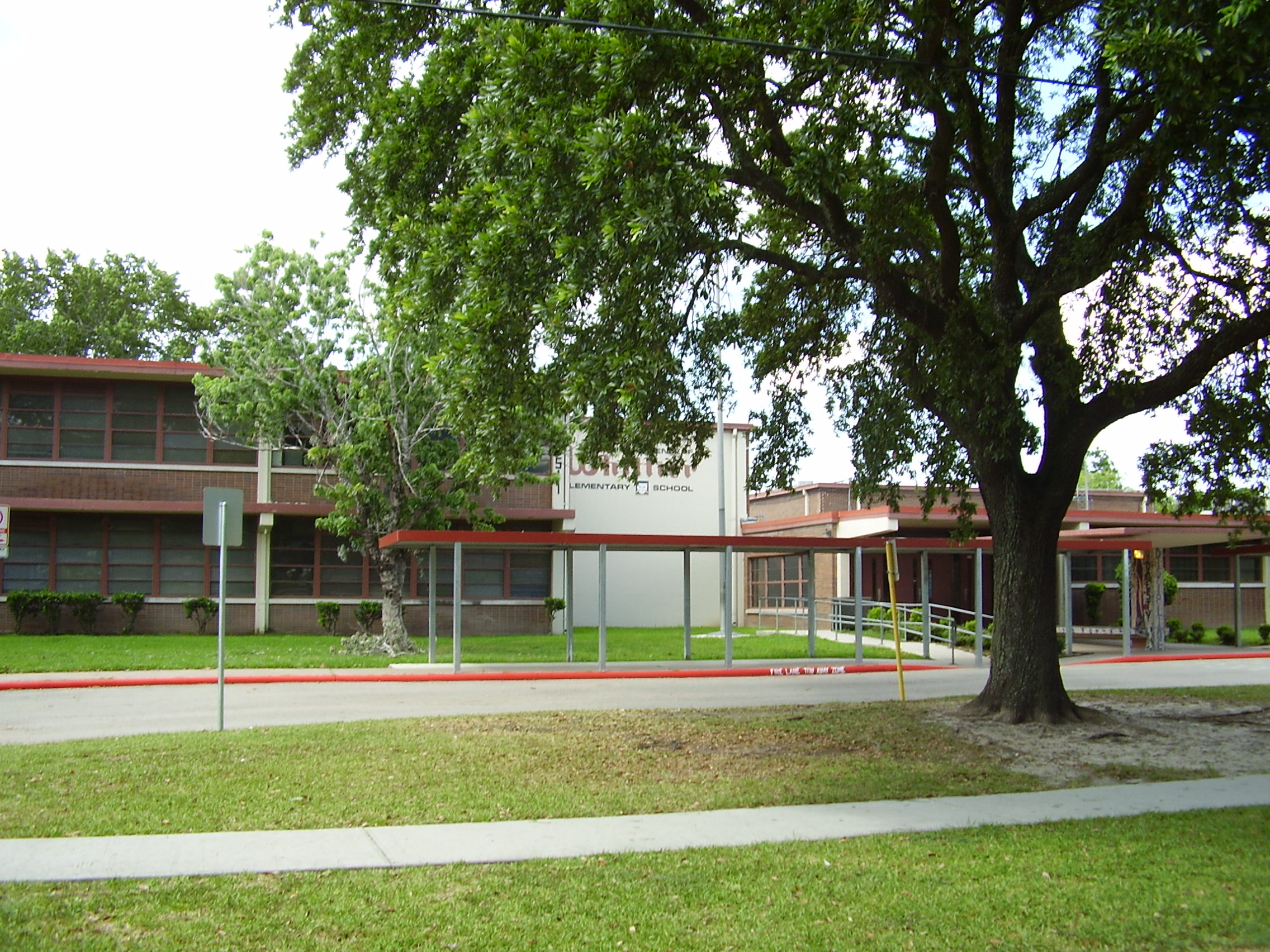
Whittier Elementary School

Houston Independent School District

Students who are in the HISD area are zoned to:

- Whittier Elementary School (Jacinto City)
- Holland Middle School (Houston)
- Furr High School (Houston)

Whittier, named after the poet John Greenleaf Whittier, opened in 1948, Furr opened in 1961, and Holland opened in 1979.

=== Preschool ===
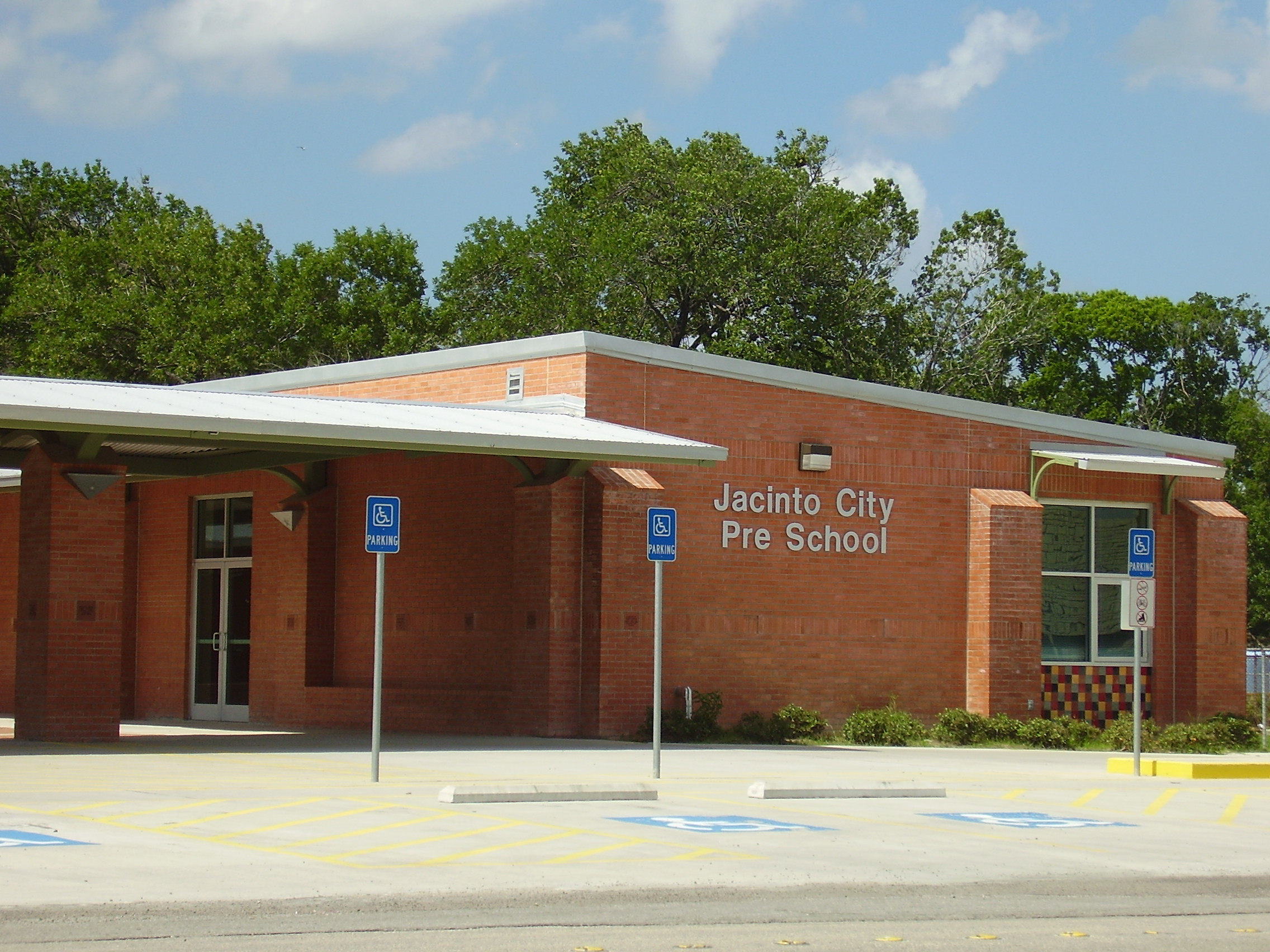
Jacinto City Preschool

Jacinto City operates a municipal preschool as part of its Parks and Recreation Department. Children of the ages of 3 and 4 are eligible to attend. As of 2011, three-year-olds attend on Tuesday and Thursday and four-year-olds attend on Monday, Wednesday, and Friday. Usually about 50 or 60 students enroll in the preschool. In the northern hemisphere fall of 2011, 80 students were enrolled.

In addition, Jacinto City residents within the Houston Independent School District may apply to HISD early childhood programs. Only economically disadvantaged students, homeless students, students who are not proficient in English, or children of active-duty members of the U.S. military or whose parent has been killed, injured, or missing in action while on active duty may be enrolled in tuition-free HISD preschools. Students who are eligible for HISD's preschools may attend any Early Childhood Center in Houston ISD for free. Students not eligible may enroll in tuition-based HISD preschool programs. The Galena Park Independent School District operates the William F. "Bill" Becker Early Childhood Development Center, a preschool program for low income families, in Galena Park.

=== Colleges and universities ===
The pupils zoned to GPISD are served by San Jacinto College, while the students zoned to HISD are served by the Houston Community College System.

=== Public libraries ===
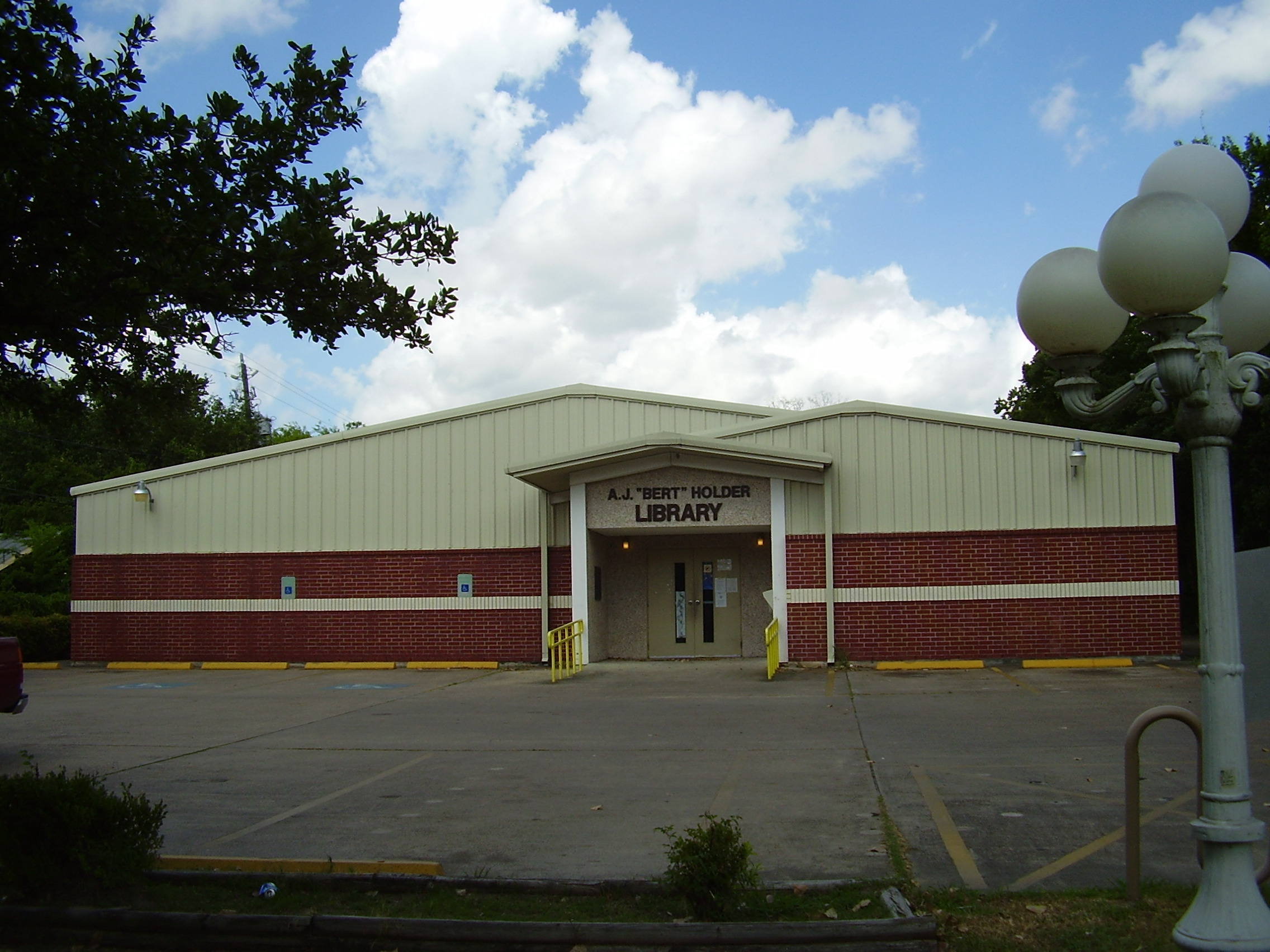
A. J. "Bert" Holder Memorial Library

The Harris County Public Library (HCPL) system operates the A. J. "Bert" Holder Memorial Library at 921 Akron Street across from Akron Park in Jacinto City. The first Jacinto City Public Library opened in 1958 on Mercury Drive; the building at one time functioned as Jacinto City's city hall. The current Jacinto City branch, named A. J. "Bert" Holder, opened in 1992. The branch is a partnership between HCPL and the city; the city built and maintains the 3,883-square-foot (360.7 m^{2}) building, while the county supplies materials and staff. The city and county held this agreement since 1957. The branch was named after Albert J. "Bert" Holder, who served as the mayor of Jacinto City.

=== Gallery of schools ===
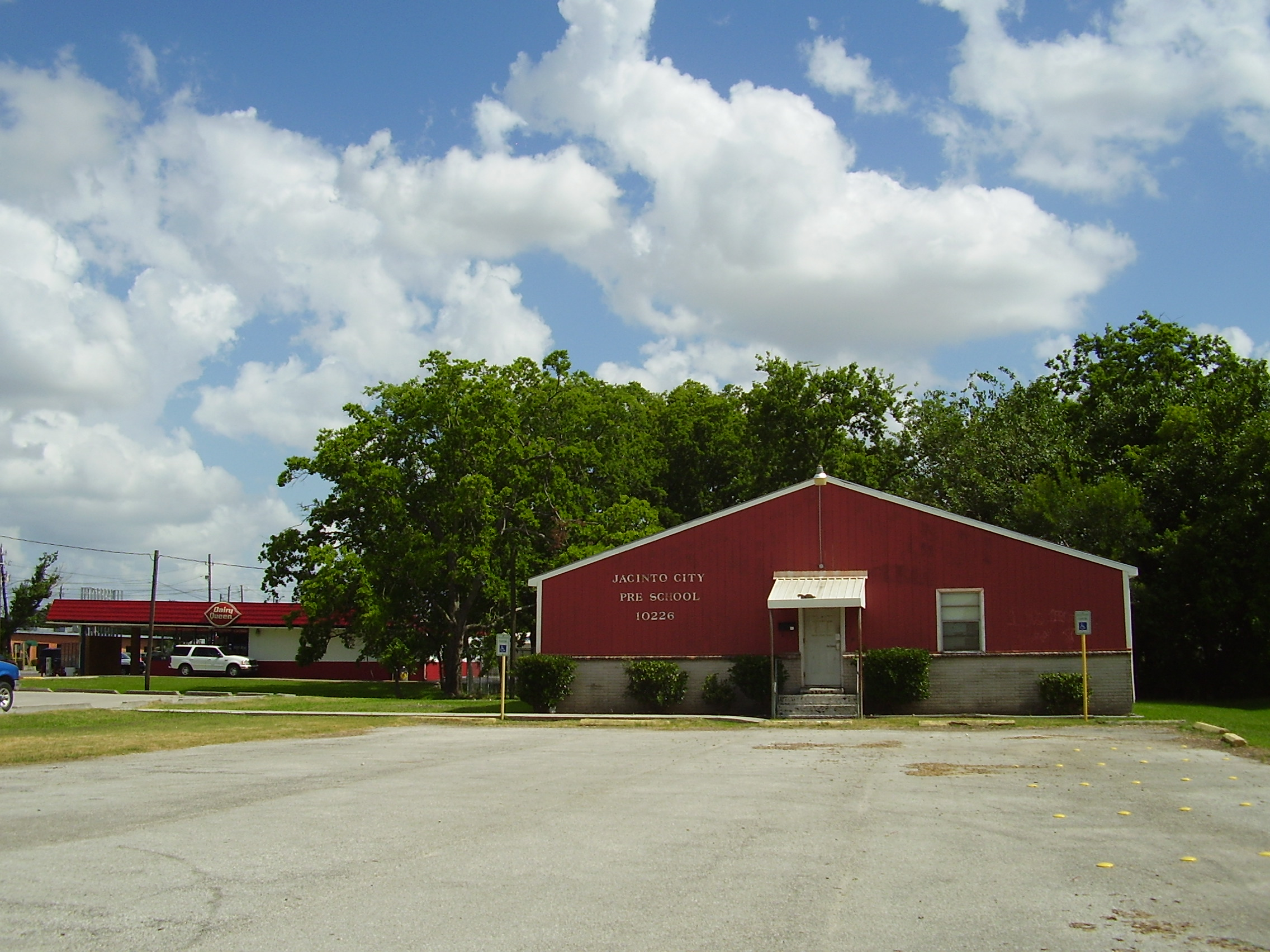
Former Jacinto City Preschool building

== Parks and recreation ==
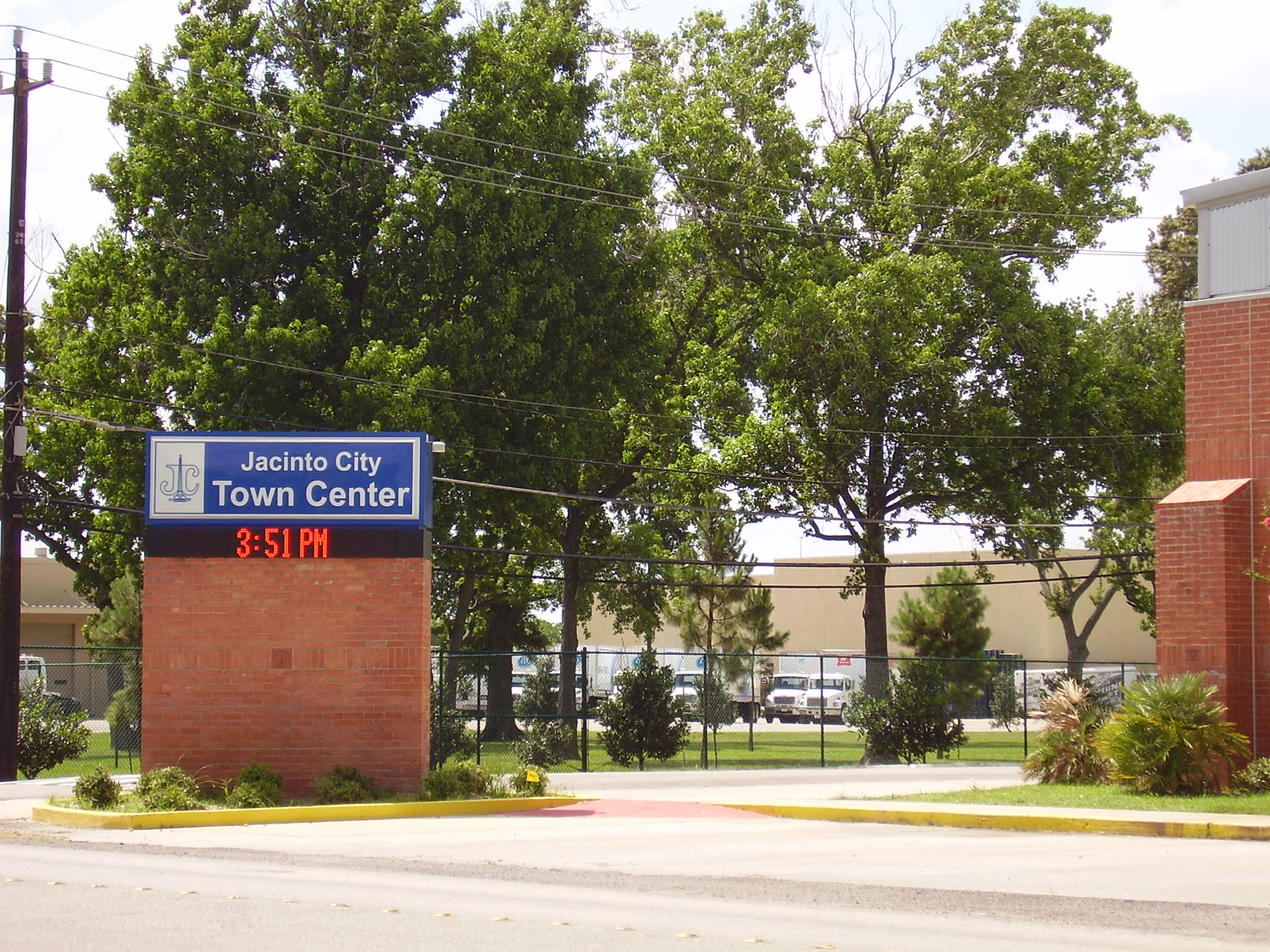
Jacinto City Town Center is a municipal complex containing recreation facilities and a preschool

The Jacinto City Department of Parks and Recreation maintains four parks, a swimming pool, a recreation center, and four ball fields. One of its facilities is the Milton Lusk Youth Activity Center.

The Jacinto City Town Center has several facilities, including a community center that may be rented by Jacinto City residents. Jacinto City operates the Heritage Hall, a recreational center for senior citizens of age 60 or older located in the same complex. It provides meals and activities. The center provides transportation to and from Jacinto City, Galena Park, and the Songwood community in Houston. Heritage Hall first opened in 1979.

A group of recreational facilities opened in the 1950s.

== Notable people ==
- Suzanne Basso, murderer
- Rodney Crowell, Singer and songwriter

== Gallery ==
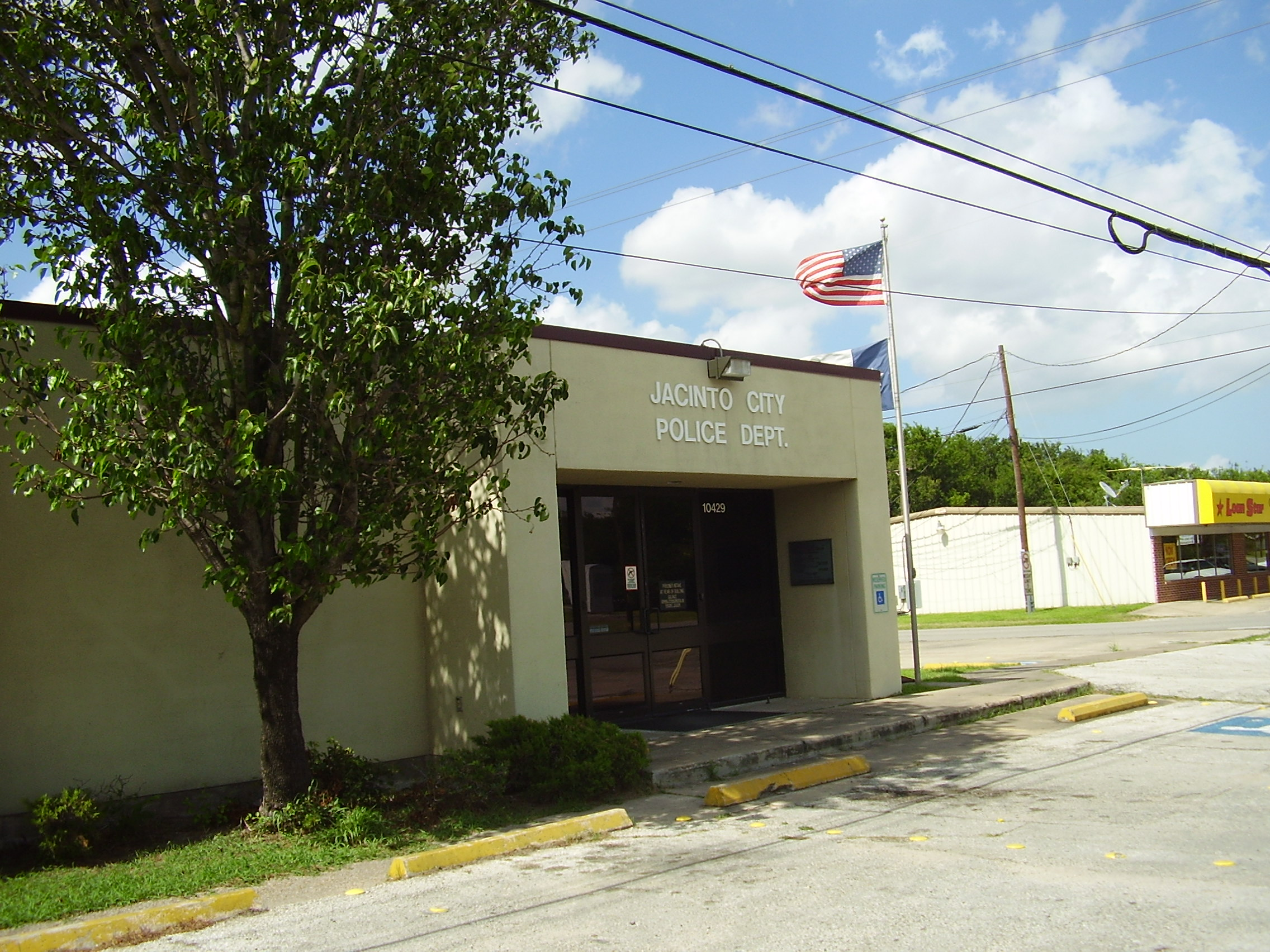
Jacinto City Police Department

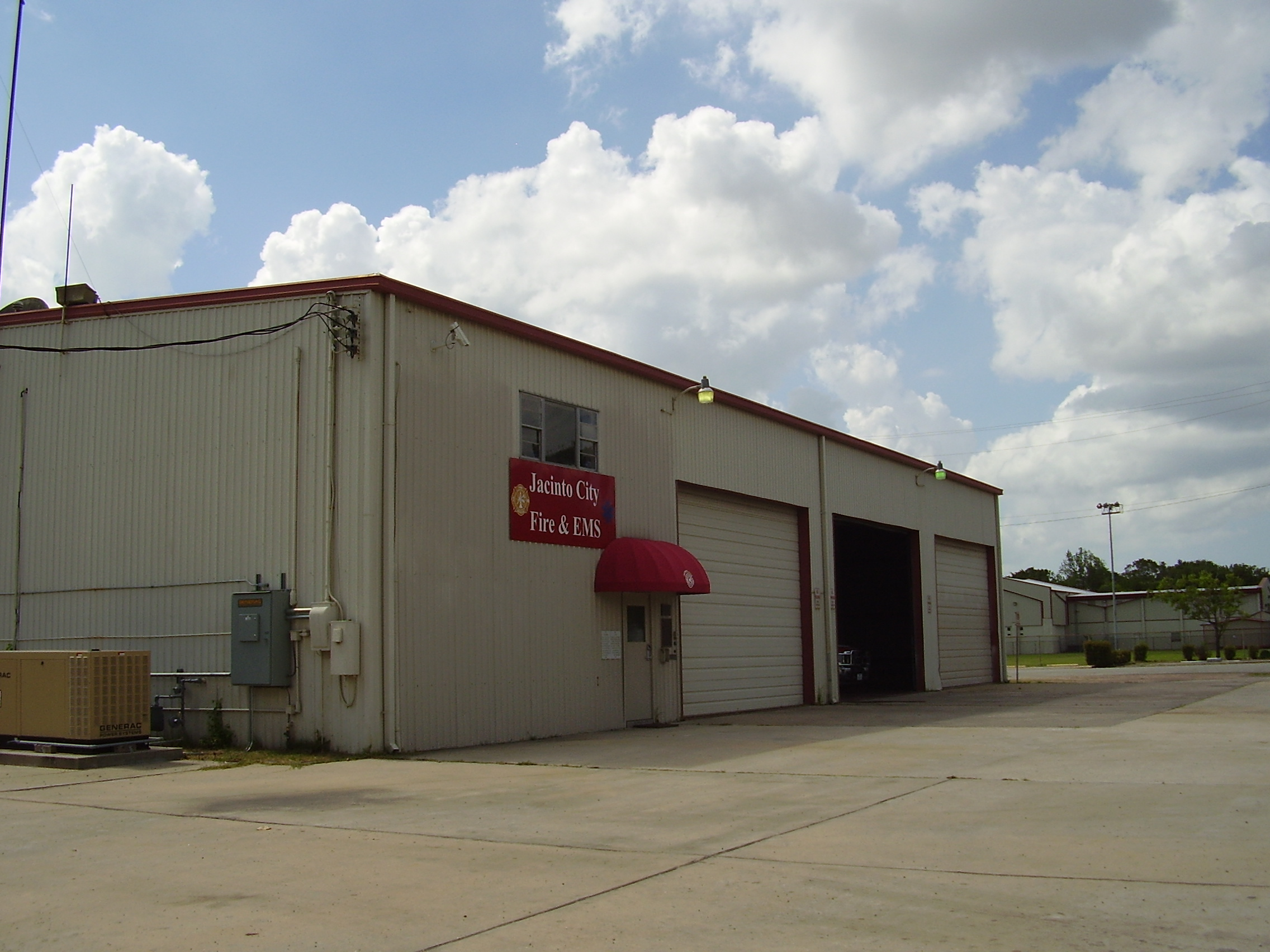
Jacinto City Fire Department and EMS
