= Howard T. Tellepsen =

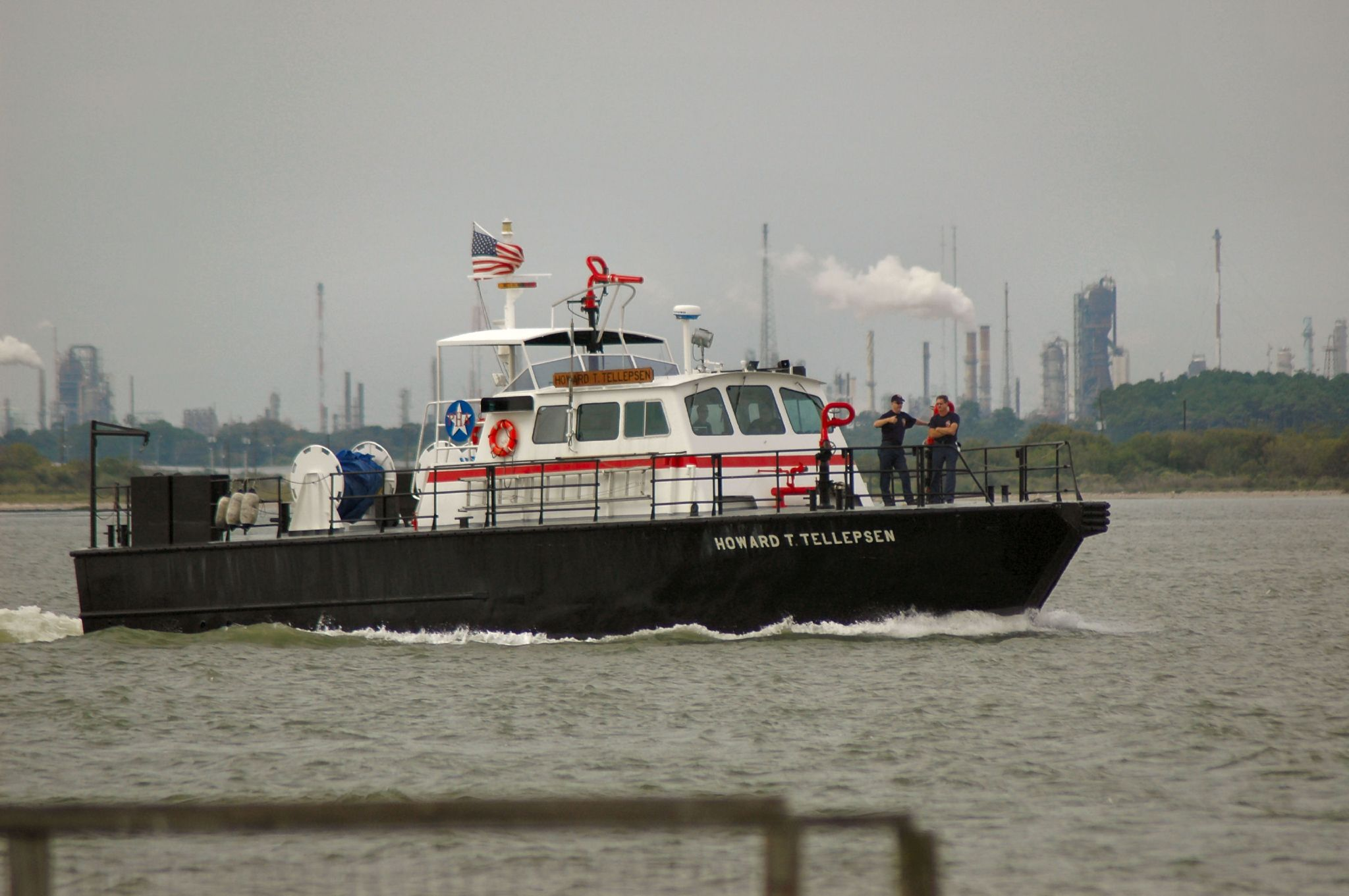
Fireboat Howard T. Tellepsen in the Houston Ship Channel.

The Howard T. Tellepsen was a fireboat operated by the Houston Port Authority from 1983 to 2014. She and her sister ship, the J.S. Bracewell, replaced the Port authority's second fireboat, the Captain Crotty, which had been in service since 1950. They joined the Captain J.L. Farnsworth, which had been in service since 1973.

The Port authority replaced the older vessels with three Metalcraft 70 fireboats, each of which was more powerful than the three retiring craft put together.

The vessel was named after a real estate developer who was appointed to the Port authority.
