= Captain Crotty =

Fireboat of Houston, Texas, United States

Captain Crotty was Houston, Texas's second fireboat. Commissioned in 1950, she replaced Port Houston. She was joined by Houston's third fireboat, Captain J.L. Farnsworth in 1973. In 1983, she was retired and replaced by J.S. Bracewell and Howard T. Tellepsen.

Captain Crotty was 79 feet (24 m) long, and built by R.T.C Shipbuilding of Camden, New Jersey. According to Motorboating magazine, she was "highly maneuverable" and built to a "relatively inexpensive" design. She was named after Charles Crotty, who had been assistant director of the port. The name was chosen through a contest. After her retirement, she was sold to Ocean Diving Adventures Incorporated for $50,000.
