= Cloverleaf, Texas =

Cloverleaf, Texas,
- Census-designated place
- Nickname: ESCL
- Location in Harris County and the state of Texas
- Coordinates: 29°47′5″N 95°10′23″W
- Country: United States
- State: Texas
- County: Harris

Area
  - Total: 3.3 sq mi (8.6 km^{2})
  - Land: 3.3 sq mi (8.6 km^{2})
  - Water: 0 sq mi (0.0 km^{2})
- Elevation: 26 ft (8 m)

Population (2020)
  - Total: 24,100
  - Density: 7,300/sq mi (2,800/km^{2})
- Time zone: UTC-6 (Central (CST))
  - Summer (DST): UTC-5 (CDT)
- ZIP code: 77015
- Area code: 713
- FIPS code: 48-15628
- GNIS feature ID: 1373144

Cloverleaf is a census-designated place (CDP) in east central Harris County, Texas, United States. The population was 24,100 at the 2020 census.

== History ==
Cloverleaf originated as a stop on the Beaumont, Sour Lake, and Western Railway. A 1936 county highway map indicates an unnamed development that became Cloverleaf. The Handbook of Texas states that a post office may have existed for a short period of time around 1950. In 1990, Cloverleaf had 18,230 residents and 18 churches.

== Geography ==
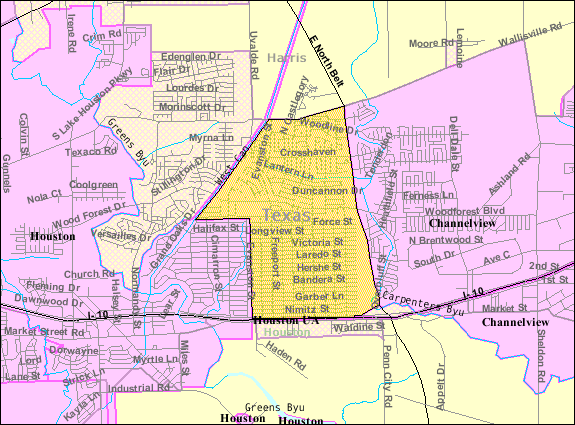
Map of Cloverleaf

Cloverleaf is located at 29°47′5″N 95°10′23″W (29.784676, -95.172959). The community is located between the city of Jacinto City and the Channelview CDP along Interstate 10.

According to the United States Census Bureau, the CDP has a total area of 3.3 square miles (8.6 km^{2}), all land.

== Demographics ==
Historical population
Census	Pop.	Note	%±
1980	17,317		—
1990	18,230		5.3%
2000	23,508		29.0%
2010	22,942		−2.4%
2020	24,100		5.0%
U.S. Decennial Census; 1850–1900 1910; 1920 1930 1940; 1950 1960 1970; 1980 1990 2000; 2010 2020

Cloverleaf first appeared as a census designated place in the 1980 United States census.

=== Racial and ethnic composition ===
Cloverleaf CDP, Texas – Racial and ethnic composition Note: the US Census treats Hispanic/Latino as an ethnic category. This table excludes Latinos from the racial categories and assigns them to a separate category. Hispanics/Latinos may be of any race.
Race / Ethnicity (NH = Non-Hispanic)	Pop 2000	Pop 2010	Pop 2020	% 2000	% 2010	% 2020
White alone (NH)	8,737	4,531	2,829	37.17%	19.75%	11.74%
Black or African American alone (NH)	3,726	2,310	2,132	15.85%	10.07%	8.85%
Native American or Alaska Native alone (NH)	55	32	40	0.23%	0.14%	0.17%
Asian alone (NH)	342	270	220	1.45%	1.18%	0.91%
Native Hawaiian or Pacific Islander alone (NH)	0	4	3	0.00%	0.02%	0.01%
Other race alone (NH)	12	31	44	0.05%	0.14%	0.18%
Mixed race or Multiracial (NH)	213	128	228	0.91%	0.56%	0.95%
Hispanic or Latino (any race)	10,423	15,636	18,604	44.34%	68.15%	77.20%
Total	23,508	22,942	24,100	100.00%	100.00%	100.00%

=== 2020 census ===
As of the 2020 census, 24,100 people, 7,095 households, and 5,743 families resided in the CDP.

The median age was 31.3 years. 30.6% of residents were under the age of 18 and 9.3% of residents were 65 years of age or older. For every 100 females there were 101.1 males, and for every 100 females age 18 and over there were 100.0 males age 18 and over.

100.0% of residents lived in urban areas, while 0.0% lived in rural areas.

Of these households, 47.4% had children under the age of 18 living in them. Of all households, 49.8% were married-couple households, 17.6% were households with a male householder and no spouse or partner present, and 24.3% were households with a female householder and no spouse or partner present. About 15.3% of all households were made up of individuals and 5.0% had someone living alone who was 65 years of age or older.

There were 7,585 housing units, of which 6.5% were vacant. The homeowner vacancy rate was 1.7% and the rental vacancy rate was 6.6%.

Racial composition as of the 2020 census
Race	Number	Percent
White	6,226	25.8%
Black or African American	2,243	9.3%
American Indian and Alaska Native	417	1.7%
Asian	238	1.0%
Native Hawaiian and Other Pacific Islander	6	0.0%
Some other race	7,949	33.0%
Two or more races	7,021	29.1%
Hispanic or Latino (of any race)	18,604	77.2%

In 2020, the median household income was $49,276.

=== 2000 census ===
At the 2000 census there were 23,508 people, 7,287 households, and 5,800 families in the CDP. The population density was 6,589.2 inhabitants per square mile (2,544.1/km^{2}). There were 7,865 housing units at an average density of 2,204.5 per square mile (851.2/km^{2}).

In 2000, the racial makeup of the CDP was 58.77% White, 16.11% African American, 0.59% Native American, 1.51% Asian, 0.05% Pacific Islander, 20.27% from other races, and 2.71% from two or more races. Hispanic or Latino of any race were 44.34%.

In 2000, the median household income was $37,449 and the median family income was $40,231. Males had a median income of $30,958 versus $25,044 for females. The per capita income for the CDP was $16,245. About 15.6% of families and 20.3% of the population were below the poverty line, including 26.8% of those under age 18 and 4.9% of those age 65 or over.

== Government and infrastructure ==
The Harris Health System (formerly Harris County Hospital District) designated the Settegast Health Center in southeast Houston for the ZIP code 77015. The designated public hospital is Lyndon B. Johnson General Hospital in northeast Houston.

== Education ==
Cloverleaf is zoned to schools in the Galena Park Independent School District.

Elementary schools in the Cloverleaf CDP include Cloverleaf Elementary School, Green Valley Elementary School, Havard Elementary School, Sam Houston Elementary School, and North Shore Elementary School. All residents are zoned to Cobb 6th Grade School, which is located outside the CDP. Most residents are zoned to North Shore Middle School, in the CDP, for grades 7 through 8; some residents are zoned to Cunningham Middle School, outside the CDP, instead. All residents are zoned to North Shore Senior High School for grades 9 through 12.

In 1990, Cloverleaf had two elementary schools, one junior high school, and one high school.

Residents of Galena Park ISD (and therefore Cloverleaf CDP) are zoned to San Jacinto College.

== See also ==
- Cloverleaf quasar
