= Galena Park Independent School District =

School district in Texas, United States

Coordinates: 29.7906°N 95.1596°W

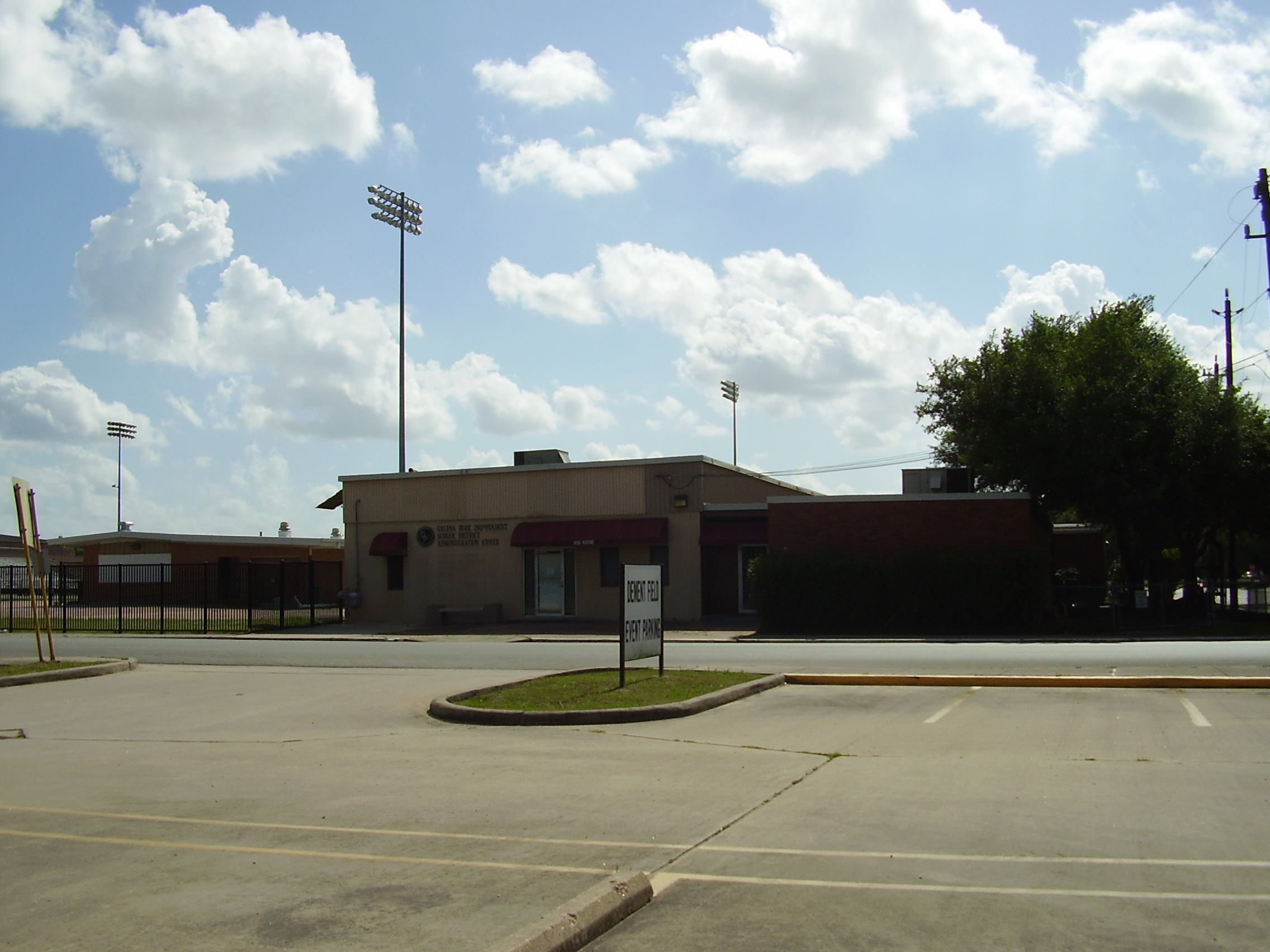
- Galena Park ISD Administration Annex in Galena Park

Address
- 14705 Woodforest Boulevard Houston, Texas, 77015; United States

District information
- Type: Public
- Grades: PreK–12
- NCES District ID: 4820250

Students and staff
- Students: 21,918 (2020–2021)
- Teachers: 1,404.4 (on an FTE basis)
- Staff: 1,821.29 (on an FTE basis)
- Student–teacher ratio: 15.61:1

Other information
- Website: www.galenaparkisd.com

Galena Park Independent School District is a school district based in the Channelview CDP of unincorporated Harris County, Texas, United States.

The district serves the city of Galena Park, about half of the city of Jacinto City, small portions of the city of Houston (including Fidelity and portions of the Northshore area), and unincorporated areas in Harris County (including the CDP of Cloverleaf and sections of the Channelview CDP).

In 2009, the school district was rated "recognized" by the Texas Education Agency.

== Headquarters ==
The district has its headquarters in a former Randall's building, located in the East Belt Shopping Center, a shopping center in the Channelview CDP of unincorporated Harris County, Texas, United States.

Previously the district headquarters were located in Galena Park.

== School uniforms ==
None of the schools have a specified dress code, though all schools, have a strict dress code policy.

== Schools ==
=== Secondary schools ===
==== High schools ====
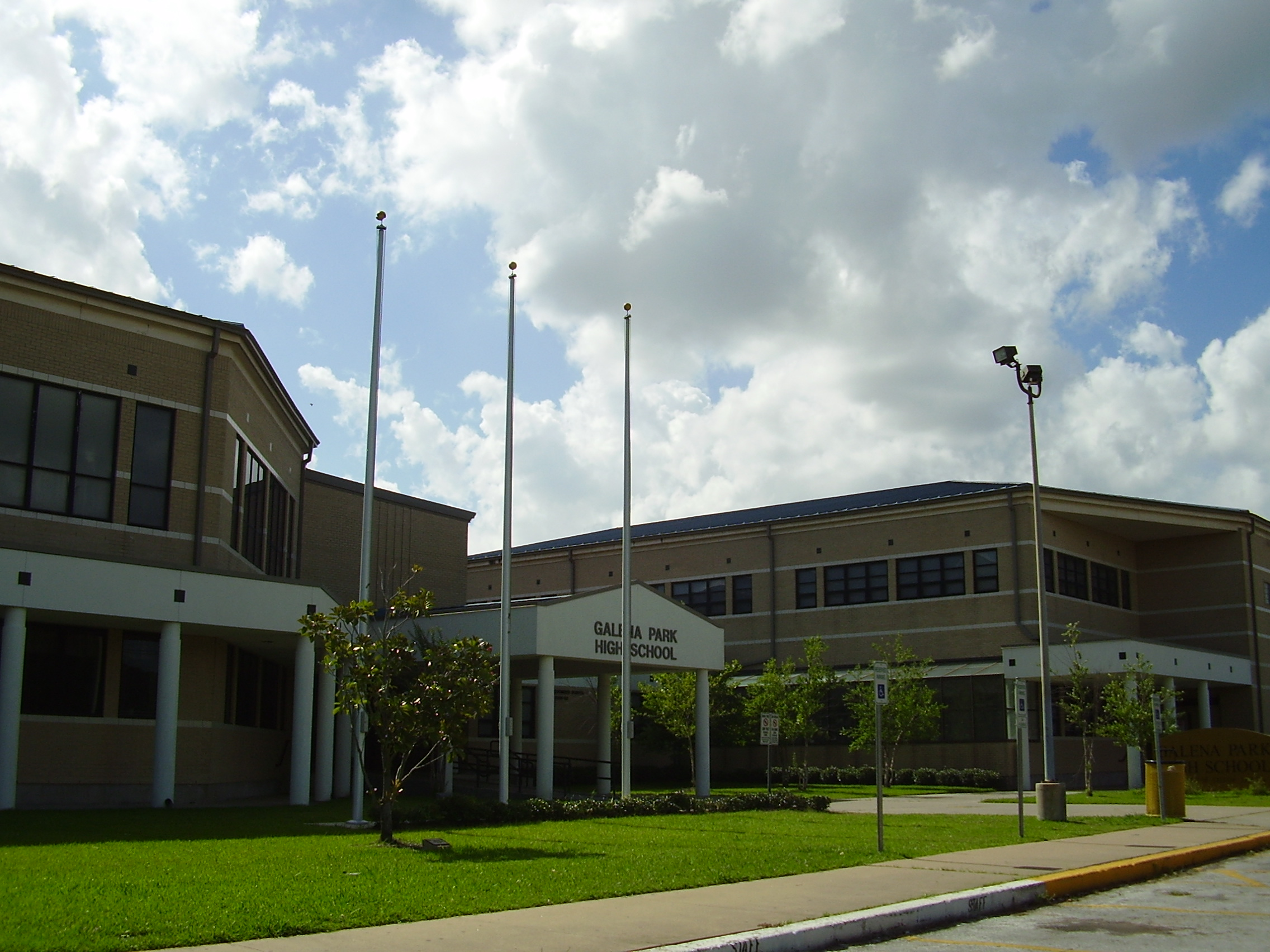
Galena Park High School

5A

- Galena Park High School (Galena Park)

6A

- North Shore Senior HS 9th Grade Center, North Shore 10th Grade Center, and North Shore Senior High School (Harris County) (Opened 1965 as 10-12, later became a 9-12, split into two campuses in 1999 reunited in 2003, the 9th Grade Center opened in 2008, and the 10th Grade Center opened in 2018)

Early College High School is a new program where the student's entire high school experience takes place at San Jacinto College. Successful students can graduate with an associate degree and their high school diploma or a technical certification and their high school diploma.

==== Middle schools ====
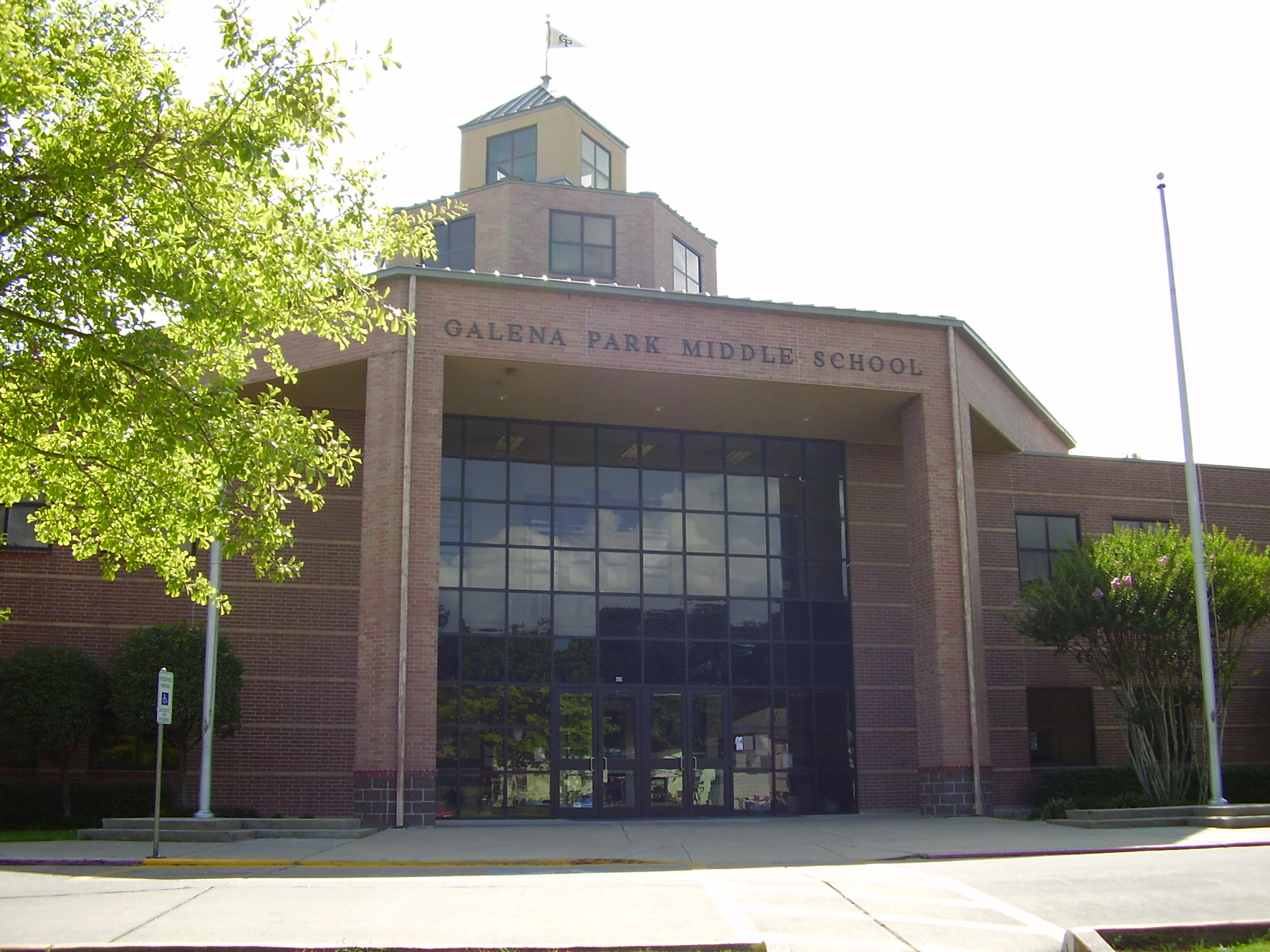
Galena Park Middle School

6-8

- Galena Park Middle School (Galena Park) (Opened 1949)
- Woodland Acres Middle School (Houston) (Opened 1947)

7-8

- Cunningham Middle School (unincorporated) (Opened 1982)
- North Shore Middle School (unincorporated) (Opened 1956)

==== 6th grade schools ====
- Gerald D. Cobb 6th Grade Campus (Harris County) (Opened 2000)

=== Primary schools ===
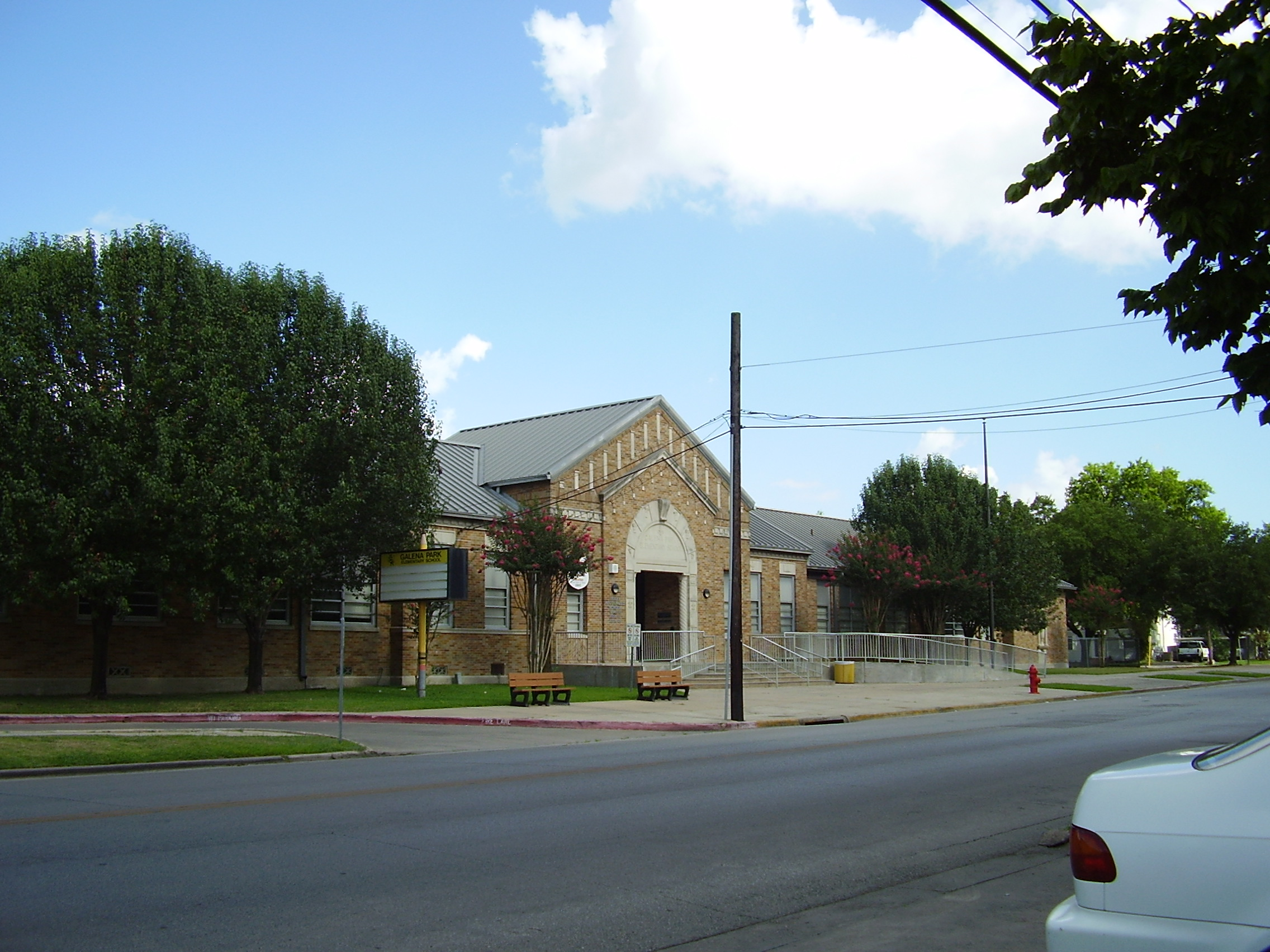
Galena Park Elementary School

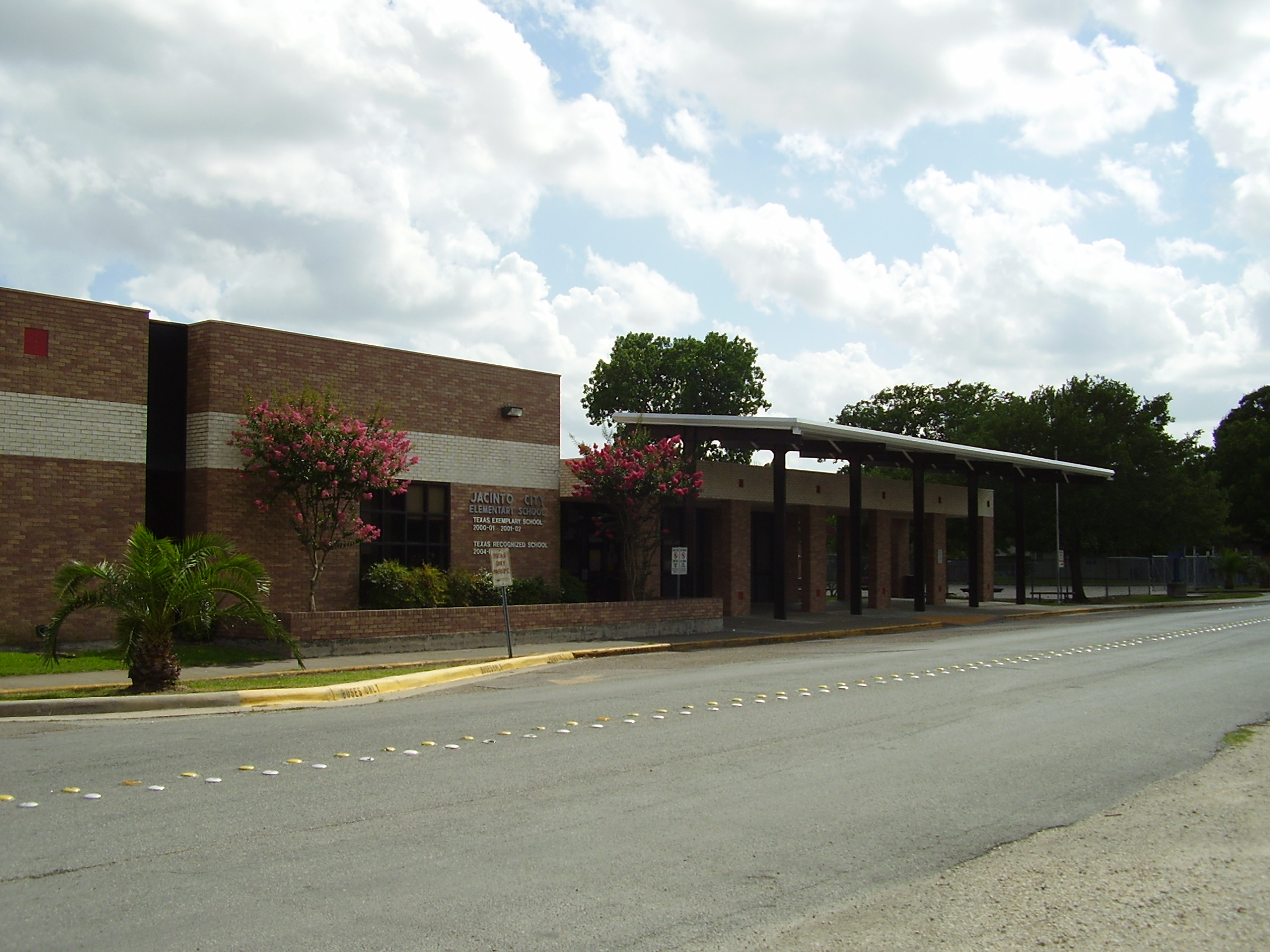
Jacinto City Elementary School

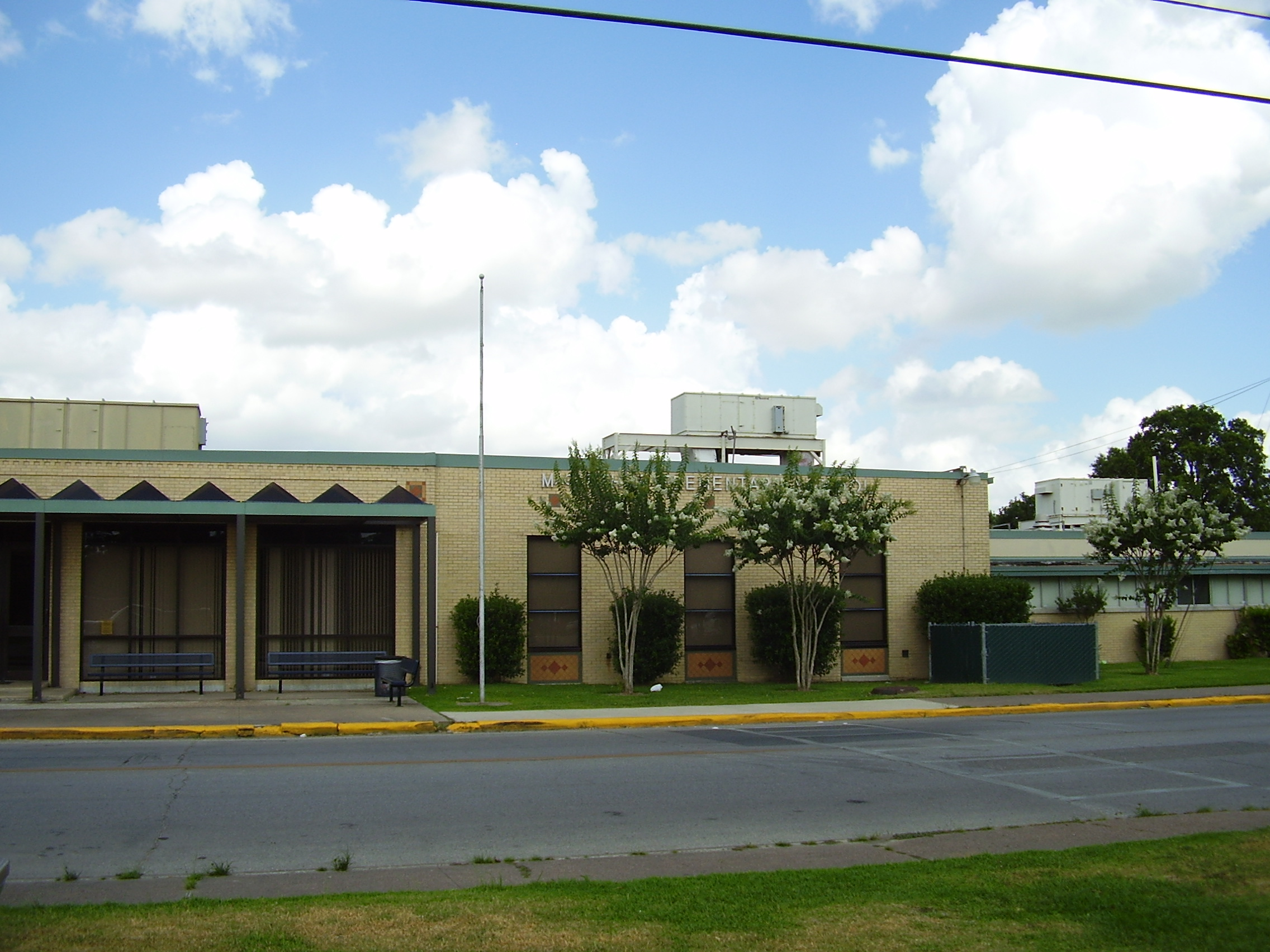
MacArthur Elementary School

- Cimarron Elementary School (Houston) (Opened 1954)
- Cloverleaf Elementary School (unincorporated) (Opened 1943)
- Galena Park Elementary School (Galena Park) (Opened 1937)
- Green Valley Elementary School (unincorporated) (Opened 1958)
- Sam Houston Elementary School (unincorporated) (Opened 2007)
- James B. Havard Elementary School (unincorporated) (Opened 1998)
- Jacinto City Elementary School (Jacinto City) (Opened 1944) (Older site at )
- Douglas MacArthur Elementary School (Galena Park) (Opened 1951)
- Normandy Crossing Elementary School (unincorporated) (Opened 2004)
- North Shore Elementary School (unincorporated) (Opened 1961)
- Purple Sage Elementary School (unincorporated) (Opened 1991)
- Pyburn Elementary School (Houston) (Opened 1952)
- Kenneth J. Tice Elementary School (unincorporated) (Opened 1979)
- Dr. Shirley J. Williamson Elementary School (unincorporated) (Opened 2005 as Freedom Elementary School) - Named after Shirley J. Neeley
- Woodland Acres Elementary School (Houston)

=== Early childhood centers ===
GPISD operates the William F. "Bill" Becker Early Childhood Development Center, a preschool program for low income families, in Galena Park.

== Former schools ==
- Fidelity Manor High School - A Black school (under segregation rules) that opened in 1955 and merged into the previously white Galena Park HS in 1970.
- Fidelity Elementary School

A Texas Historical Commission (THC) marker was erected in 2009. The Fidelity Manor Awareness Center commemorates the former schools.

== Other facilities ==
GPISD has an agriculture facility in the city limits of Galena Park. It also has GPISD Childcare Centers North and South; the north one is at North Shore Elementary School in Cloverleaf, and the south one is in Galena Park.

== Gallery ==
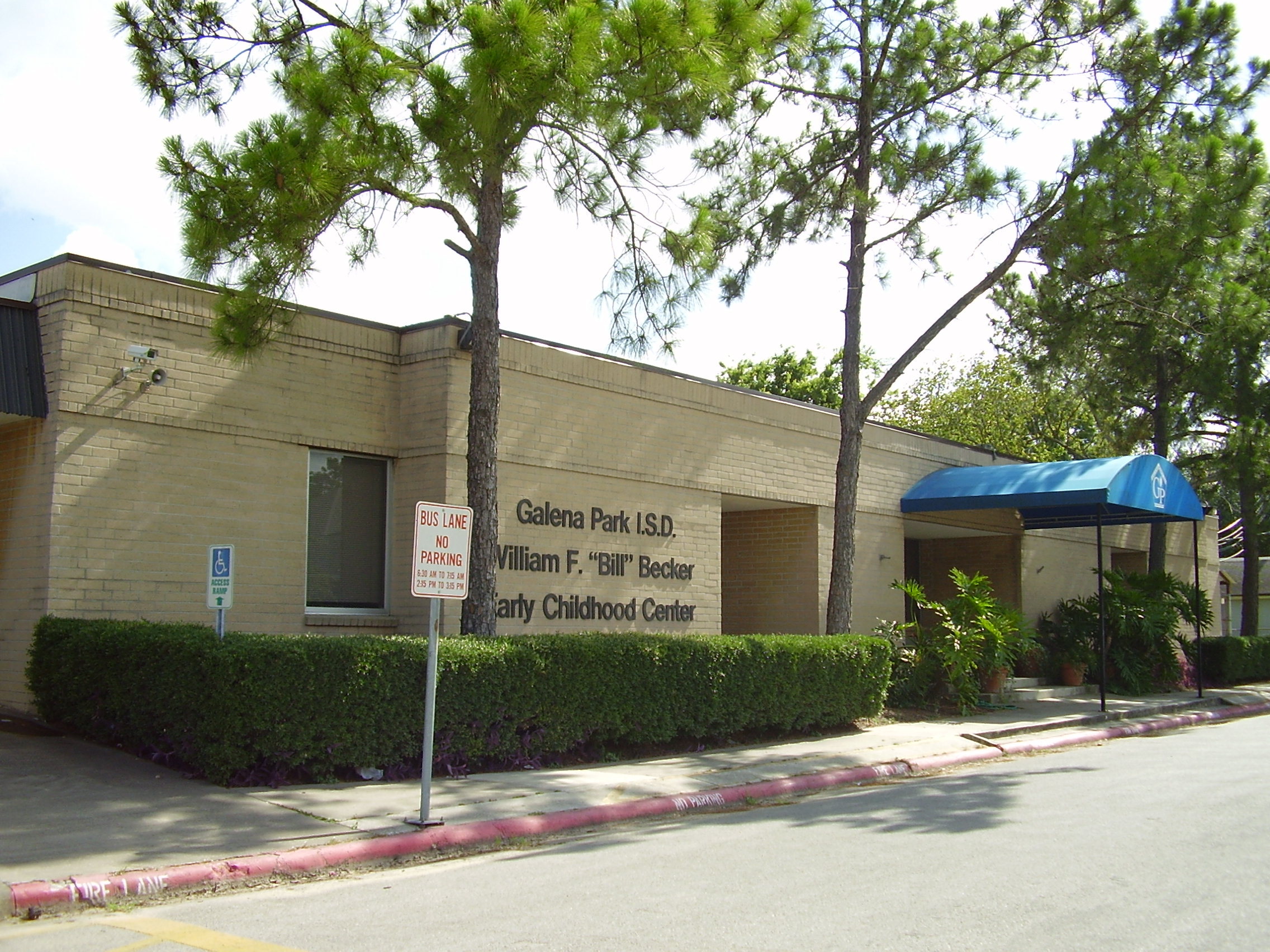
Becker Early Childhood Center
