= Galena Park High School =

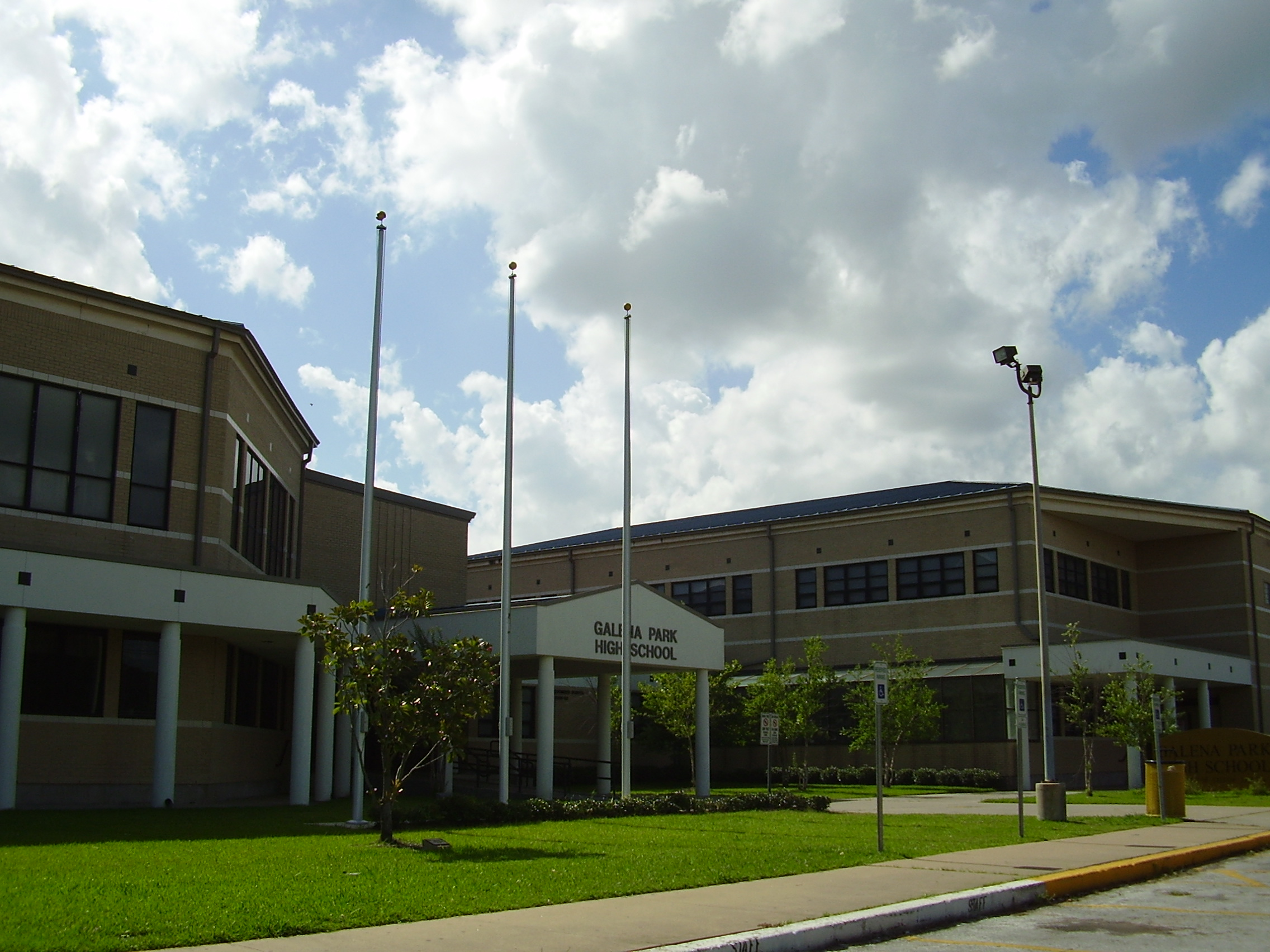
- Galena Park High School

Location
- 1000 Keene Street; Galena Park, Texas; Galena Park, Harris, Texas 77547; United States; 29.7396°N 95.2372°W

Information
- School type: Public School High School
- Established: 1928
- School district: Galena Park Independent School District
- Staff: 117.97 (FTE)
- Grades: 9-12
- Enrollment: 1,886 (2023-2024)
- Student to teacher ratio: 15.99
- Colours: Black and gold
- Slogan: Yellow Jacket Pride
- Athletics conference: UIL Class AAAAA
- Team name: Yellow Jackets
- Website: gphs.galenaparkisd.com

Galena Park High School is a secondary school located in Galena Park, Texas, United States and is one of three secondary schools in the Galena Park Independent School District (GPISD).

GPHS serves several areas: the city of Galena Park, the portion of Jacinto City south of Market Street, portions of Houston, and portions of unincorporated Harris County.

== Origins ==
The school was originally known as Clinton High School but changed its name to Galena Park High School (GPHS) in 1928 when the town of Clinton, Texas became incorporated as Galena Park, named for the Galena Oil Company. It was assimilated into the Galena Park Independent School District (GPISD) in 1930. In 1970, GPISD closed the doors of Fidelity Manor High School and integrated the African-American population of that school into the ranks of GPHS and its feeder schools.

== Campus ==
The school moved into its first permanent building in 1929 on the site of the current Galena Park Middle School (GPMS). That building became Galena Park Junior High until it was torn down to build the current GPMS. GPHS moved into its current location at 1000 Keene Street in Galena Park in March 1950. The 1,500-seat auditorium and the band and choir wings were added in 1953. A new wing on the north side of campus was built in 1956 adding a new gym and more classroom space. A new library was added in 1964 allowing for more classroom space and books. In 1994 a new library, front office, science wing and cafeteria were added during a major facelift of the school. During a 2004 construction the Arthur C. Lilly Center, the Johnnie Rountree Performing Arts Center and the new field house at Dement Field were all constructed and the entire school was given a facelift which included new dining areas and renovations in all three gymnasiums.

== Principals ==
Billy Bob Backer was the first principal from 1928 until 1930. Mr. A. T. Johnson served as principal from 1930 until 1933. Mr. Don Slocomb became principal in 1933 and remained until 1952. From 1942-1945 Harold Dement was the acting principal while Mr. Slocomb served in the armed forces during World War II. Mr. John W. Hoke became the longest serving principal of GPHS, serving from 1952 until 1977. In 1977 Mr. Wayne Lucky became the principal and in 1986 the school was again remodeled adding space to the growing school. In 1990 Mr. Bill Burnett became the Principal of GPHS and remained until 1993, when George Banda took over those duties. In 1998, Mr. Arnold Ramirez became the Principal of GPHS and remained until 2000, when he moved into the GPISD administration. In 2000, GPHS ushered in the 21st Century with its first female principal, Mrs. Marsha Masi. Mrs. Masi presided over another school remodeling. During the 2004 construction the Arthur C. Lilly Center, the Johnnie Rountree Fine Arts Center and the new field house at Dement Field were all constructed and the entire school was given a facelift which included new dining areas and renovations in all three gymnasiums. Mrs Masi implemented many new and innovative courses for the students of GPHS many of which offered student instruction in the career field of their choice. Students could receive college credit while still in high school. After 7 successful years for Mrs. Masi, Mr. Steven Kinney became principal for the 2007-2008 school year until he resigned due to illness in 2010 and was replaced by Tony Gardea, an alumnus of Galena Park High School.

== School Programs ==
The following programs are offered at GPHS:

=== Jacket Athletics ===
- Baseball- 2003 & 2006 Varsity District Championship
- Basketball
- Football
- Golf
- Swimming
- Soccer
- Tennis
- Track

=== Lady Jacket Athletics ===
- Basketball
- Bowling
- Cross Country
- Fútbol (Soccer)
- Golf
- Softball
- Swim Team
- Track
- Tennis
- Volleyball

=== Band ===
- The Band of Gold (Marching & Concert Band)

Choir

- Treble Choir
- Men's Choir
- Concert Choir
- Vocal Ensemble
- Varsity Women's Choir
- Varsity Men's Choir
- Chorale

=== Career and Technology Programs ===
- Auto Technology
- BPA Business Professionals
- Cosmetology
- Criminal Justice
- Culinary Arts
- DECA
- Electronics
- FCCLA
- FCCLA / HERO
- HOSA Health Professions
- National FFA Organization
- National Technical Honor Society
- Professional Communications
- Robotics Team
- TAFE (Future Teachers)
- VICA Vocational/Industrial
- Welding

=== Clubs ===
- Academic Decathlon
- Advisory Board
- JROTC
- Art Club
- Athletic Trainers
- Ballet Folklorico
- Best Buddies
- Cheerleading
- Debate Team
- Drawing Club
- Drama & Thespian Society
- FBLA (Future Business Leaders of America)
- FCA / Youth For Christ
- FFA- Future Farmers of America
- Freestyle Crew (Dance)
- Gents 1964
- Madamoiselles
- Geography Bee
- Hi-Y & Sweethearts
- Interact
- International Club
- Link Crew
- LULAC
- Mariachi Band
- Math Honor Society
- Mu Alpha Theta Fraternity
- National Forensic League Speech and Debate Honor Society
- National Honor Society
- PALs Peer Assistance Leaders (deactivated-2008)
- PRIDE Team
- Quill & Scroll (Honor Society)
- SADD
- Science Club
- Spanish Club
- Speech and Debate Team
- Student Council
- Texas Future Music Educators
- UIL Academic Teams
