= Port Houston (fireboat) =

The Port Houston, commissioned in 1926, was the first fireboat to serve the Houston area. She was replaced by the Captain Crotty in 1950.

According to the Transactions of The Society of Naval Architects and Marine Engineers, the Port Houston was the world's first diesel-electric fireboat.
