= Clinton Park =

Clinton Park may refer to the following places in the United States:

- Clinton Park, Houston, a neighborhood in Houston
- Clinton Park, a public park in Houston
- Clinton Park (Portland, Oregon)
- DeWitt Clinton Park, a public park in Manhattan, New York
