= Michael Glyn Brown =

American surgeon

Michael Glyn Brown (January 18, 1957 – November 8, 2013) was a hand surgeon from Greater Houston, Texas. He owned the Brown Hand Center and also owned, managed, or was an officer in other medical centers. He became well known in Texas and elsewhere for his advertising and his social connections, but became involved in scandals and lost his medical license. He committed suicide in 2013.

== Early life and education ==
Brown was born in Galena Park in the Greater Houston area. While attending Galena Park Junior High School, he saw a film of Michael DeBakey performing heart surgery. He wanted to be a heart surgeon, but he said that he ultimately became a hand surgeon because the specialty allowed for greater creativity and was "more profitable and glamorous".

After graduating from Galena Park High School with honors in 1975, he attended the Southwest Texas State University (now Texas State University–San Marcos), where he received a grade point average of 3.97. He then graduated from the Baylor College of Medicine. He received his medical license in 1983 and did surgical training in a hospital in Stockton, California.

== Career ==
In 1988 he founded the Brown Hand Center. He also owned, managed, or was an officer in several other medical businesses, including the St. Michael's Center for Speciality Surgery with locations in three states, the Achilles Foot and Ankle Specialists, LLC, and the Allied Center for Special Surgery. He became well known in Houston for television advertisements showing him with Sophie, his baby daughter, which ended with the slogan, "In the Brown Hand Center, we'll care for you just as I care for my own family." The same advertisements also aired in Greater Phoenix.

By the early 21st century, Brown was making $2.5 million annually. He had a residence in the East Wedgwood Glen section of The Woodlands and a mansion in the Memorial area of Houston. At his death he also owned a mansion in Miami Beach, Florida, a ranch in Normangee, and a residence in New York. As of 2010 the Brown Hand Center had locations in Houston, Dallas, Austin, Las Vegas, and Phoenix, and Brown's businesses were expected to gross about $45 million in the next year, more than in the previous five years. Brown was also prominent in Houston society. In 2008, despite being already involved in scandals, he was awarded the Republican Congressional Medal of Distinction and in connection with the award had dinner with President George W. Bush and lunch with Vice President Dick Cheney. In 2010, he threw the first pitch at a Houston Astros game."

Brown advertised the "patented Brown technique" of carpal tunnel surgery, an endoscopic surgery for the wrist; the Brown Hand Center advertisements and website credited him with inventing the technique and contrasted it with more traditional surgery, which requires stitches. In 2010 Dr. Robert Szabo, the president of the American Society for Surgery of the Hand and the chief hand surgeon of the University of California-Davis School of Medicine, told Todd Ackermann of the Houston Chronicle that Brown's business had "nothing unique ... in regards to the surgeries they perform or helping hand patients generally"; according to Szabo and other orthopedic surgeons, Brown's claim to a special technique rested on his having patented his own surgical instruments, which resembled those used by other hand surgeons.

== Personal life and downfall ==
Brown was married four times. In 2002, he was convicted of beating his third wife and was placed on probation by the Texas Medical Board for that and for "concerns he had an alcohol or chemical dependency". In 2006, after Brown tested positive for cocaine, the Board revoked his license to practice medicine. As of 2010, advertising for the Brown Hand Center promoted Brown's medical background, mentioned his medical degree, and stated that he was retired but trained the doctors who worked at the centers. Seth Chandler, a University of Houston professor of law, called the ads "misleading" but "[not] a slam dunk for anyone looking to prosecute" under the Texas Medical Practice Act.

In August 2010, Brown voluntarily forfeited parental rights to his two children by his third wife; in September 2011, after a week-long trial, he was acquitted of felony assault on his fourth wife.

The revenues of the Brown Hand Center decreased after advertisements featuring Brown ended circulation. Brown moved to Greater Miami and on January 23, 2013, filed a Chapter 11 bankruptcy petition in the United States Bankruptcy Court for the Southern District of Florida; the case was transferred to the U.S. Bankruptcy Court in Houston on September 25, 2013, and the appointment of a Chapter 11 Trustee was approved on September 30. A restructuring officer was named for Brown's businesses in March.

In July 2013, Brown pleaded guilty in federal court to interfering with a flight attendant. On September 25, he was sentenced to 30 days of federal jail and was ordered to surrender himself on October 25 of that year.

In October 2013 the Brown Hand Center announced it was closing. By October 16, only the Houston location remained open. The trustee handling Brown's bankruptcy case had placed the business in Chapter 11 protection; he stated that he had discovered "significant financial debt, misuse of revenue, and compliance issues".

=== Suicide attempt and death ===
On October 29, 2013, news was released that Brown had been found unconscious at his house in Miami Beach. His attorneys filed a statement with the U.S. Bankruptcy Court confirming that he had suffered cardiac arrest and was incapacitated: "Dr. Brown remains hospitalized ... The extent of the damage he has suffered is unknown; however, it appears to be severe and, at this time, counsel has no ability to communicate with Dr. Brown." He had been found, with a suicide note, on October 24, 2013.

Brown was taken to the Mount Sinai Medical Center & Miami Heart Institute in Miami Beach, where on November 7 he was declared brain dead and according to Dick DeGuerin, his attorney, life support was removed; he died the following day at the age of 56.

Prior to his death several of Michael Brown's assets, including briefcases containing $3.2 million in cash, art and antiques, and a $250,000 item of jewelry were reported missing and unaccounted for. After his death a series of auctions of his possessions were held to pay debts.
