= Galena Park, Texas =

- City
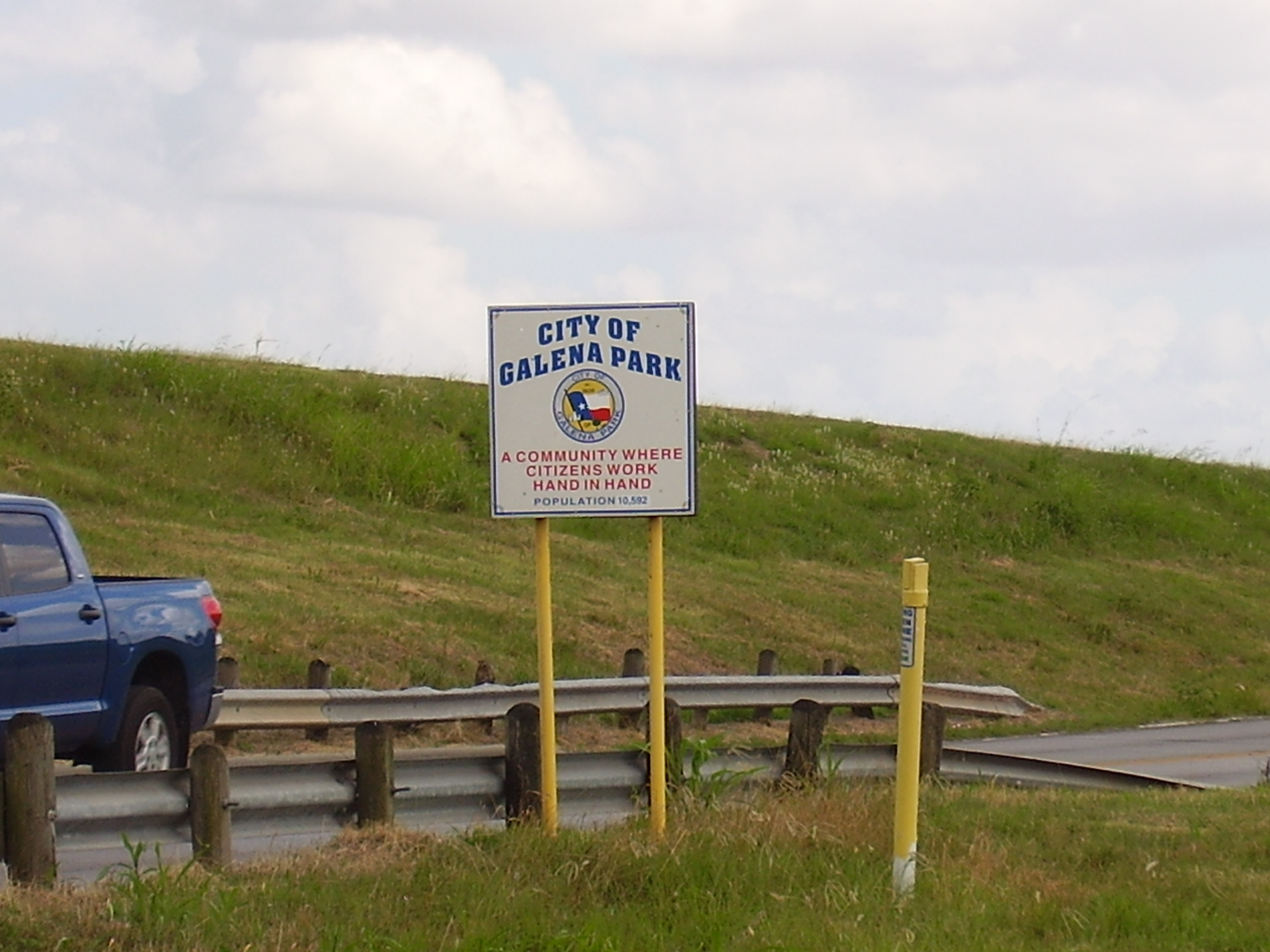
- Galena Park sign

- Location in Harris County and the state of Texas
- Coordinates: 29°44′20″N 95°14′14″W
- Country: United States
- State: Texas
- County: Harris

Area
  - Total: 4.92 sq mi (12.74 km^{2})
  - Land: 4.80 sq mi (12.44 km^{2})
  - Water: 0.12 sq mi (0.30 km^{2})
- Elevation: 7 ft (2.1 m)

Population (2020)
  - Total: 10,740
  - Density: 2,239.3/sq mi (864.58/km^{2})
- Time zone: UTC-6 (CST)
  - Summer (DST): UTC-5 (CDT)
- ZIP code: 77547
- Area codes: 713/281/832/346/621
- FIPS code: 48-27996
- GNIS feature ID: 1377177
- Website: www.cityofgalenapark-tx.gov

Galena Park is a city in Harris County, Texas, United States, within the Houston–Pasadena–The Woodlands metropolitan area. The population was 10,740 at the 2020 census. The population is predominantly Hispanic.

== History ==
The area was first settled by Ezekiel Thomas in 1824, whom had received a land grant from the Mexican government. After Thomas's death, his family sold the land to Isaac Batterson's family who moved into the area in 1833. The area of Galena Park began as the settlement of Clinton in 1835. The center of what would become Galena Park was a 1,000-acre (400 ha) tract that Batterson purchased from the estate of Ezekiel Thomas. The settlement originally served as a farming and ranching community, but in the 1880s transformed into a railroad center along the new Port of Houston. With the coming of the petrochemical industry in the early 1900s, Clinton again transformed into a refinery center.

Clinton attempted to establish a post office in 1935, but the request was denied, as another Clinton, Texas, had established the name. The settlement's name was changed to Galena Park after the Galena Signal Oil Company of Texas, which built the first refinery there. Galena Park's original name survives today as the name of a major street in the city, Clinton Drive. Because of the 1935 incorporation, Houston did not incorporate Galena Park's territory into its city limits, while Houston annexed surrounding areas that were unincorporated. By the late 1930s Houston was growing as a port, so Galena Park expanded. Since the 1940s, area residents considered the city to be a part of greater Houston.

The economy of Galena Park began to suffer in the early 1980s, when cranes used to haul ship cargo were reduced; prior to the early 1980s, a team of workers, known on the docks as longshoremen, took up to one week to unload cargo off a ship. Many lived in the Galena Park area and contributed to its local economy. The use of cranes, however, led to ships unloading all cargo in less than one day. The 1980s also hit Galena Park's economy with layoffs from the steel mills as the U.S. steel contracted due to overseas competition. The economy further decreased after the September 11 attacks, when seaport administrators tightened security rules that governed whether sailors could leave ships docked at port.

== Geography ==
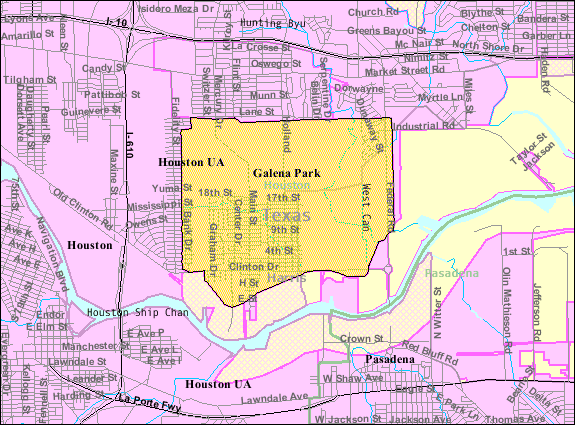
Map of Galena Park

Galena Park is located at 29°44′20″N 95°14′14″W (29.738928, –95.237211).

According to the United States Census Bureau, the city has a total area of 5.0 square miles (13 km^{2}), all land.

The city is east of the 610 Loop, north of the Houston Ship Channel, and adjacent to the City of Jacinto City, as well as the Clinton Park neighborhood of Houston. Clinton Drive is the main arterial road for Galena Park and traffic to and from the ship channel and the Port of Houston uses this road. The area around Galena Park includes freeways, freight railway, and heavy industry.

The border between Galena Park, previously an all-white city and Clinton Park, an African-American neighborhood, was barricaded as of 2008. Rafael Longoria and Susan Rogers of the Rice Design Alliance said in 2008 that the barricade "provides a stark example of how the prevailing segregationist sentiments of the era [are] still in evidence."

== Demographics ==
Historical population
Census	Pop.	Note	%±
1940	1,562		—
1950	7,186		360.1%
1960	10,852		51.0%
1970	10,479		−3.4%
1980	9,879		−5.7%
1990	10,033		1.6%
2000	10,592		5.6%
2010	10,887		2.8%
2020	10,740		−1.4%
U.S. Decennial Census; 1850–1900 1910; 1920 1930 1940; 1950 1960 1970; 1980 1990 2000; 2010

=== Racial and ethnic composition ===
Galena Park city, Texas – Racial and ethnic composition Note: the US Census treats Hispanic/Latino as an ethnic category. This table excludes Latinos from the racial categories and assigns them to a separate category. Hispanics/Latinos may be of any race.
Race / Ethnicity (NH = Non-Hispanic)	Pop 2000	Pop 2010	Pop 2020	% 2000	% 2010	% 2020
White alone (NH)	2,347	1,240	856	22.16%	11.39%	7.97%
Black or African American alone (NH)	803	719	622	7.58%	6.60%	5.79%
Native American or Alaska Native alone (NH)	22	13	12	0.21%	0.12%	0.11%
Asian alone (NH)	29	10	9	0.27%	0.09%	0.08%
Native Hawaiian or Pacific Islander alone (NH)	1	1	2	0.01%	0.01%	0.02%
Other race alone (NH)	4	17	31	0.04%	0.16%	0.29%
Mixed race or Multiracial (NH)	43	27	71	0.41%	0.25%	0.66%
Hispanic or Latino (any race)	7,343	8,860	9,137	69.33%	81.38%	85.07%
Total	10,592	10,887	10,740	100.00%	100.00%	100.00%

=== 2020 census ===
As of the 2020 census, Galena Park had a population of 10,740, 3,112 households, and 2,481 families. The median age was 31.3 years. 29.6% of residents were under the age of 18 and 10.3% of residents were 65 years of age or older. For every 100 females there were 103.1 males, and for every 100 females age 18 and over there were 101.8 males age 18 and over.

100.0% of residents lived in urban areas, while 0.0% lived in rural areas.

There were 3,112 households in Galena Park, of which 48.8% had children under the age of 18 living in them. Of all households, 51.8% were married-couple households, 18.3% were households with a male householder and no spouse or partner present, and 24.0% were households with a female householder and no spouse or partner present. About 15.3% of all households were made up of individuals and 5.7% had someone living alone who was 65 years of age or older.

There were 3,299 housing units, of which 5.7% were vacant. The homeowner vacancy rate was 0.8% and the rental vacancy rate was 6.3%.

Racial composition as of the 2020 census
Race	Number	Percent
White	3,244	30.2%
Black or African American	660	6.1%
American Indian and Alaska Native	160	1.5%
Asian	15	0.1%
Native Hawaiian and Other Pacific Islander	2	0.0%
Some other race	3,630	33.8%
Two or more races	3,029	28.2%
Hispanic or Latino (of any race)	9,137	85.1%

=== 2010 census ===
As of the census of 2010, 10,887 people and 3,021 households resided in the city. The population density was 2,183.3 inhabitants per square mile (843.0/km^{2}). The 3,273 housing units had an average density of 654.6 per square mile (252.7/km^{2}). The racial makeup of the city was 11.4% White, not Hispanic, 6.6% African American, not Hispanic, 0.13% Native American or Native Alaskan, not Hispanic, 0.09% Asian or Pacific Islander, 0.16% from other races, not Hispanic, and 0.25% from two or more races. People of Hispanic, Latino, or Spanish origin of any race were 81.4% of the population, a 21% increase over the 2000 census.

=== 2000 census ===
As of the 2000 census, of the 3,054 households, 46.9% had children under 18 living with them, 61.9% were married couples living together, 13.3% had a female householder with no husband present, and 19.4% were not families. About 17.0% of all households were made up of individuals, and 8.8% had someone living alone who was 65 or older. The average household size was 3.47, and the average family size was 3.92.

In the city, the age distribution was 33.8% under 18, 11.4% from 18 to 24, 28.6% from 25 to 44, 16.2% from 45 to 64, and 9.9% who were 65 or older. The median age was 28 years. For every 100 females, there were 99.1 males. For every 100 females 18 and over, there were 98.5 males.

The median income for a household in the city was $31,660, and for a family was $34,702. Males had a median income of $29,814 versus $21,172 for females. The per capita income for the city was $12,207. About 21.5% of families and 25.4% of the population were below the poverty line, including 34.2% of those under 18 and 10.6% of those 65 or over.

== Government and infrastructure ==
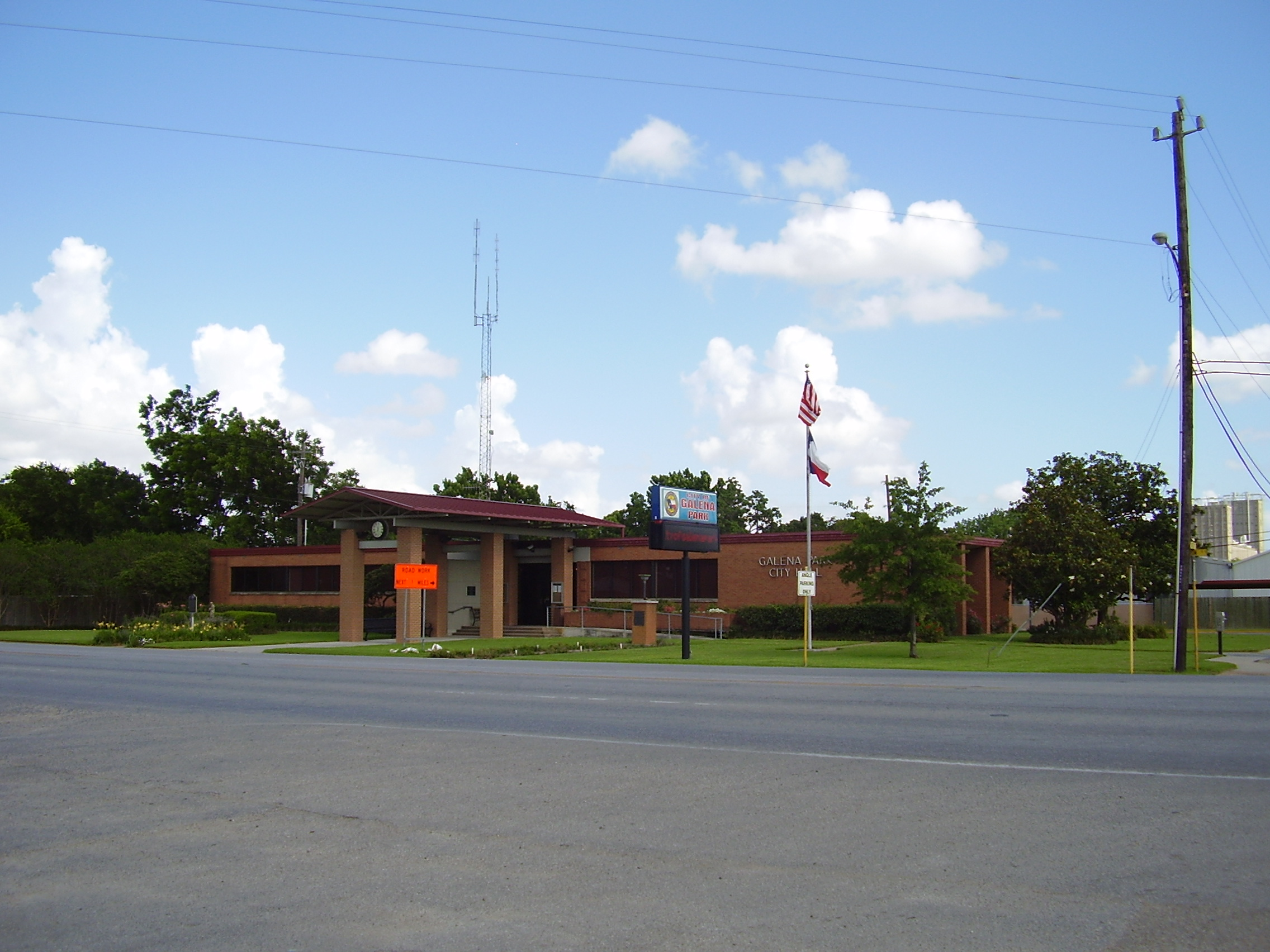
Galena Park City Hall

As of May 2nd 2026, Oscar Mireles is the mayor of the City of Galena Park. Mayor Mireles also serves as the chief executive officer of the city, as the city's chief administrator and official representative.

The City of Galena Park operates with a mayor-council type of government. The city council has four positions, with each having a responsibility for a particular municipal department.

The Galena Park Fire Department and the Galena Park Police Department serve the citizens of the city.

=== County, federal, and state representation ===
Galena Park is located within Harris County Precinct 2; as of 2011, Jack Morman headed Precinct 2.

Galena Park is located in District 143 of the Texas House of Representatives As of 2011, Ana Hernandez Luna represented the district. Galena Park is within District 6 of the Texas Senate; as of 2011, Mario Gallegos, Jr. was the representative.

Galena Park was within Texas's 29th congressional district; as of 2019, Sylvia Garcia represented the district. The United States Postal Service operates the Galena Park Post Office at 1805 Clinton Drive.

The designated public health center of the Harris Health System (formerly Harris County Health System) is the Strawberry Health Clinic in Pasadena. The nearest public hospital is Ben Taub General Hospital in the Texas Medical Center, Houston.

== Education ==
=== Primary and secondary schools ===
==== Public schools ====
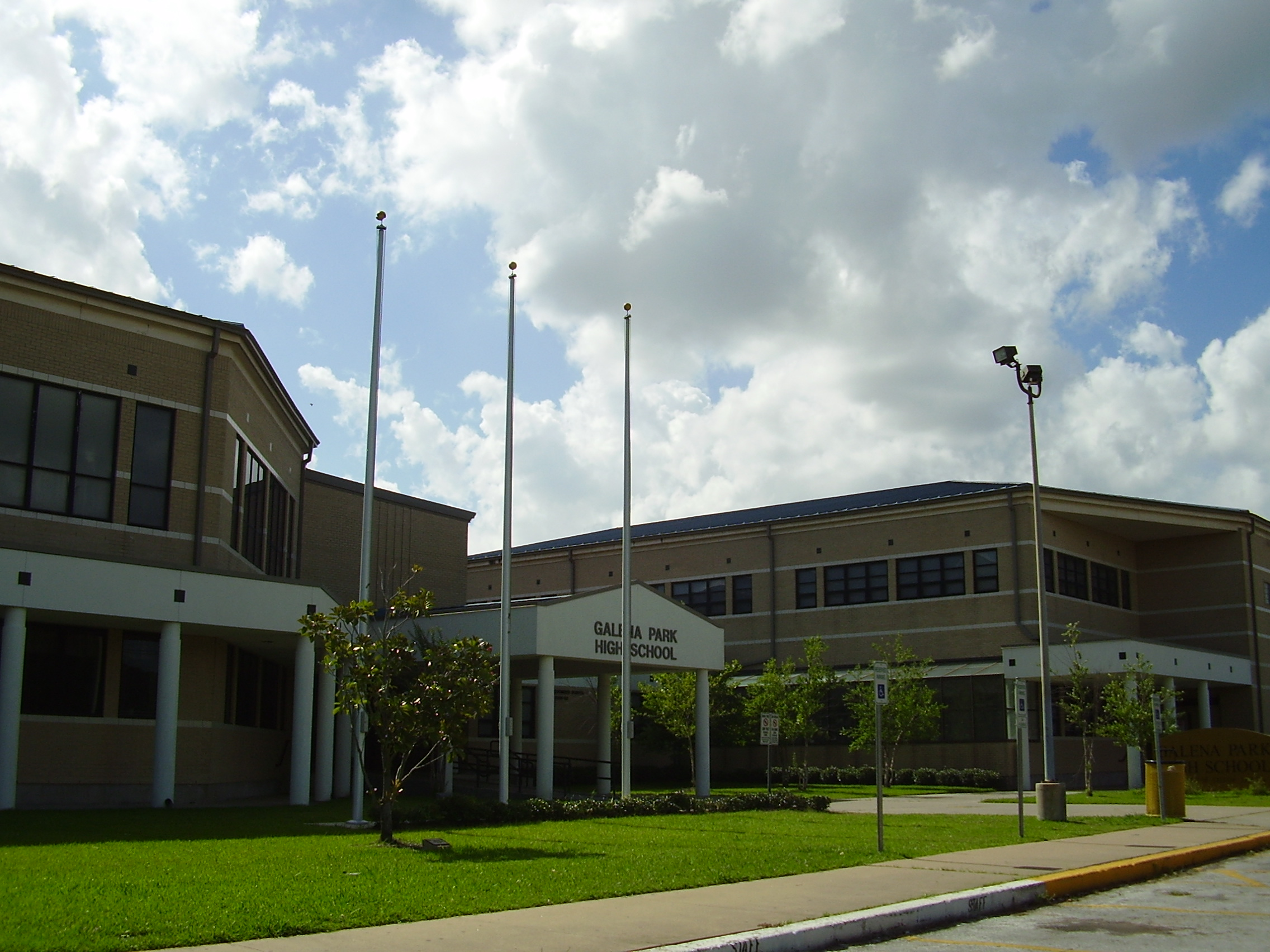
Galena Park High School

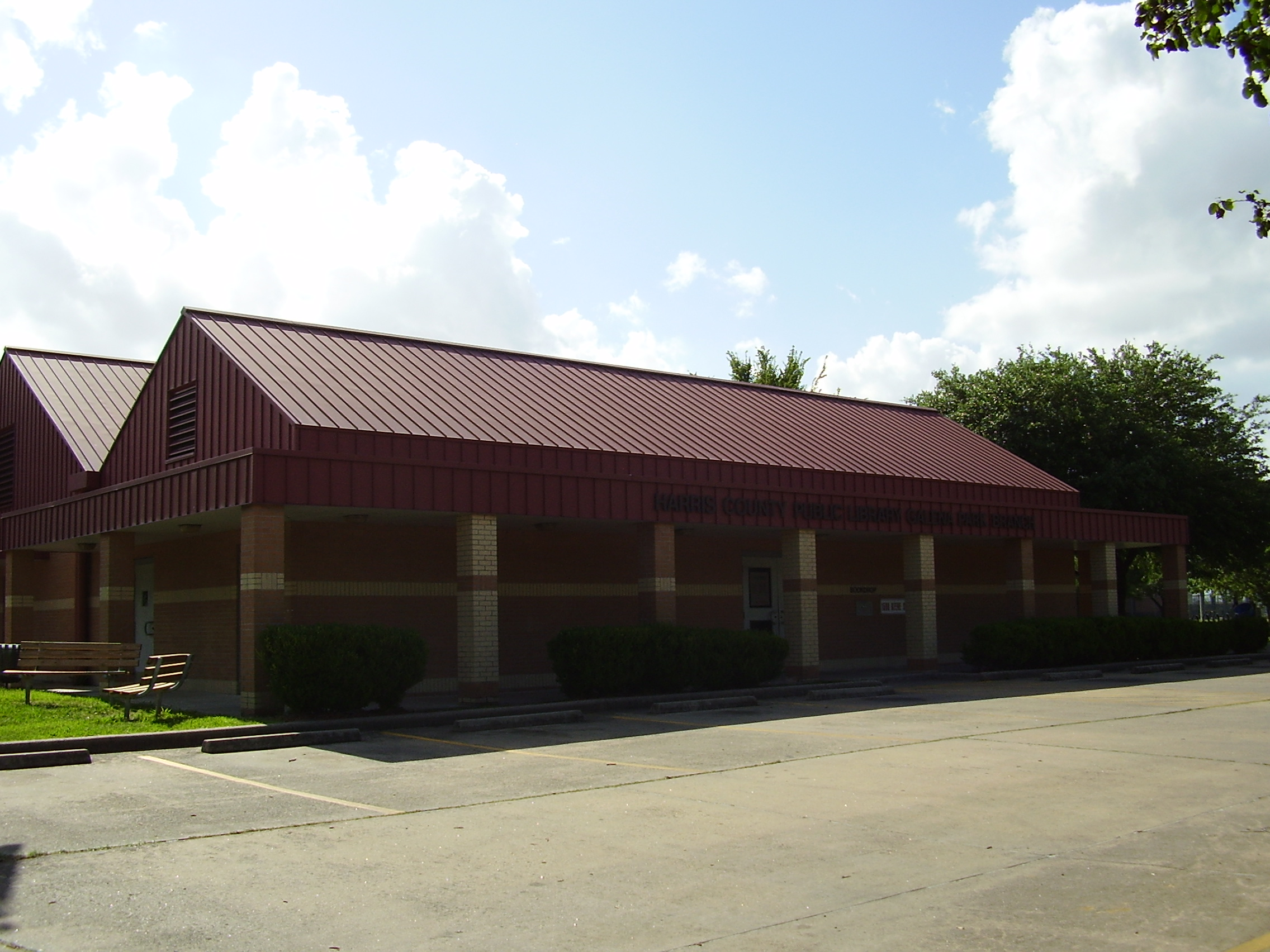
Galena Park Library

Students in Galena Park attend schools in Galena Park Independent School District.

Four separate elementary schools, Galena Park Elementary School in Galena Park, MacArthur Elementary School in Galena Park, Jacinto City Elementary School in Jacinto City, and Pyburn Elementary School in Houston, serve students from the city of Galena Park Almost all Galena Park students are zoned to Galena Park Middle School (6–8) in Galena Park. A few in northeast Galena Park are zoned to Woodland Acres Middle School in Houston. Galena Park residents are zoned to either Galena Park High School (9–12) in Galena Park or North Shore High School.

In addition, GPISD operates the William F. "Bill" Becker Early Childhood Development Center, a preschool program for low-income families, in Galena Park.

In the pre-1970 era of racial segregation in schools, the local high school for Black children was Fidelity Manor High School.

==== Private schools ====
Our Lady of Fatima School, a prekindergarten to grade 8 Roman Catholic school, is in Galena Park. The school is fully accredited by TEA and TCEA. It has served the community for over 60 years and is open in enrollment to all faiths and denominations.

=== Colleges and universities ===
The Galena Park ISD area (and therefore Galena Park) is zoned to the San Jacinto College system.

=== Public libraries ===
The Harris County Public Library (HCPL) system operates the Galena Park Branch at 1500 Keene Street in Galena Park. The 5,800-square-foot (540 m^{2}) branch, a partnership between HCPL and Galena Park, was built in March 1996, and opened in December of that year.

=== Gallery of schools ===
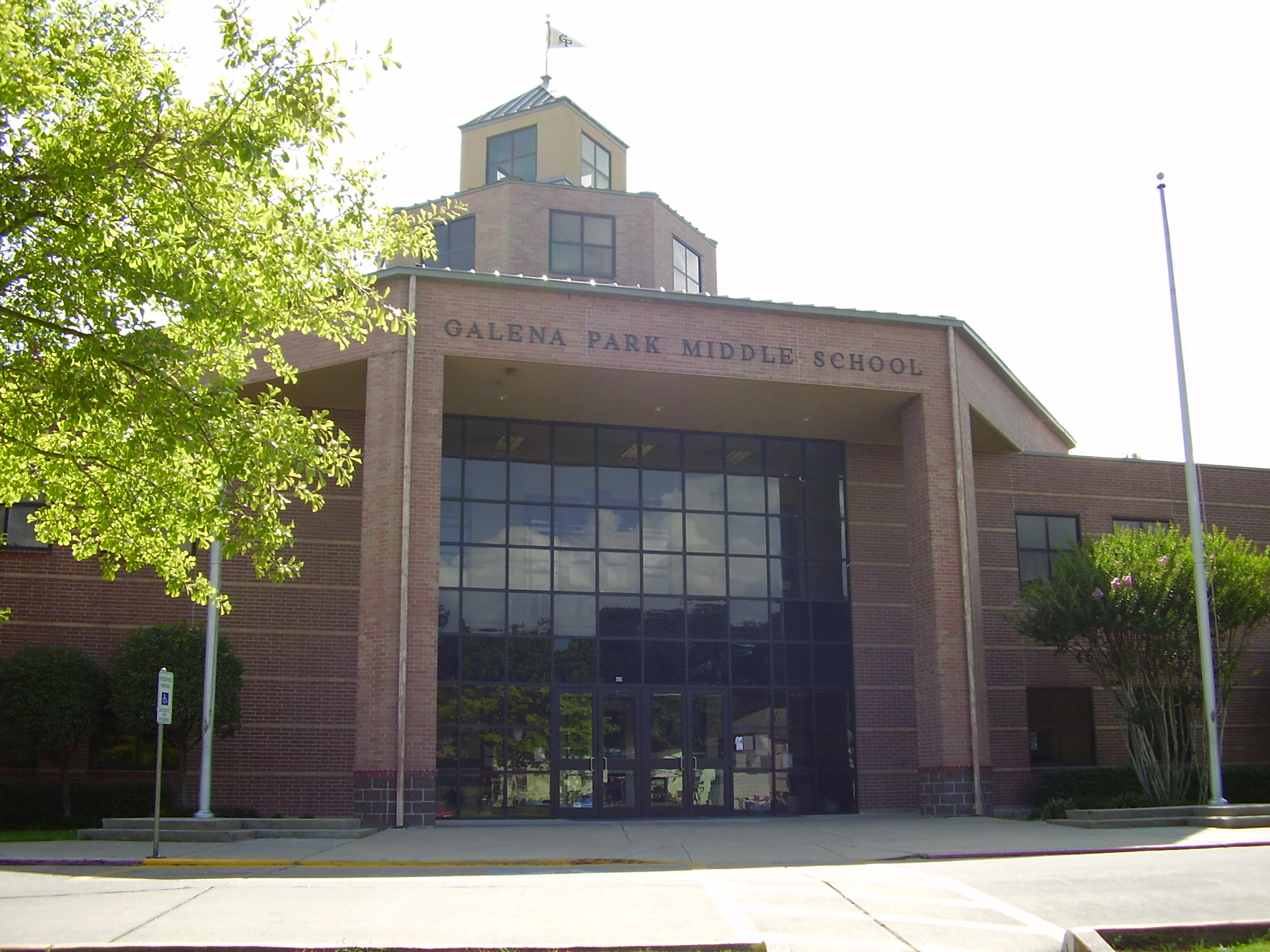
Galena Park Middle School

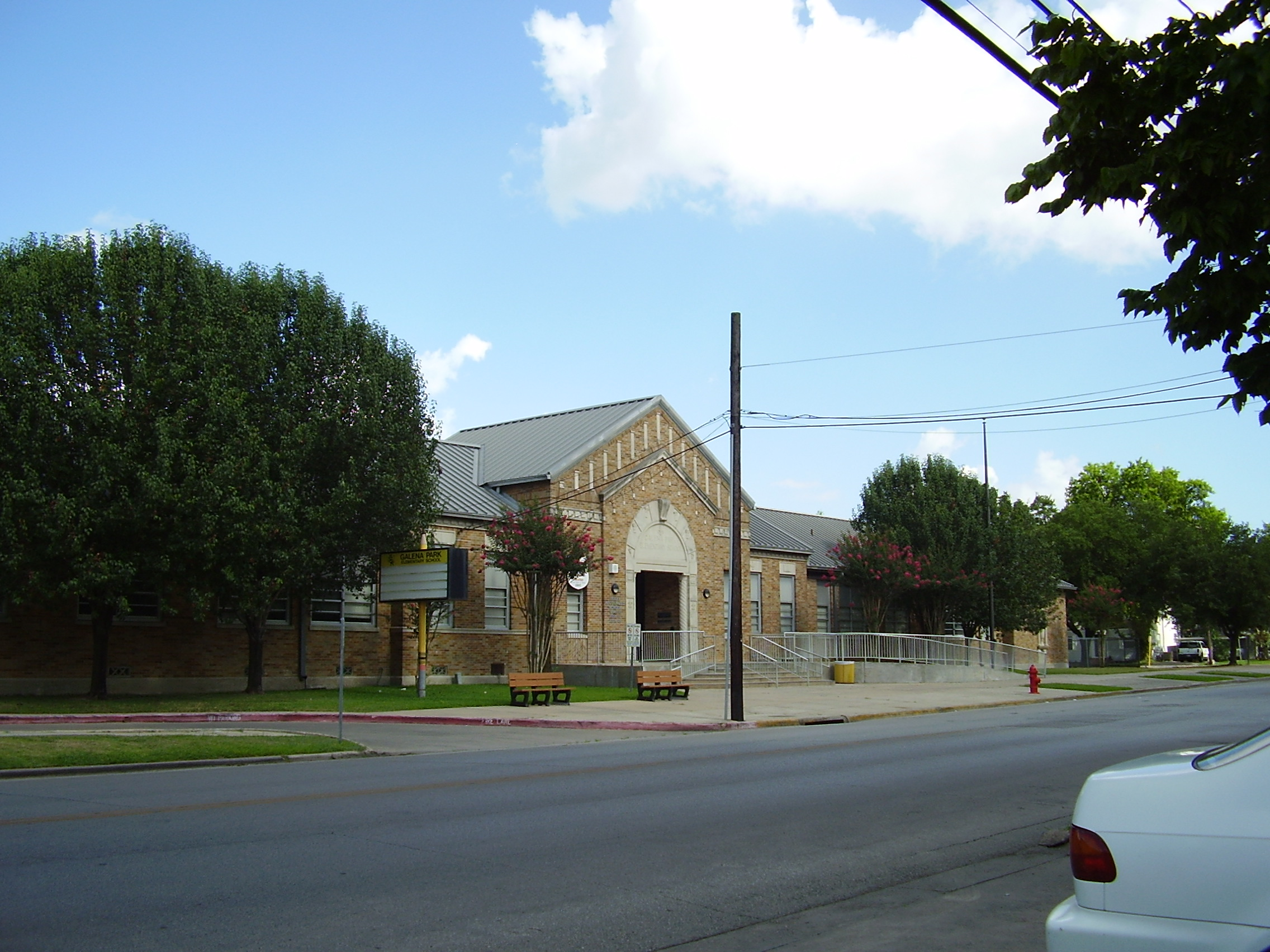
Galena Park Elementary School

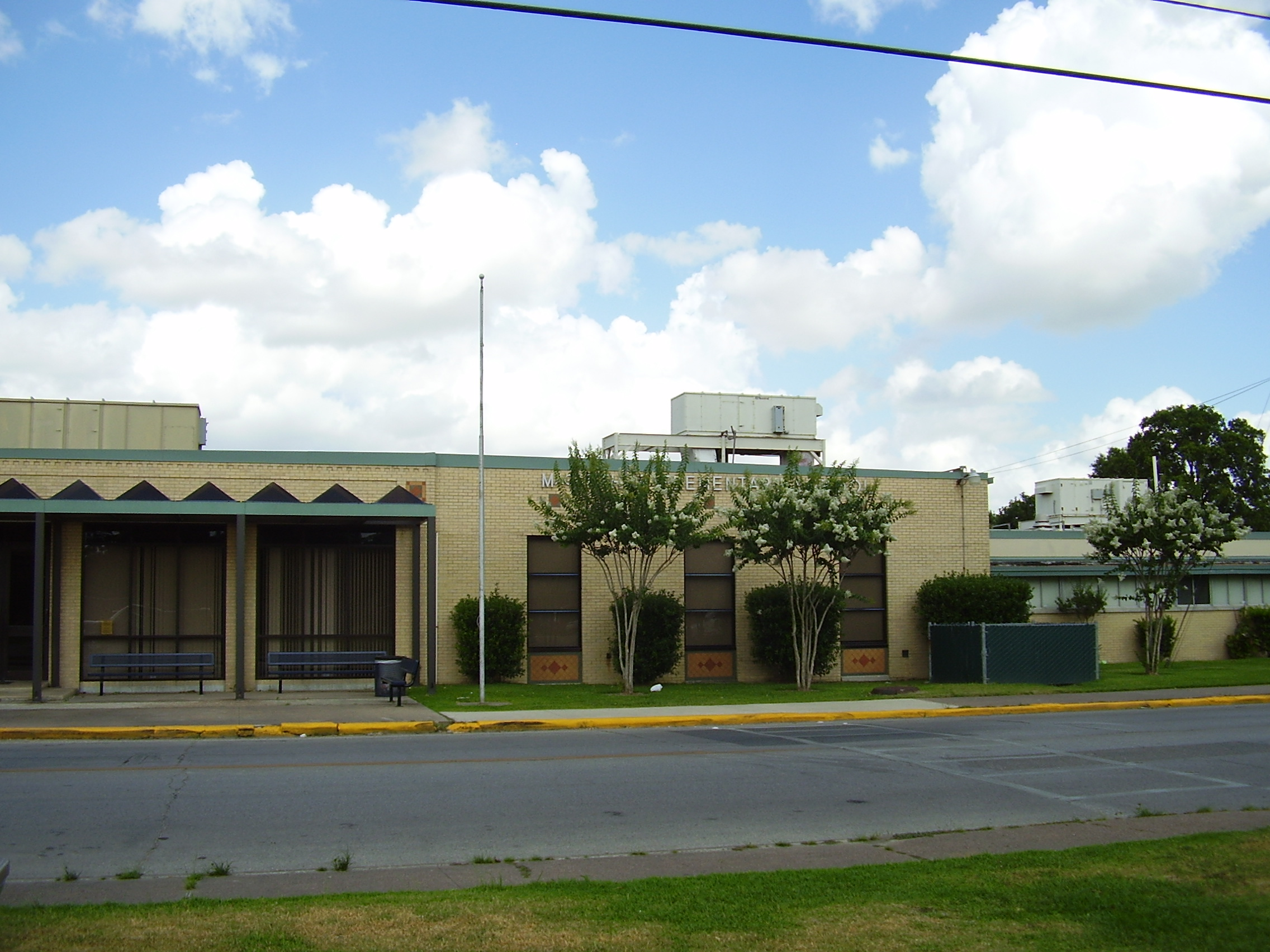
MacArthur Elementary School

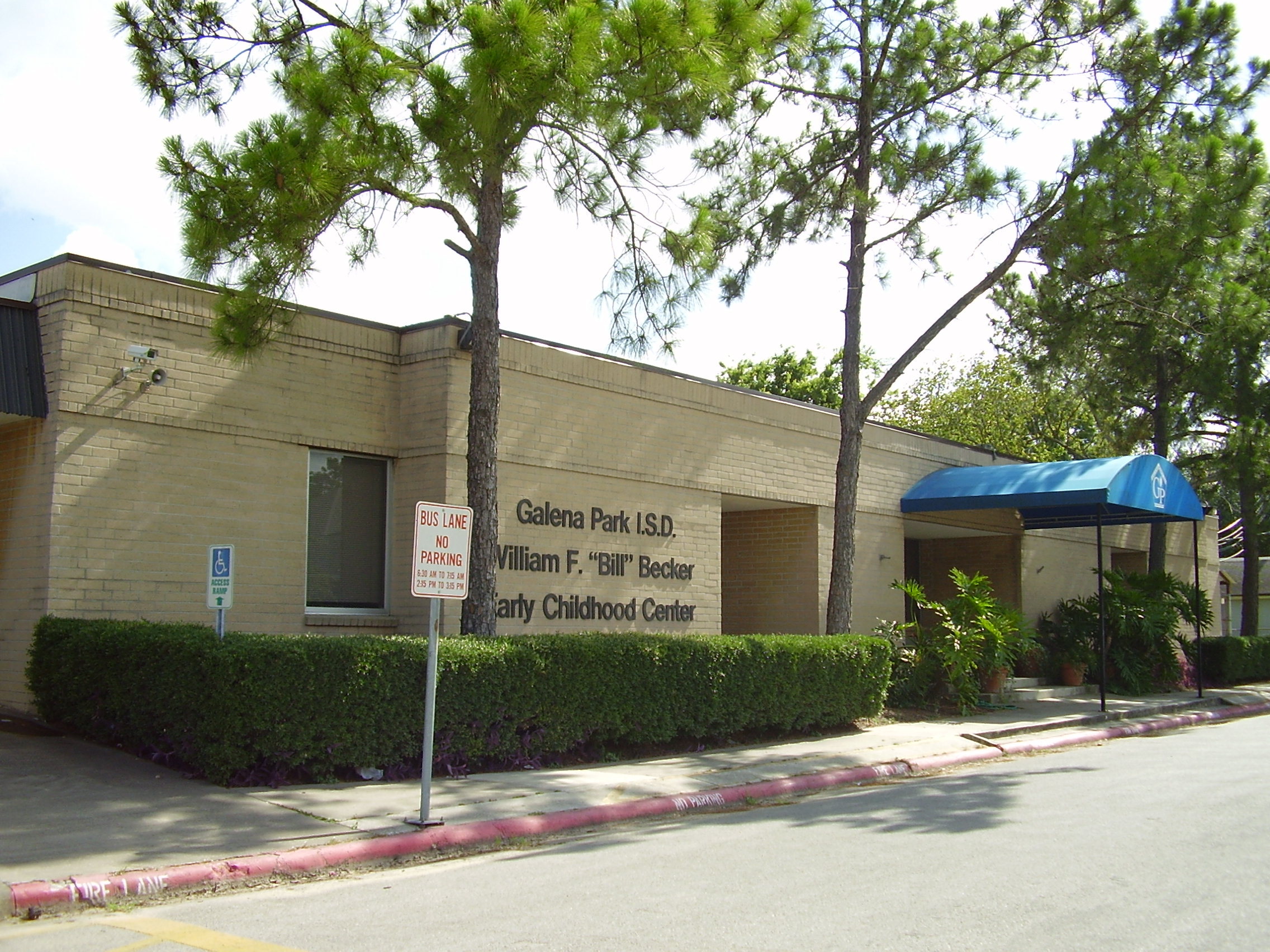
Becker Early Childhood Center

== Notable people ==
- Michael Glyn Brown, former hand surgeon
- Howard Twilley, professional football player

== Gallery ==
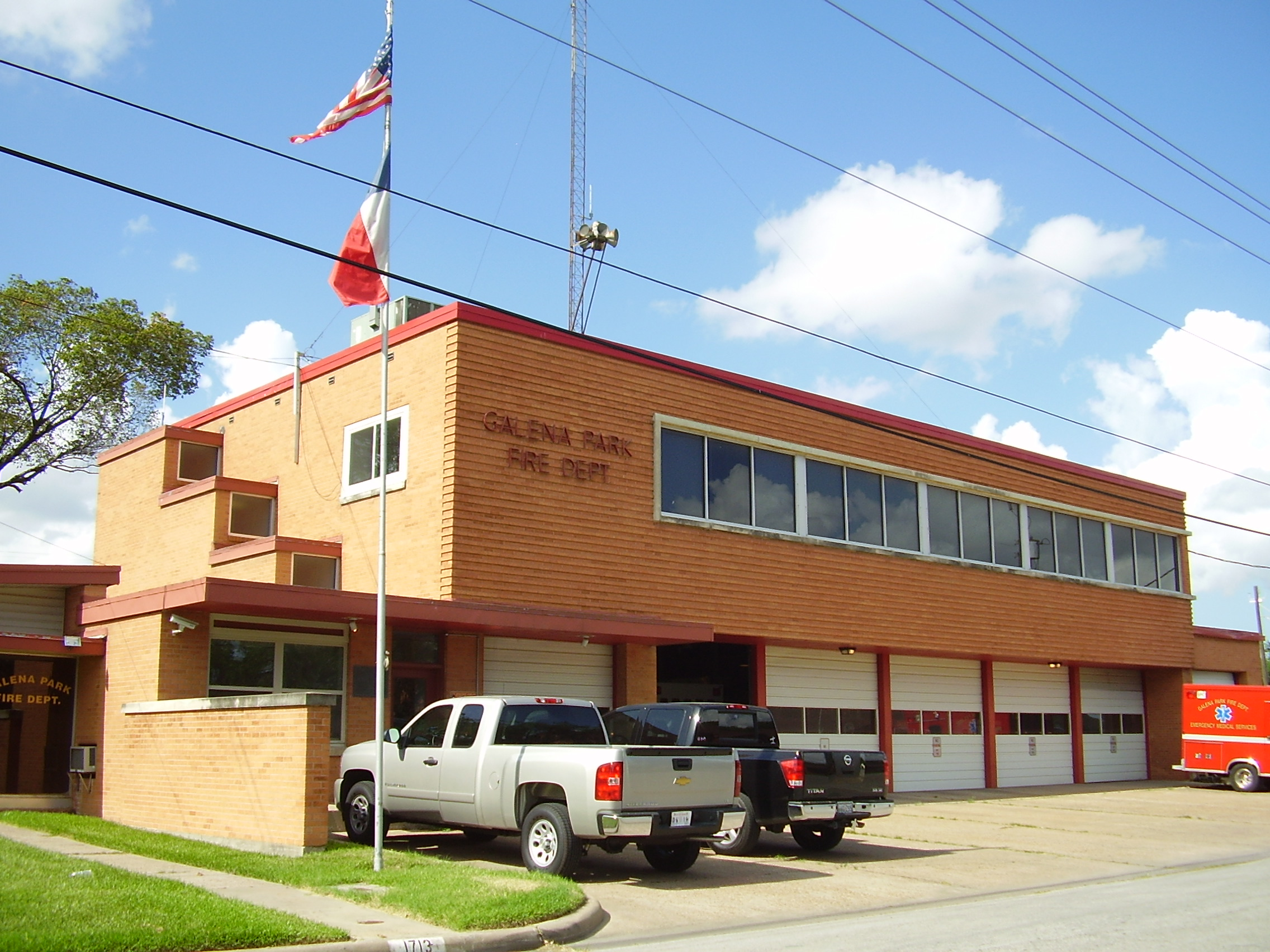
Galena Park Fire Station #1

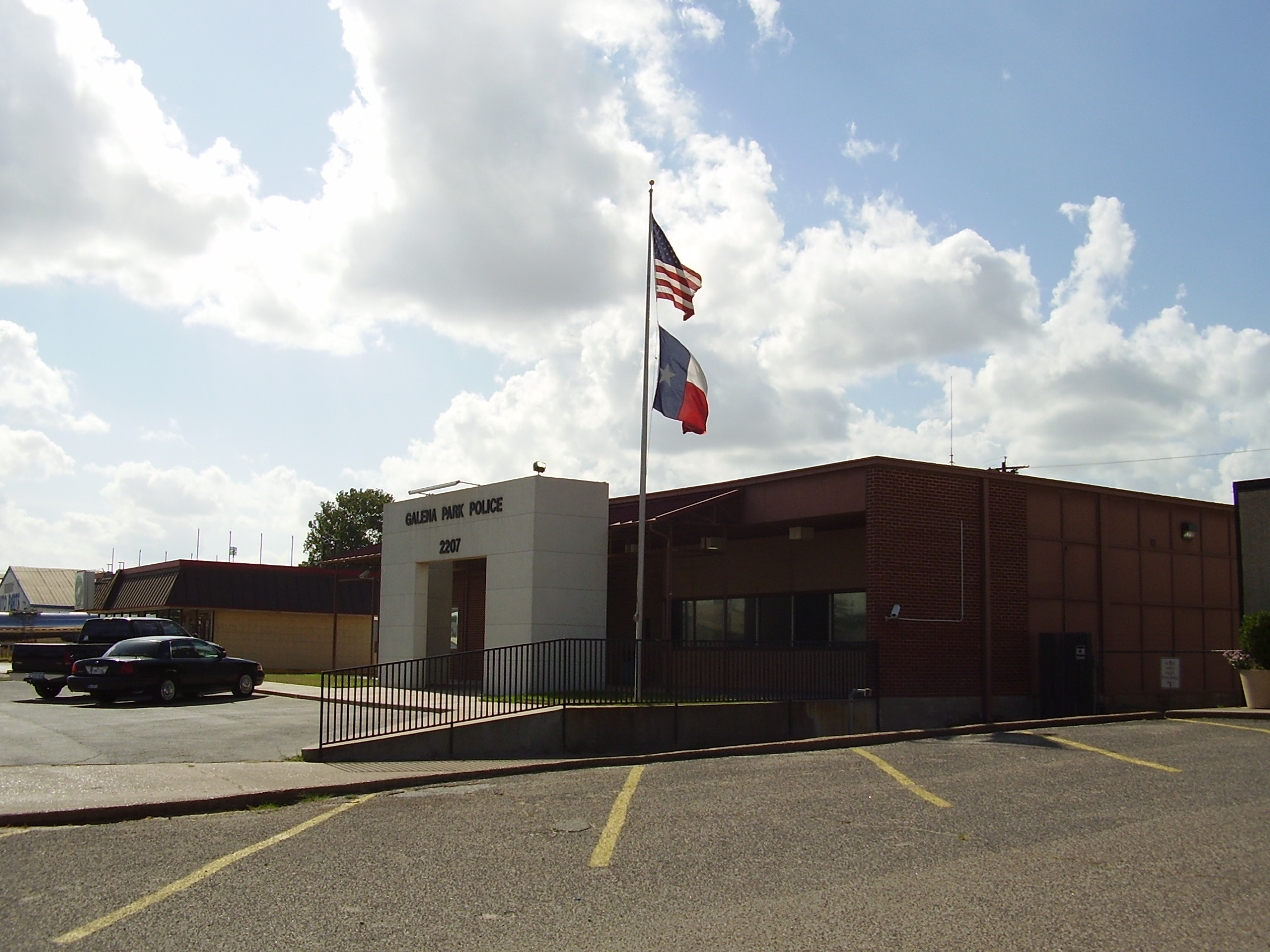
Galena Park Police Department
