= Frances Griscom Parsons =

American philanthropist

Frances "Fannie" Griscom Parsons (September 23, 1850 – 1925) was a philanthropist, reformer and educator. She founded and directed the first children's garden in DeWitt Clinton Park in New York City.

== Biography ==
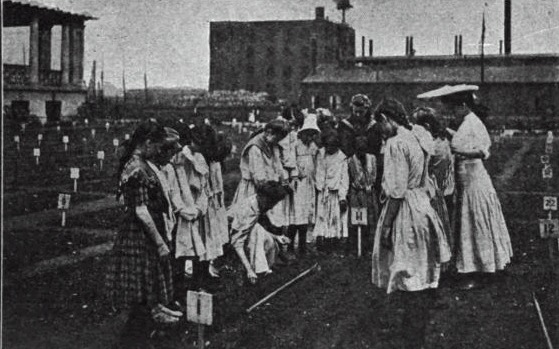
Looking north from the park toward the 59th Street Gasworks around 1910. The park's arbor (since torn down) is on the left

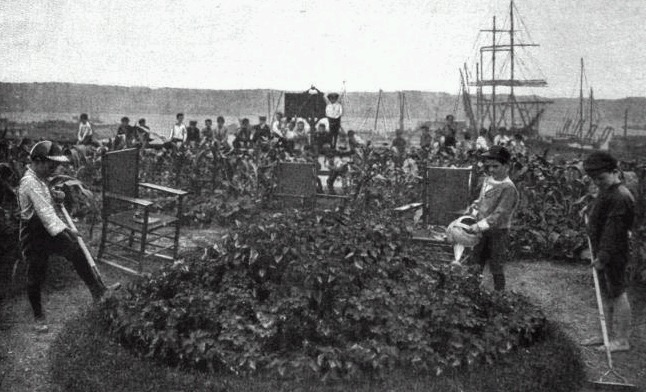
The garden area in 1906 with the unobstructed views of the Palisades

Born Frances Griscom on September 23, 1850 to Dr. John Hoskins Griscom (1809–1874), a founder and director of the New York City Board of Health, and Henrietta (née Peale) in New York City. Her paternal grandfather was Dr. John Griscom, and maternal grandfather was Rembrandt Peale. She married Henry Parsons (1835–1921) and had six children together, raising them in Brooklyn and then later Rye, New York.

In 1902 Parsons returned to New York City and became a member of the school board and was involved with the National Plant, Flower, and Fruit Guild, an organization that promoted children's nature study.

Parsons founded the “Children’s School Farm” in DeWitt Clinton Park on the West Side of Manhattan in the Hell's Kitchen neighborhood from a rubbish heap in 1902. The school farm contained 450 individual plots with a thousand children caring for them. Each child was responsible for a 4 foot by 8 foot plot containing corn, beets, carrots, peas, lettuce, radishes, and onions. The garden also had observational plots of grains, tomatoes, pumpkin, strawberries, and potatoes. Approximately 3,000 children participated in the farm during its first three years.

In creating the farm, Parsons hoped to create change by beautifying the neighborhood, reintroducing nature, and providing children healthy activities to support their development. Through gardening activities, Parsons encouraged immigrant children to gain civic virtues including cooperation, industriousness, and self-respect. The farm lasted until 1931 and launched the school gardening movement at the early turn of the century which incorporated elements of the Progressive Era including education, transforming the urban environment, the small parks movement, and the City Beautiful movement. By 1906, over 7,500 school farms had been created throughout the United States based on Parsons' model.

In 1910, Parsons created the International School Farm League (ISFL) and similar farms throughout New York City. As president of the ISFL, in 1908 she created a six-week course to train teachers in how to create and maintain school farms.
