= Mount Sinai Medical Center (Miami) =

Hospital in Miami Beach, Florida, US

Coordinates: 25°48′47″N 80°8′27″W

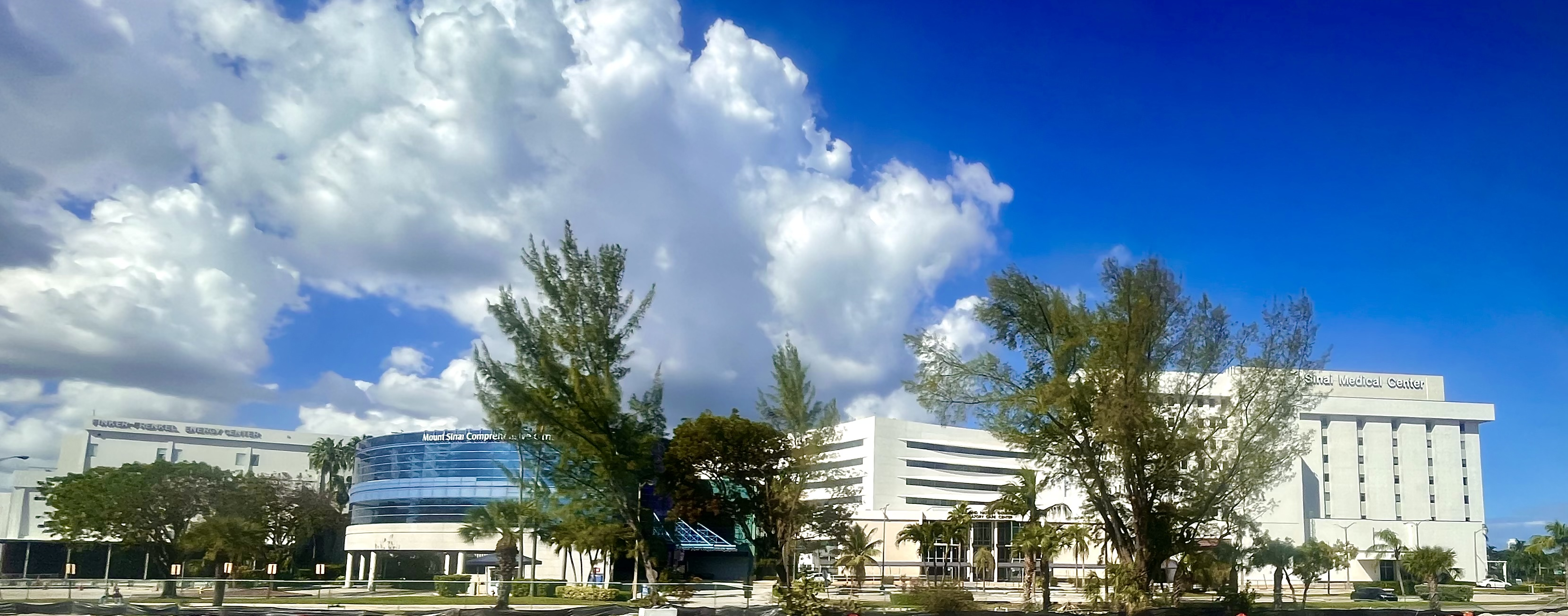

Geography
- Location: 4300 Alton Rd, Miami Beach, FL

Services
- Emergency department: Yes
- Beds: 589

Helipads
- Helipad: FAA LID: FL93

Links
- Website: https://www.msmc.com/

Mount Sinai Medical Center is a hospital located at 4300 Alton Road in Miami Beach, Florida. It is the largest private, independent not-for-profit teaching hospital in Florida. The institution was incorporated on March 11, 1946, and opened its current location on December 4, 1949.

== Locations and affiliations ==
Mount Sinai Medical Center includes six locations throughout Miami-Dade County. In 2009, Mount Sinai Medical Center began an affiliation with Columbia University, allowing for students and patients to treat, research, and study between Miami and New York City. As part of the affiliation, the Mount Sinai Heart Institute and the Columbia University Divisions of Cardiology and Urology at Mount Sinai were created. This institution is not affiliated with the Mount Sinai School of Medicine or Mount Sinai Hospital, established in 1852 in New York.

The center's five satellite locations include a freestanding emergency department, physician offices, diagnostic center and cancer center in Aventura, physician offices in Coral Gables, Hialeah and Key Biscayne and a diagnostic catheterization and sleep lab in Coral Gables. Mount Sinai includes more than 700 physicians, 4,500 employees and 500 volunteers.

== Facilities ==
As of 2020, the medical center has nearly 600 staffed beds.

=== Miami Heart Institute ===
Mount Sinai purchased Miami Heart Institute in 2000 for $75 million on the theory that consolidating the two hospitals would slowly ease the competition of the two nearby facilities and improve their image. Many of Miami Heart Institute's Doctors, nurses and skilled technical staff were transferred over to Mount Sinai as part of the acquisition. In February 2012, Mount Sinai Medical Center sold the Miami Heart Institute building, which was redeveloped into a luxury condo under the Ritz-Carlton brand. As of 2020, Mount Sinai Medical Center is the only hospital and largest employer on Miami Beach.

=== Mount Sinai Medical Center ===
Mount Sinai Medical Center provides following clinical services:

- Allergy / Immunology
- Arthritis & Rheumatology
- Alzheimer's disease
- Cardiology
- Cardiac Surgery
- Colorectal Surgery
- Critical Care
- Dental Care & Oral Surgery
- Dermatology
- Diagnostic Services
- Dialysis
- Ear, Nose & Throat
- Electrophysiology
- Emergency Medicine
- Endocrinology
- Family Medicine
- Gastroenterology
- General Surgery
- Gynecology
- Hospice Care
- Infectious Disease
- Internal & Geriatric Medicine
- Interventional Cardiology
- Interventional Radiology
- Laboratory & Pathology
- Long Term Ventilator Care
- Memory Disorders
- Neonatology
- Neurology & Neurosurgery
- Obstetrics
- Occupational Health
- Oncology
- Ophthalmology
- Orthodontics
- Orthopaedics
- Outpatient Surgery
- Pain Management
- Pediatric Emergency Care
- Plastic & Reconstructive
- Radiology
- Surgery
- Podiatry
- Pulmonary
- Psychiatry
- Radiation Oncology
- Rehabilitation
- Sleep Disorders
- Thoracic & Cardiovascular
- Surgery
- Urology
- Vascular Medicine & Vascular Surgery
- Wound Healing

Mount Sinai currently has 15 different buildings, as follows:

- Ascher Building
- Blum Pavilion
- Comprehensive Cancer Center
- De Hirsch Meyer Tower (Main Building)
- Energy Building
- Golden Medical Office Building
- Greene Pavilion
- Greenspan Pavilion
- Gumenick Ambulatory Surgical Center
- Knight MRI Center
- Lowenstein Building
- Simon Medical Office Building
- Orovitz Emergency Building
- Pearlman Research Facility
- Warner Pavilion

== Notable births ==
- Laila Ali, a former professional boxer and daughter of world famous boxer Muhammad Ali, was born in Miami Heart Institute on December 30, 1977
- Princess Eugénie of Bourbon, a relative of the Spanish royal family, was born at Mount Sinai on March 5, 2007

== Notable deaths ==
- Margaret Hayes, a film, stage, and television actress from Baltimore, died in the hospital
- Maurice Gibb, a musician, singer and songwriter from Douglas, Isle of Man who was a member of the popular music group The Bee Gees, died at the hospital
- Michael Glyn Brown, a former hand surgeon from Houston involved in legal disputes, died at the hospital.
- Vic Damone, a singer and actor from New York City died at the hospital
- Zaha Hadid, an architect from Iraq, died at the hospital
- Rafael Consuegra, Cuban-born American sculptor, died at the hospital on September 17, 2021, at 80 years of age from a heart attack
- Nelson Eddy, an actor and baritone singer, died at the hospital in the early morning hours of March 6, 1967 after being stricken on stage with a cerebral hemorrhage while performing at the Sans Souci Hotel
