= Clinton Park, Houston =

Neighborhood in Houston, Texas, U.S.

Coordinates: 29.740°N 95.258°W

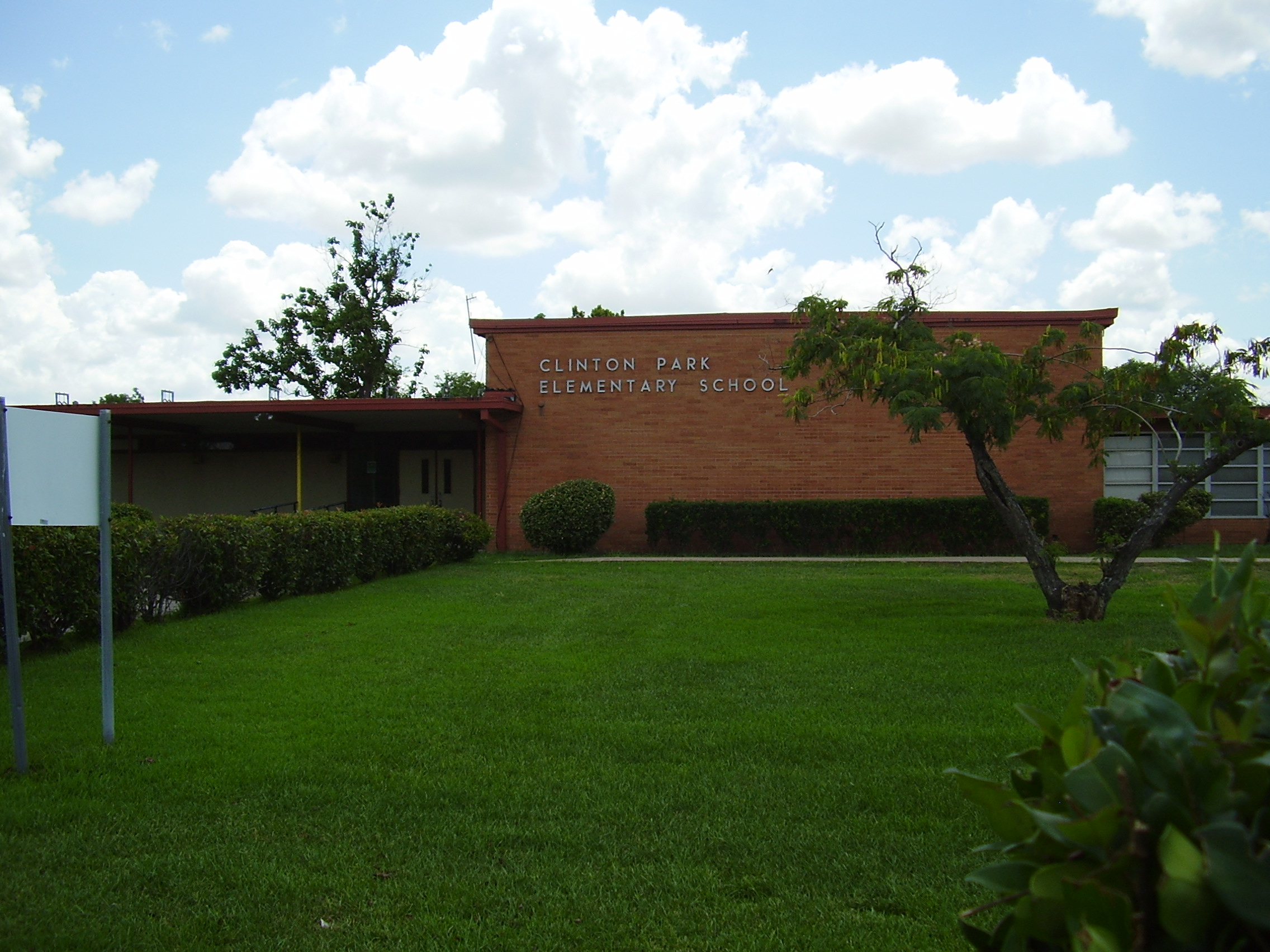
Clinton Park Elementary School closed in 2005

Clinton Park is a neighborhood located in Houston, Texas. Clinton Park is located outside the 610 Loop in eastern Houston. Clinton Park is predominantly African-American. Carolyn Campbell of KHOU-TV described Clinton Park, close to the Port of Houston, as "small" and "isolated."

== History ==
After World War II development in the area began due to the area's close proximity to the Port of Houston. Clinton Park was one of the first communities developed for African-Americans in Texas. When Clinton Park was originally developed, it was marketed to middle class black families. When Clinton Park was first developed, laws required segregation between White people and Black people; Blacks could not live in White neighborhoods. Clinton Park had many businesses. When racial integration occurred, Blacks no longer patronized Clinton Park and the community declined.

In the 2000s Mayor of Houston Bill White started the Houston HOPE program to make some low income neighborhoods attractive to families with children; Clinton Park is one of the neighborhoods in Houston HOPE. A nonprofit job training program in the Clinton Park area closed several years before 2006.

== Cityscape ==
Rafael Longoria and Susan Rogers of the Rice Design Alliance said that the layout of Clinton Park could be described as "rurban," a word coined in 1918 which describes an area with a mix of urban and rural characteristics. Longoria and Rogers said in 2008 that Clinton Park, sparsely populated, "is isolated both geographically and socially from the rest of Houston." The border between Clinton Park and Galena Park, once a predominantly white city, is still barricaded. Longoria and Rogers said that the barricade "provides a stark example of how the prevailing segregationist sentiments of the era is still in evidence." During the same year Longoria and Rogers said that if Clinton Park's trend of population loss continued, Clinton Park would be vacant in under 25 years. In an editorial piece in the Houston Chronicle, Carol Alvarado, a member of the Houston City Council, said that Clinton Park was among the neighborhoods that were the most exposed to air pollutants in the City of Houston.

== Education ==
Clinton Park is served by the Houston Independent School District. Clinton Park is in Trustee District VIII, represented by Diana Dávila as of 2009.

Schools include Pleasantville Elementary School, Holland Middle School, and Furr High School.

Prior to spring 2005, Clinton Park was served by Clinton Park Elementary School at 158 Mississippi St.. After spring 2005, Clinton Park Elementary School closed because it had a too small enrollment; its final enrollment was 148 students. The students were moved to Pleasantville Elementary School. Josephine Espree, a teacher at Clinton Park, said that the school closing was like a "death in the family" for the community. Edwin Davis, president of the Clinton Park Civic Club, criticized the closing of the school.

Residents are within the Houston Community College System boundaries.

== Government and infrastructure ==
Clinton Park is in Houston City Council District I.

The Houston Fire Department Fire Station 42 Ship Channel, a part of Fire District 20, serves Clinton Park. The station, originally a city hall/volunteer fire station located in Clinton Park, was annexed by the City of Houston in 1955. The city moved the station to its current location in 1980.

The Houston Police Department Northeast Patrol Division serves the neighborhood with its headquarters at 8301 Ley Road.

The City of Houston closed a clinic in Clinton Park in the 1970s.

Harris Health System (formerly Harris County Hospital District) designated Ripley Health Center in the East End for ZIP code 77029. In 2000 Ripley was replaced by the Gulfgate Health Center. The designated public hospital is Ben Taub General Hospital in the Texas Medical Center.

== Parks ==
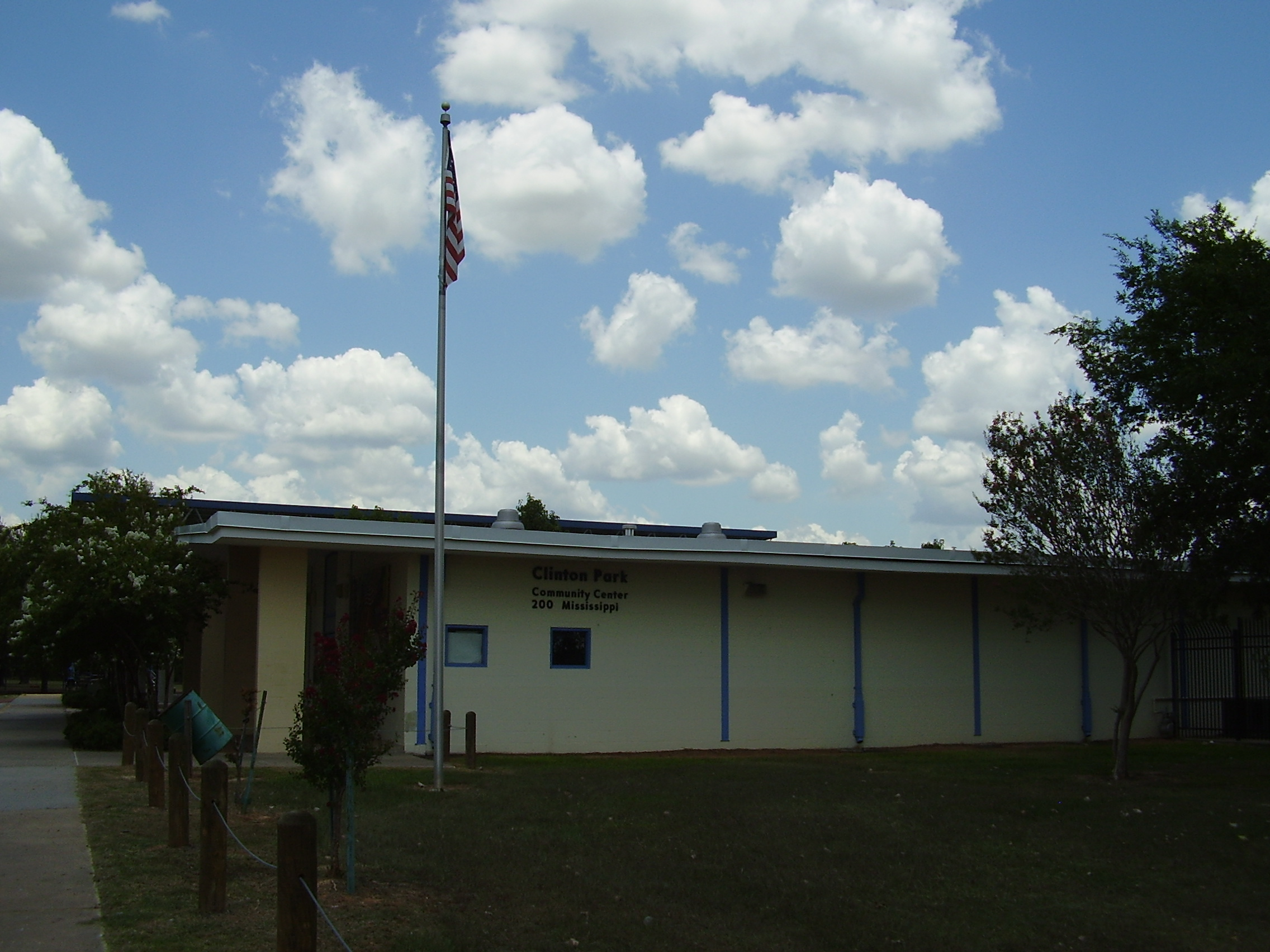
Clinton Park

Clinton Park and Clinton Community Center are located at 200 Mississippi Drive. The community center has a swimming pool, lighted tennis courts, a lighted sports field, a playground, an outdoor basketball pavilion, a 0.42 mile hike and bicycle trail, and a nine-hole disc golf course.

== See also ==
- DeWitt Clinton Park
