= DeWitt Clinton Park =

Public park in Manhattan, New York

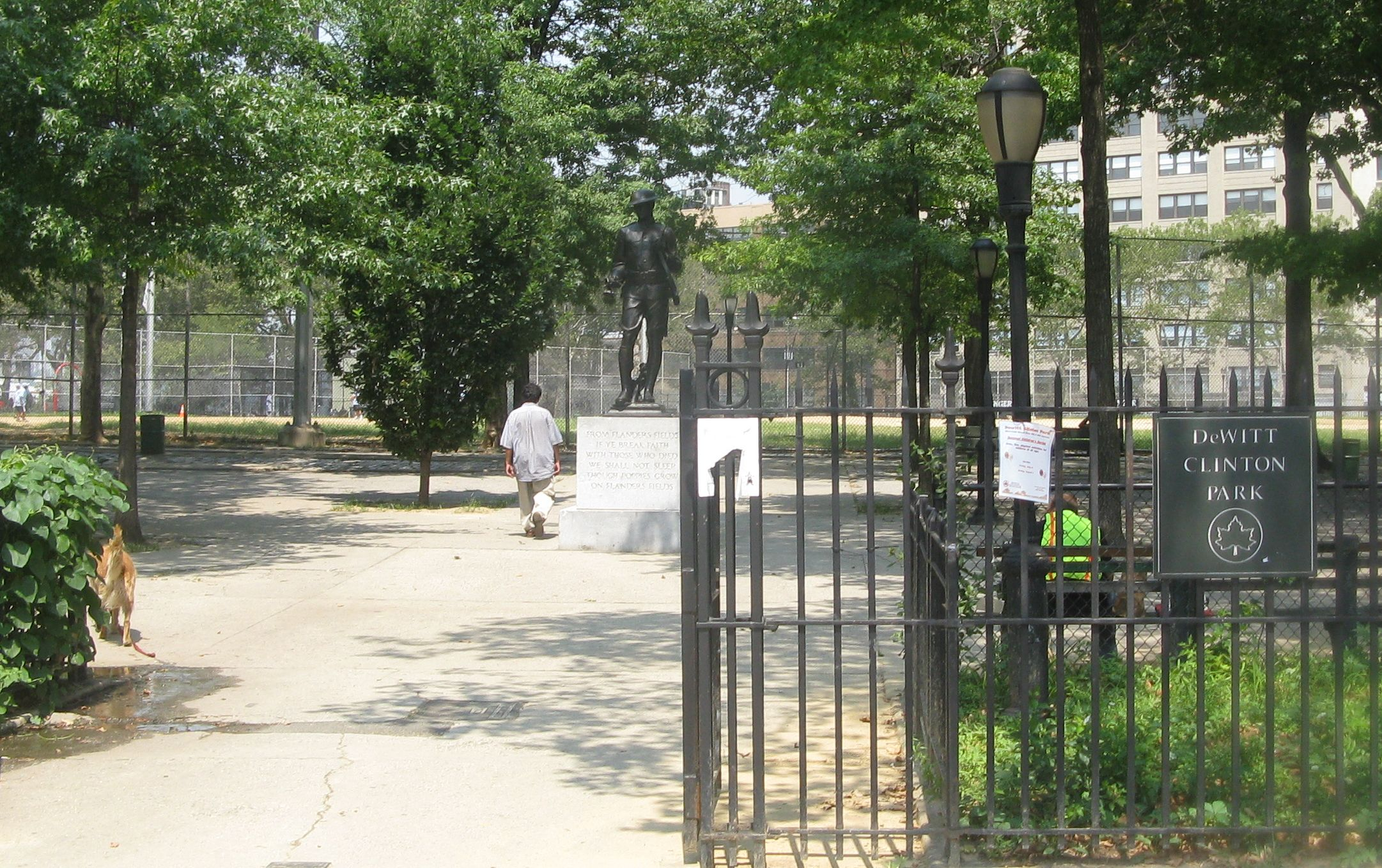
- Southeast entrance to park, with doughboy
- Interactive map of DeWitt Clinton Park
- Type: Urban park
- Location: Manhattan, New York City
- Coordinates: 40°46′5.56″N 73°59′39.49″W
- Area: 5.8 acres (2.3 ha)
- Created: 1906
- Operator: New York City Department of Parks and Recreation
- Open: 6 a.m. to 1 a.m.
- Status: Open all year

DeWitt Clinton Park is a 5.8-acre (23,000 m^{2}) New York City public park in the Hell's Kitchen neighborhood of Manhattan, New York City, between West 52nd and 54th Streets, and Eleventh and Twelfth Avenues.

The park, which was one of the first New York City parks in Manhattan on the working waterfront of the Hudson River, is named for DeWitt Clinton, who had created a business boom of Hudson commerce when he opened the Erie Canal. It is the biggest city park in the neighborhood, and since 1959, the neighborhood has frequently been referred to as "Clinton". It is the only park on the west side of Manhattan to have lighted ball fields.

The park was the first community garden in New York City.

== History ==
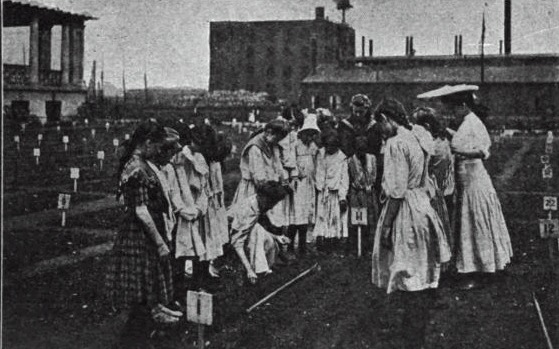
Looking north from the park toward the 59th Street Gasworks around 1910. The park's arbor (since torn down) is on the left

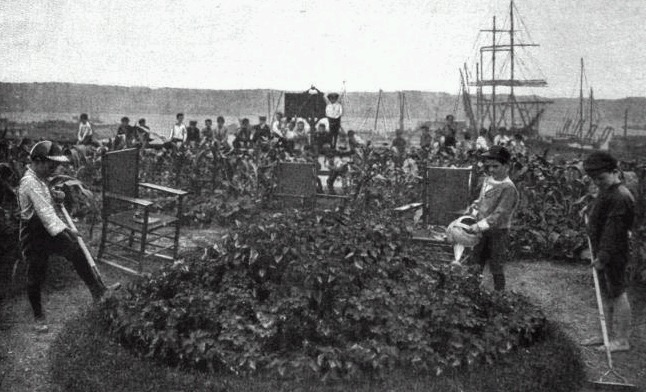
The garden area in 1906 with the unobstructed views of the Palisades

=== Site ===
The land for the park was part of the Striker and Hopper homestead farms which had been in those families for more than 200 years. The home of General Garrit Hopper Striker built in 1752 had been torn down in 1895. Another farmhouse called the Mott farmhouse built in 1796 on 54th Street was torn down in 1896. The city announced plans to purchase the land (called "Sriker's Lane") in 1896. Other buildings on the site were torn down in 1902 and a tent was placed on the site in 1903. In 1906 the hilly terrain was graded at a cost of $200,000. At the same time, the De Witt Clinton High School opened nearby on Tenth Avenue.

The park's original 1901 design by Samuel Parsons Jr. encompassed a bigger park that was much less developed than the current park. Since Navy requirements set length limits on piers, the city was able to lengthen the piers by removing land from Manhattan so that longer piers could be built that would not extend beyond the Navy limits. The park was originally 7.4 acres (30,000 m^{2}) and stretched nearly to the Hudson River, and it featured a recreation/bathing pavilion, gymnasium, running track, playgrounds, and a series of curving paths with viewing desks of the Hudson River and the Palisades. The park's centerpiece was a children's farm garden, which operated from 1902 to 1932. The farm, which was the first of its kind in New York City, was championed by Frances Griscom Parsons (no relation to the landscaper Samuel Parsons). It featured flower beds, observation plots, a pergola, and 356 4' × 8' vegetable gardens each assigned to a "little farmer".

The most vivid imagination could not have conceived a more desolate spot than this was in the summer of 1902. Approached from the east, through filthy streets crowded with noisy, dirty urchins, it loomed up a dark blot upon the beautiful background of cool river, green hills, and blue sky. Rows of tumble-down houses, disused carts, piles of rubbish, stones, rags, and litter, among which the children played, made even the streets seem neat and orderly by comparison.

— The Atlantic Monthly, as it was about to be rehabilitated,

Parsons himself also described the park:

DeWitt Clinton Park is a children's play-ground situated on the banks of the Hudson River, bounded on the west by Twelfth Ave., on the south by 52nd Street, on the east by Eleventh Ave., and on the north by 54th Street, between nine and 10 acres (40,000 m^{2}) in extent. This park is specially well arranged for the introduction of play-grounds. The borders on three sides are more or less steep and through the center extends a level plateau which has been made more level by grading. Walks wind up from all the four corners and at two intermediate points on one side and one on the other. The steepness of the ground makes it possible to produce a picturesque, park-like effect of trees and shrubs over a large extent of the territory. Natural rocks appear in several places throughout its surface. A broad path leads from the center of the park on Eleventh Ave. to a gymnasium ground surrounded by trees; and in front of this, on an undulating lawn of its own, is a fine music stand. Beyond this a farm garden for children has been established and five hundred or more little ones from this neighborhood farm their little plots throughout the season. Beyond this, in turn, on a high, steep bank overlooking the Hudson, extends a long pergola or arbor beneath which are rooms used as night schools by the farm children, where they are taught domestic economy.

— Samuel Parsons

=== Development and decline ===
In 1930 a sculpture Flanders Field Memorial featuring a doughboy by Burt Johnson, a brother-in-law of Augustus Saint-Gaudens, was dedicated in the park. Johnson also designed a similar statue in Doughboy Park in Woodside, Queens. The gardens were discontinued in 1932 when 250-foot (76 m) wide swath on the west side of the park was removed to be used as part of the West Side Elevated Highway. The removed earth was transported to Central Park where it was used to fill in the Lower Reservoir for what would become the park's Great Lawn. The park's unobstructed views of the Hudson were further diminished with the construction in 1935 of the New York Passenger Ship Terminal. In the shrinking of land, a 250-foot (76 m) wide swath on the west of the park was removed in the 1930s for the Terminal and West Side Elevated Highway. The park's unobstructed views of the Hudson River and New Jersey Palisades have been affected by the construction of the New York Passenger Terminal (although a sidewalk along a sycamore lined curved path on the west side is a popular vantage point for viewing cruise ships at the terminal). The children's garden was removed in 1932. The undulating lawn, music stands, and lengthy arbor have been removed. In their place is a fenced-in lighted area for three baseball fields, an asphalt basketball and handball courts and a children's playground as well as a dog park.

In 1959, residents sought to soften Hell's Kitchen and decided to rename the neighborhood Clinton, after the park. By the 1980s and 1990s, the area around the park had little residential population and it developed a reputation as an outpost for illegal drug use and homeless encampments. In October 1986 three teenagers murdered a homeless man in the park with a kitchen knife.

Various attempts to clean the park included an instance in 1995, when a German company set up a tent for seven months on the lawn for a dinner show production of Pomp Duck and Circumstance. The company promised to pay $100,000 for improvements to the park. The dinner show was opposed by residents who objected to commercialization of the neighborhood's lone major park (Hell's Kitchen is the jurisdiction of Manhattan Community Board 4 which ranked 57th out of 59 Community Boards for open space in New York City). Following the dinner show, the park was extensively renovated with a new Erie Canal Playground designed around a granite outcropping. Other changes included new fencing and gates so that the park could be locked at night. A dog park was added to a converted Bocce court.

=== Today ===
In 1998, legislation passed creating the 550-acre (2.2 km^{2}) Hudson River Park across Twelfth Avenue from the park along the Hudson River between 59th Street and Battery Park. The new park is a joint New York City and New York State park whereas the DeWitt Clinton Park is a city park. Currently, there is no direct connection between the two parks, as the New York Passenger Ship Terminal is built along the entire west side. However, the New York City Economic Development Corporation announced plans in 2025 to upgrade the ship terminal, which would include a new pedestrian bridge across the West Side Highway between the terminal and the park.

In 2005, ENK International Trade Events applied to erect a tent for two weeks in September over the handball and basketball courts in exchange for some minor repairs to the park facilities for a Fashion week event. After a subcommittee approved it, a storm of protest prompted the Community Board to veto it.

In addition to the historic garden, the park features a children's playground, dog park, and areas for basketball, baseball, soccer, and handball. The park hosts sporting events such as the International Quidditch Association's fourth World Cup, which was held in the park on November 13–14, 2010.

== Poems ==
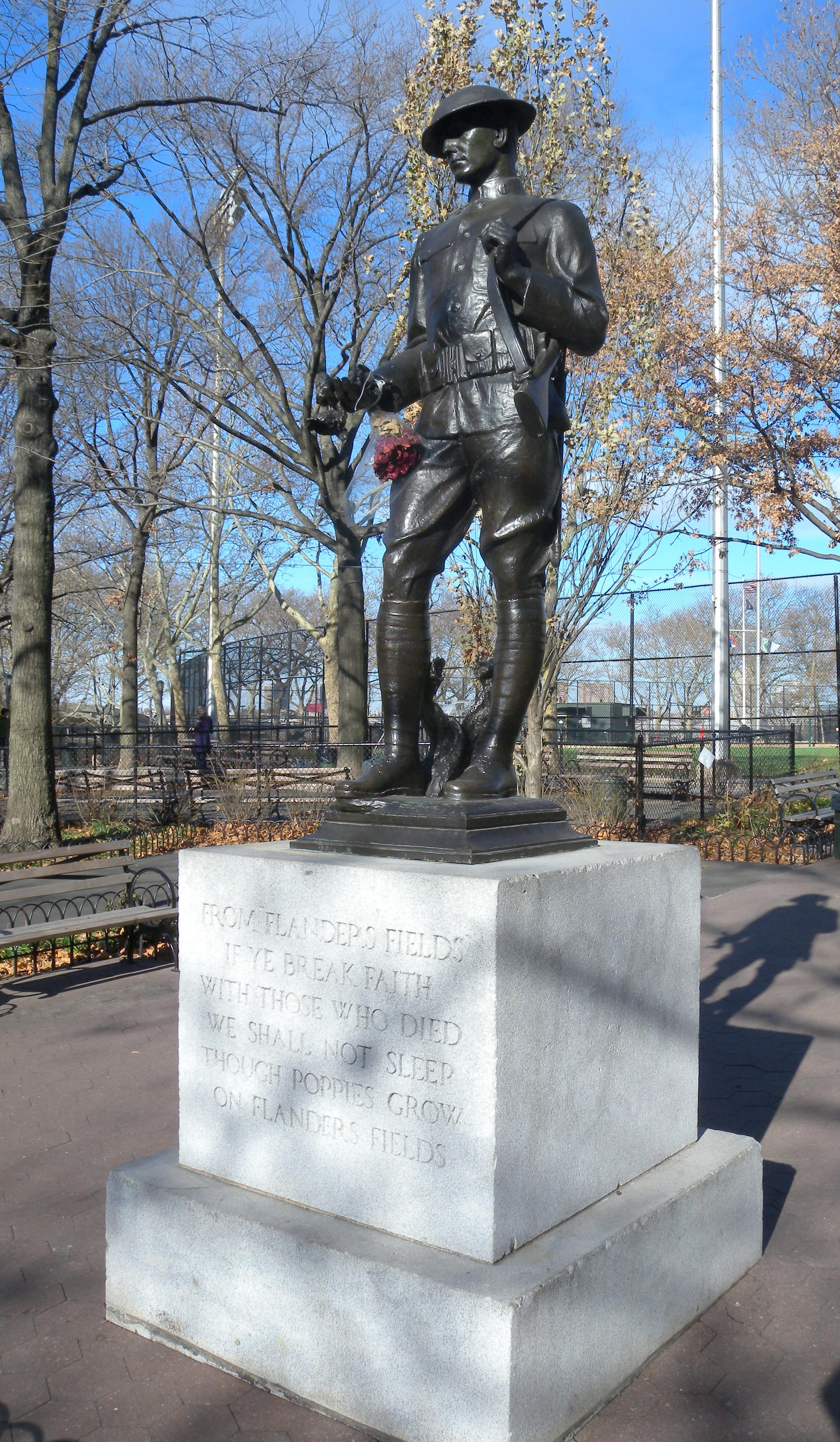
Flanders Field Memorial

The base of the sculpture bears part of the famous poem, In Flanders Fields,

If ye break faith with those who died
We shall not sleep, though poppies grow
On Flanders fields.

However, this is a misquotation (those, not us; died, not die; and In, not On), of the actual poem by John McCrae,

Take up our quarrel with the foe
To you from failing hands we throw
The torch; be yours to hold it high.
If ye break faith with us who die
We shall not sleep, though poppies grow
In Flanders fields.

== See also ==
- Clinton Park (disambiguation)
