= Vistas High School Program =

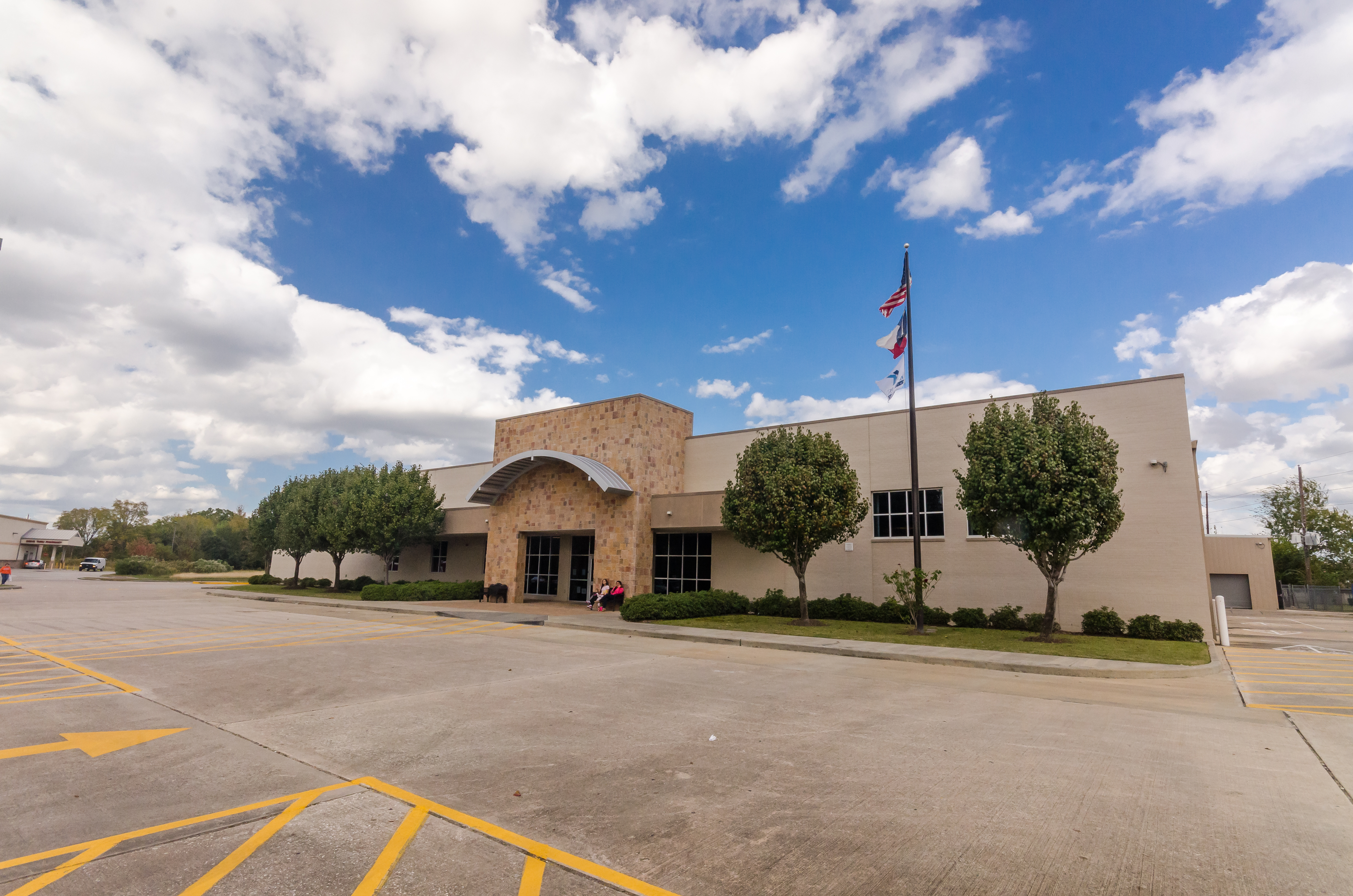

Location
- 12550 Bammel North Houston Road; Harris County, Texas; United States; 29.961183°N 95.497197°W

Information
- Type: Public, Alternative
- Motto: "A Relevant and Rigorous Curriculum"
- Established: August 16, 2006
- School district: Klein Independent School District
- Grades: 10 - 12
- Enrollment: about 300 (as of July 2007)
- Mascot: Vikings
- Website: Official site

Vistas High School Program is an alternative public high school program based in unincorporated Harris County, Texas, United States, and part of the Klein Independent School District. Vistas serves grades 9 through 12. The program has a Houston, Texas mailing address but is not located in the Houston city limits. The Director is Peggy Ekster.

== Academics ==
Vistas was created to provide resources for students who are at risk of not graduating, so they can work at an accelerated pace to complete high school. Only students who have spent a semester in a regular high school program are eligible for enrollment. Each student receives a wireless laptop; students may take on-line courses and/or complete a course in less time than at a traditional school. Faculty and students are screened to ensure a willingness to work as part of a team focused on the possibility of graduation for each student. Attaining the recommended high school diploma is the standard for all. Students who are graduated receive a diploma from their zoned high schools.

== High schools ==
Under the program are five high schools: Klein High School, Klein Cain High School, Klein Collins High School, Klein Forest High School and Klein Oak High School.
