= Devin Richardson =

American football player (born 1999)

Profile
- Position: Linebacker

Personal information
- Born: December 5, 1999 (age 26); Klein, Texas, U.S.
- Listed height: 6 ft 2 in (1.88 m)
- Listed weight: 229 lb (104 kg)

Career information
- High school: Klein
- College: New Mexico State (2018–2020); Texas (2021–2022); Washington State (2023)
- NFL draft: 2024: undrafted

Career history
- Seattle Seahawks (2024)*; BC Lions (2025)
- * Offseason or practice squad member only
- Stats at Pro Football Reference
- Stats at CFL.ca

Devin Richardson (born December 5, 1999) is an American professional football linebacker. He played college football at New Mexico State, Texas, and Washington State.

== Early life ==
Devin Richardson was born on December 5, 1999, in Klein, Texas. Growing up, he wanted to be a professional Call of Duty player. He played high school football at Klein High School, earning All-District 15-6A honors. In the class of 2018, 247Sports.com rated him the No. 109 outside linebacker in Texas and the No. 234 overall prospect in Texas.

== College career ==
Richardson first played college football for the New Mexico State Aggies of New Mexico State University. He played in four games as a true freshman in 2018, posting one solo tackle, before being redshirted. He started ten games as a redshirt freshman during the 2019 season, recording 24 solo tackles, 45 assisted tackles, two sacks, three forced fumbles, and one pass breakup. His three forced fumbles was the most on the team and also tied for the most among independents. Richardson was named a freshman All-American by the Football Writers Association of America. He appeared in one game during the COVID-19 shortened 2020 season, posting three solo tackles and five assisted tackles.

Richardson transferred to play for the Texas Longhorns of the University of Texas at Austin in 2021. He played in 11 games during the 2021 season primarily on special teams, recording three solo tackles and two assisted tackles. He appeared in nine games in 2022, totaling six solo tackles and five assisted tackles.

In 2023, Richardson transferred to play his final season of college football for the Washington State Cougars of Washington State University. He played in all 12 games, starting seven, during the 2023 season, recording 31 solo tackles, 31 assisted tackles, one sack, and one forced fumble.

== Professional career ==
Richardson signed with the Seattle Seahawks on May 13, 2024, after going undrafted in the 2024 NFL draft. He played in one preseason game, posting three tackles while allowing two catches for 13 yards. He was waived on August 19 and later signed to the practice squad on October 3. He was released by Seattle on October 8, 2024.

Richardson signed with the BC Lions of the Canadian Football League (CFL) on December 20, 2024. Richardson was cut at the end of training camp and was subsequently signed to the Lions' practice squad. Richardson later joined the Lions' active roster for one game in June but did not play, and was ultimately reassigned to the practice squad, where he spent the remainder of the 2025 CFL season until he was released on November 9, 2025.
