= Sloan Thomas =

American football player (born 1981)

No. 16
- Position: Wide receiver

Personal information
- Born: December 22, 1981 (age 44); Clarksville, Tennessee, U.S.
- Listed height: 6 ft 2 in (1.88 m)
- Listed weight: 200 lb (91 kg)

Career information
- High school: Klein (Klein, Texas)
- College: Texas
- NFL draft: 2004: 7th round, 211th overall pick

Career history
- Houston Texans (2004–2005)*; Tennessee Titans (2005); New York Jets (2006)*; Seattle Seahawks (2006)*; New York Jets (2006)*
- * Offseason or practice squad member only
- Stats at Pro Football Reference

Sloan Thomas (born December 22, 1981) is an American former professional football wide receiver from the National Football League (NFL). He went to Klein High School in Klein, Texas. He played in 46 games for the University of Texas, starting 20 contests. He caught 88 passes (ranked 10th on the school's career-record list) for 1,362 yards and 12 touchdowns (tied for seventh on the school record list). He was selected by the Houston Texans in the seventh round of the 2004 NFL draft. On August 31, 2006, Thomas was claimed off of waivers by the New York Jets. He was cut during the next training camp. He also spent time with the Seattle Seahawks in 2006.
