= Klein Independent School District =

School district in Harris County, Texas, U.S.

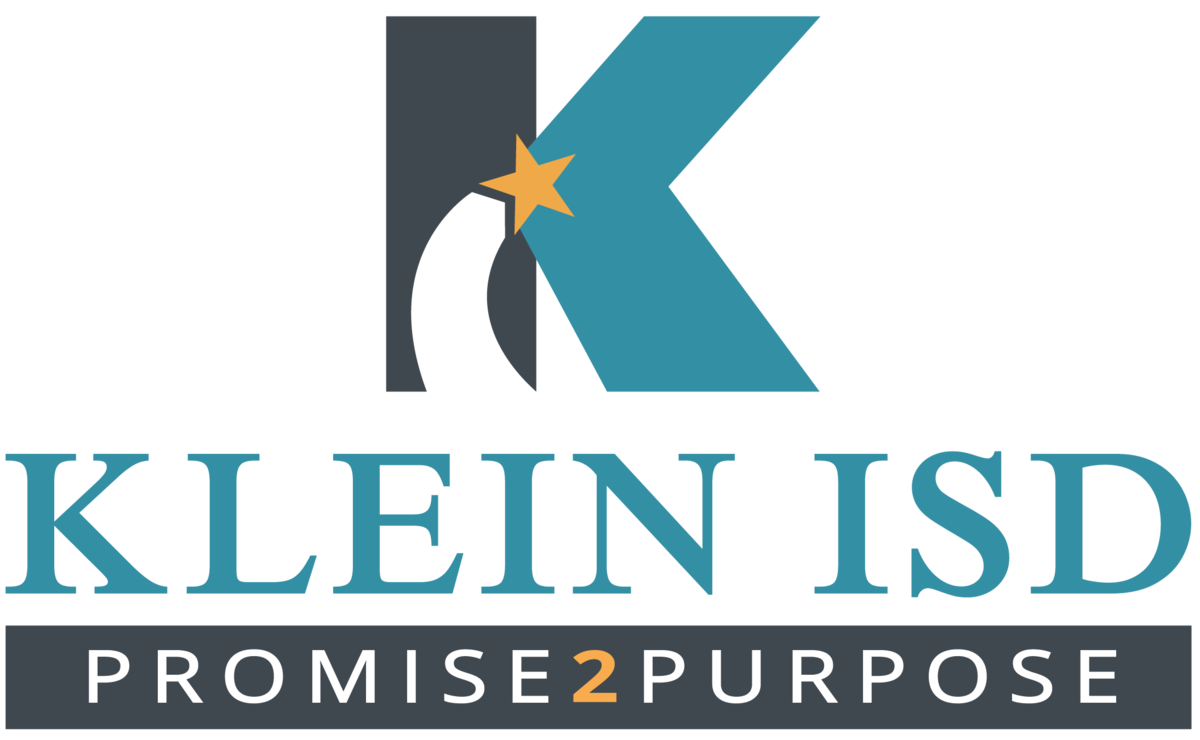

Address
- 7200 Spring Cypress Rd Klein, Texas; United States

District information
- Type: Public
- Grades: Pre-K/EC through 12
- Established: March 1938
- Superintendent: Jenny McGown
- Governing agency: Texas Education Agency
- Schools: 53
- Budget: $641.6 million (2021–2022)
- NCES District ID: 4825740

Students and staff
- Students: 52,437 (2024–2025)
- Teachers: 3,564.11
- Staff: 7,869.72
- Student–teacher ratio: 14.71

Other information
- Website: kleinisd.net

Klein Independent School District (Klein ISD) is a school district that covers 87.5 square miles (227 km^{2}) in Harris County, Texas, United States. It became an independent school district in 1938. Almost all of the territory is unincorporated; a small portion of Houston is within the district. In the 2020–2021 school year, Klein ISD had 52,824 students. Klein ISD is part of the taxation base for the Lone Star College System. As of 2022, Jenny McGown is Superintendent of Schools.

The district has 33 elementary schools (including a Pre-K designated school), ten intermediate schools, and five high schools. For the 2024–25 school year, the district received a score of 86 out of 100 from the Texas Education Agency.

== History ==
Rural High School District No. 1 was formed in July 1928 as a result of the consolidation of five common school districts, including French School, the schools of Hildebrandt, Oak Grove, Willow Creek, Kothman, Harrel, Fuchs, and the Kohrville School for black children. The district became Klein Independent School District in 1938, named after Adam Klein, who led many German immigrants into the area in 1854. It is board policy that all high schools include the name 'Klein' in honor of the district's namesake. After Klein High School's current building was constructed in 1963, the original Klein High was used as the administration building. The current Klein ISD Central Office building opened in 1981.

In 1971, Donald Collins became the district's superintendent and served until his retirement in 2000. Under his tenure, the number of schools in the district rose from 6 to 28. In 2001, Klein Collins High School was named in his honor.

Jim Cain served as superintendent from 2004 to 2016. Formerly a director of school administration in Klein ISD before moving to Fort Bend ISD, Dr. Cain returned to Klein and worked as the assistant/associate superintendent for administration. In 2017, Klein Cain High School was named after him.

== Communities ==
Klein ISD serves unincorporated portions of northern Harris County, Texas, and includes the communities and neighborhoods of Klein, Kohrville, Louetta, and parts of North Houston. Some areas within the Spring and Tomball postal designations, and a portion of "Acres Homes" within the city limits of Houston are also served by Klein ISD.

The Klein ISD Board of Trustees passed a resolution at their January 2016 meeting regarding renaming the 88 square miles encompassing Klein ISD as Klein, Tx. The resolution includes the following:

1. Recommends that residents living within the district boundaries refer to their community as Klein, Texas;
2. Recommends that citizens within zip codes 77379, 77389 and 77391 use Klein, Texas as their address; and
3. Directs that all Klein ISD buildings and facilities be identified as being in Klein, Texas.

By Texas legislative action in 1977, the area inside the boundaries of the Klein ISD was designated as Klein, Texas.

== Students ==
=== Academics ===
Percent of students reaching or exceeding performance standards on STAAR tests
Year	Approaches or above	Meets or above	Masters	Data
2025	80%	56%	26%	
2024	80%	56%	25%	
2023	81%	55%	23%	
2022	79%	54%	28%	
2021	74%	47%	22%	
2019	81%	54%	26%	
2018	80%	53%	25%	
2017	81%	57%	26%	
Year	Satisfactory or above	Postsecondary Readiness	Advanced	Data
2016	81%	54%	22%	
2015	83%	50%	21%	
2014	83%	50%	19%	
Year	Phase-in 1 or above	Final or above	Advanced	Data
2013	83%	42%	17%	
2012	84%	40%	16%	

For each school year, the Texas Education Agency rates school district performance based on statistical data. Beginning in 2017–2018, the agency calculates a score for each district from 0 to 100 which is used to assign a grade from A to F. School districts did not receive a score or rating for 2019–2020 or for 2020–2021 due to the COVID-19 pandemic. Other than these two years, the district has received a B grade from the Texas Education Agency in every year under this system through 2024–2025.

From 2013 to 2017, the agency rated school districts as either Met Standard, Met Alternative Standard, or Improvement Required. Klein ISD received a Met Standard rating for each year under this system. School districts did not receive a rating for the 2011–2012 school year as the agency transitioned from using the Texas Assessment of Knowledge and Skills (TAKS) to the State of Texas Assessments of Academic Readiness (STAAR) as the basis for their accountability ratings.

From 1996 to 2011, the agency rated school districts as either Exemplary, Recognized, Academically Acceptable, or Academically Unacceptable. From 2004 to 2008, the district was rated Academically Acceptable, and from 2009 to 2011, the district received a Recognized rating. School districts did not receive a rating for the 2002–2003 school year as the agency transitioned from using the Texas Assessment of Academic Skills (TAAS) to the TAKS standardized test. The district was rated Academically Acceptable from 1996 to 2001 and Recognized in 2002.

On January 18, 2019, Klein ISD was a finalist for the H-E-B Excellence in Education Award.

=== Demographics ===
In the 2024–2025 school year, the district had a total of 52,437 students, starting from early childhood/pre-kindergarten education through grade 12. The district had 3,564.11 teachers and 4,305.61 additional staff for a total of 7,869.72 employees on a full-time equivalent basis. The district's student to teacher ratio was 14.71. The ethnic distribution of students was:

- 17.7% African American
- 46.7% Hispanic
- 23.9% White
- 0.3% American Indian
- 7.4% Asian
- 0.1% Pacific Islander
- 3.9% Two or More Races

54.9% of students were listed as economically disadvantaged, 15.7% received special education services, and 22.2% were English-language learners.

Klein ISD's student enrollment has increased significantly across multiple decades. In the 2017–2018 school year, there were 52,896 students enrolled. There were 44,695 students in 2009–2010, and 35,474 students in 2003–2004.

== Bonds ==
Klein ISD, with voter approval, has sold bonds in 2004, 2008, and 2015 to provide funding for large infrastructure projects. The 2004 bond referendum approved the sale of $224 million and included renovations of existing buildings and the construction of Vistas High School and Benignus Elementary School. All projects associated with the 2004 bond started in 2005 and have been completed. On May 10, 2008, a bond referendum for $646.9 million was passed with approximately 52% (4,732 of 9,152) of the ballots for it. The bond was to create new schools, including Blackshear Elementary, Bernshausen Elementary, and Klein Cain High School. In May 2015, Klein ISD held another bond referendum for $498.1 million, which passed with around 77% (4,571 of 6,033) of the ballots for it. The bond apportioned $283.6 million for construction projects, including $121.9 million to supplement 2008 bond funding for Klein Cain High School, $47.1 million for Hofius Intermediate, and $26.2 million for Fox Elementary. Other bond projects were classroom additions, security upgrades, technology infrastructure, and facility renovations. Bonds from the 2015 referendum were sold in bundles from 2015 to 2020. The district completed construction of Klein Cain High School in 2017 and Hofius Intermediate in 2018. Some classroom additions and renovations were removed from the 2015 bond project and the funds were used to repair facilities damaged by flooding. In May 2022 for the 2022 bond, "Klein ISD voters made district history as they approved $895,350,000 million in bond funding."

== Curriculum ==
Klein ISD generally offers uniform curriculum across all its elementary schools, intermediate schools, and high schools.

=== College classes ===
The Klein district offers Dual Credit (DC) courses in which high school teachers who teach these courses are also college professors. These students earn both high school credit and college credit, while staying at their high school. Klein ISD also has a partnership with Lone Star College in which students can also take classes at Lone Star College–University Park, earning from three to 57 college credit hours. Dual credit courses offered in the district include English 3, English 4, U.S. History, U.S. Government, Art History, Independent Study/Math, Pre-Calculus, Biology, Anatomy & Physiology, Correctional Services, and Court Systems & Practices.

Klein ISD also offers many Advanced Placement (AP) classes at all five of their high schools in math, science, English, social studies, fine arts, and foreign language courses. Students who enroll in the course (approved by College Board) may receive college credit by receiving a passing score on an exam taken at the end of the year. At the middle school and high school level, Pre-AP classes are offered in all schools to prepare students for future AP courses.

The district offers the International Baccalaureate Diploma Program (IB) for 11th and 12th grade students at Klein Oak High School. The program accepts applications from any student in Klein ISD. Students must complete courses within each of the six IB subjects, write an essay based on independent research, complete the Theory of Knowledge course, and complete either a service, activity, or creative project.

=== Fine arts ===
Klein ISD offers fine arts courses in band, choir, dance, elementary music, orchestra, theatre art, and visual art. The district was listed as one of the 2020 Best Communities for Music Education awarded by the NAMM Foundation. The district was designated a 2019 District of Distinction by the Texas Art Education Association.

=== STEAM education ===
Klein ISD operates the STEAM (the Science, Technology, Engineering, Arts with Math) Express, a bus that travels around the district with a drop down stage, teaching students about STEAM careers through a variety of activities. In 2019–2020, the bus visited 8094 students, 560 educators, and 270 members of the community.

== Schools ==
=== Current campuses ===
In Klein ISD, grades pre-kindergarten through grade 5 are considered a part of elementary school, grades 6 through 8 are in intermediate school, and grades 9 through 12 a part of high school. The district also offers a Pre-Kindergarten campus for certain areas of the district for students who have not yet entered elementary school. Additionally, Klein ISD offers the Vistas High School Program for high school students who are at risk for not graduating. The program is offered to all Klein ISD high school students who are admitted based on an application and interview process. For the 2020–2021 school year, Klein ISD operated 33 elementary schools, ten intermediate schools, and five high schools.

Klein ISD creates attendance zones for neighborhoods within the boundaries of the district. All neighborhoods are zoned to a specific elementary school, intermediate school, and high school. When a new school opens, or a school becomes overcrowded, the district begins realigning and rezoning certain neighborhoods to ensure that there is balance among all schools. Students must attend the assigned schools for their neighborhood, with the exception of students who attend the International Baccalaureate program at Klein Oak High School.

==== High schools ====
- Klein High School was the first high school constructed in the Klein district, built in its current location in 1963 with a full reconstruction completed in 2014.
- Klein Forest High School was the second high school built in Klein ISD in 1979.
- Klein Oak High School was the third high school built in 1982. It is the only school in the Klein district that offers the International Baccalaureate program.
- Klein Collins High School was the fourth high school built in 2001. The high school was named after Don Collins, a former superintendent of Klein ISD.
- Klein Cain High School is the fifth and newest high school, built in 2017. The high school was named after Jim Cain, a former superintendent who retired in 2015.
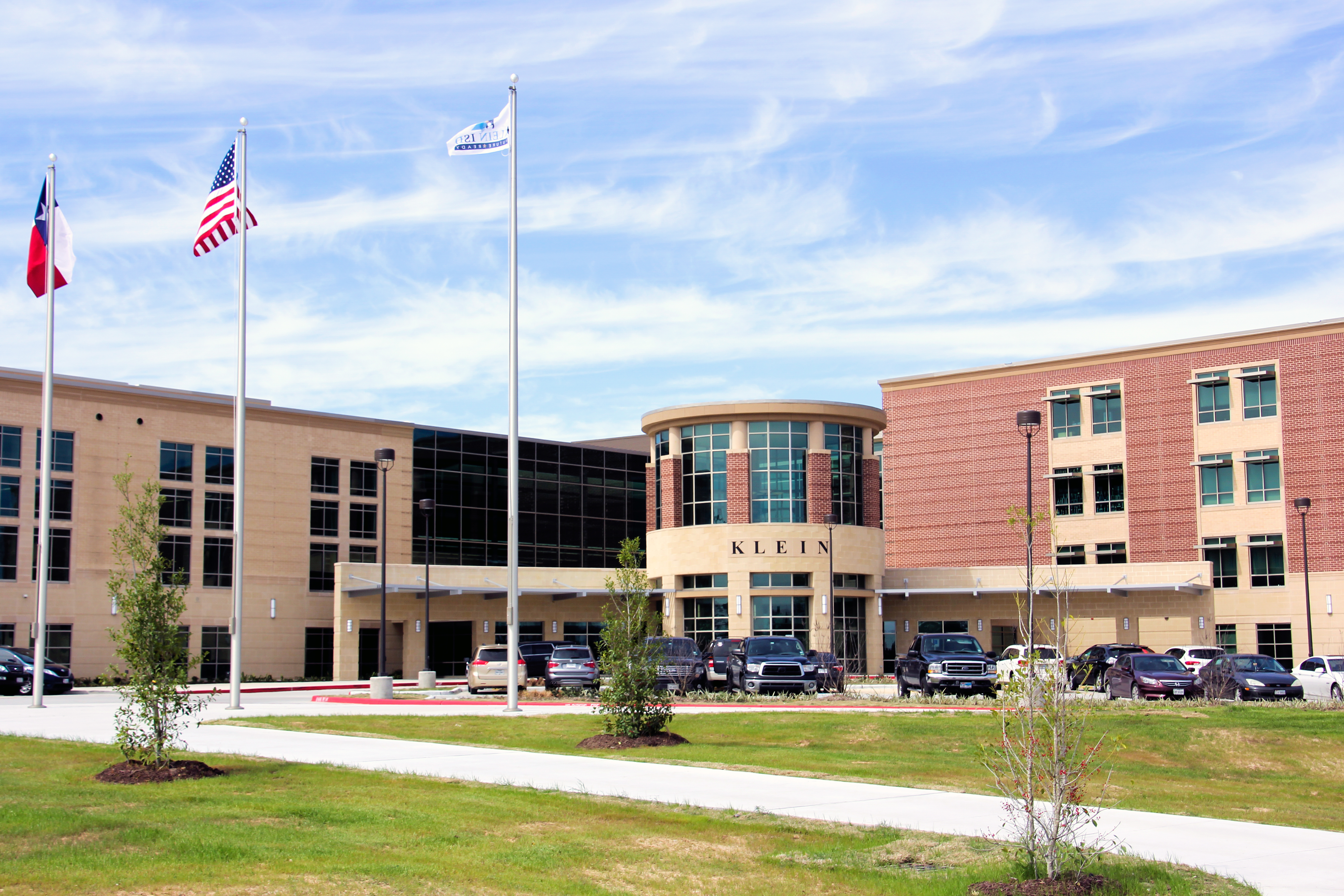
Klein High School

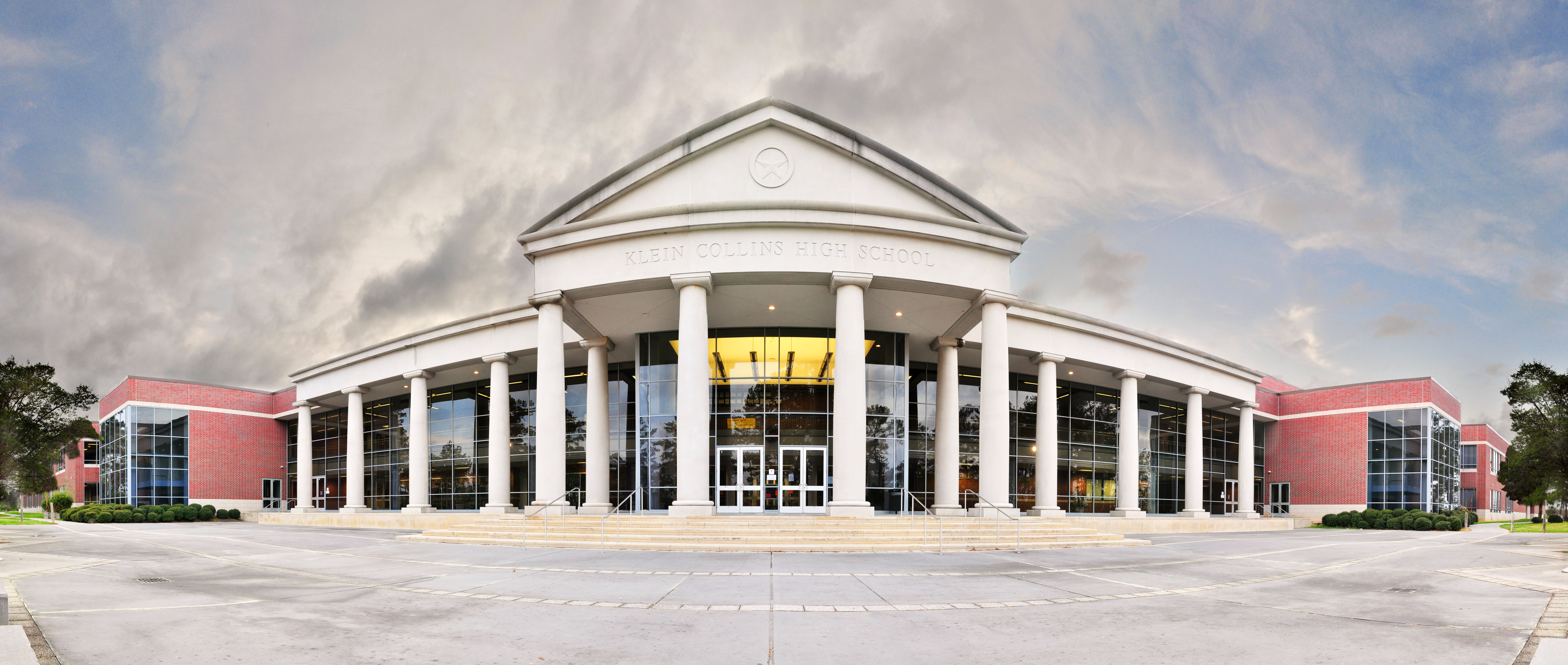
Klein Collins High School

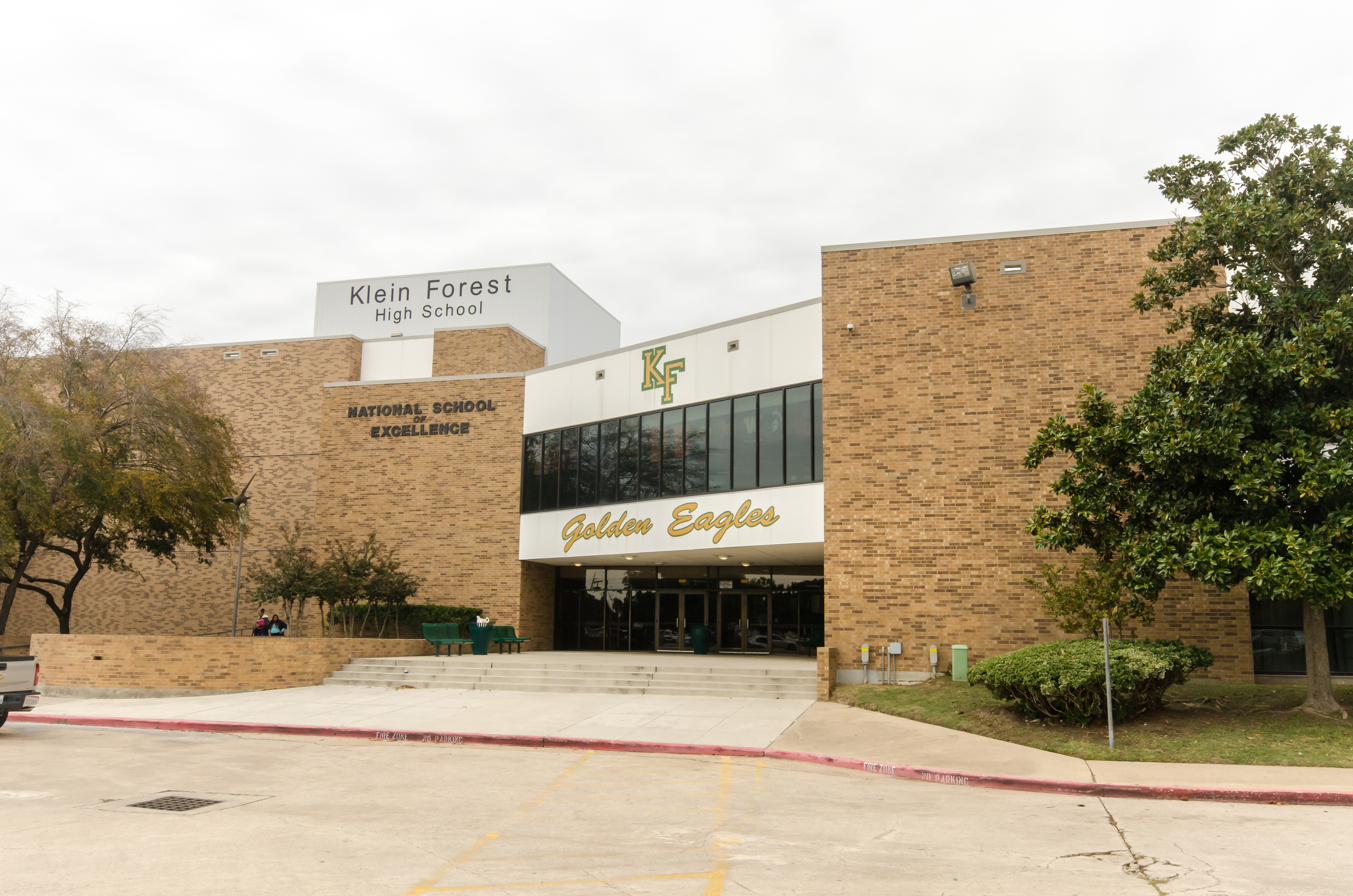
Klein Forest High School

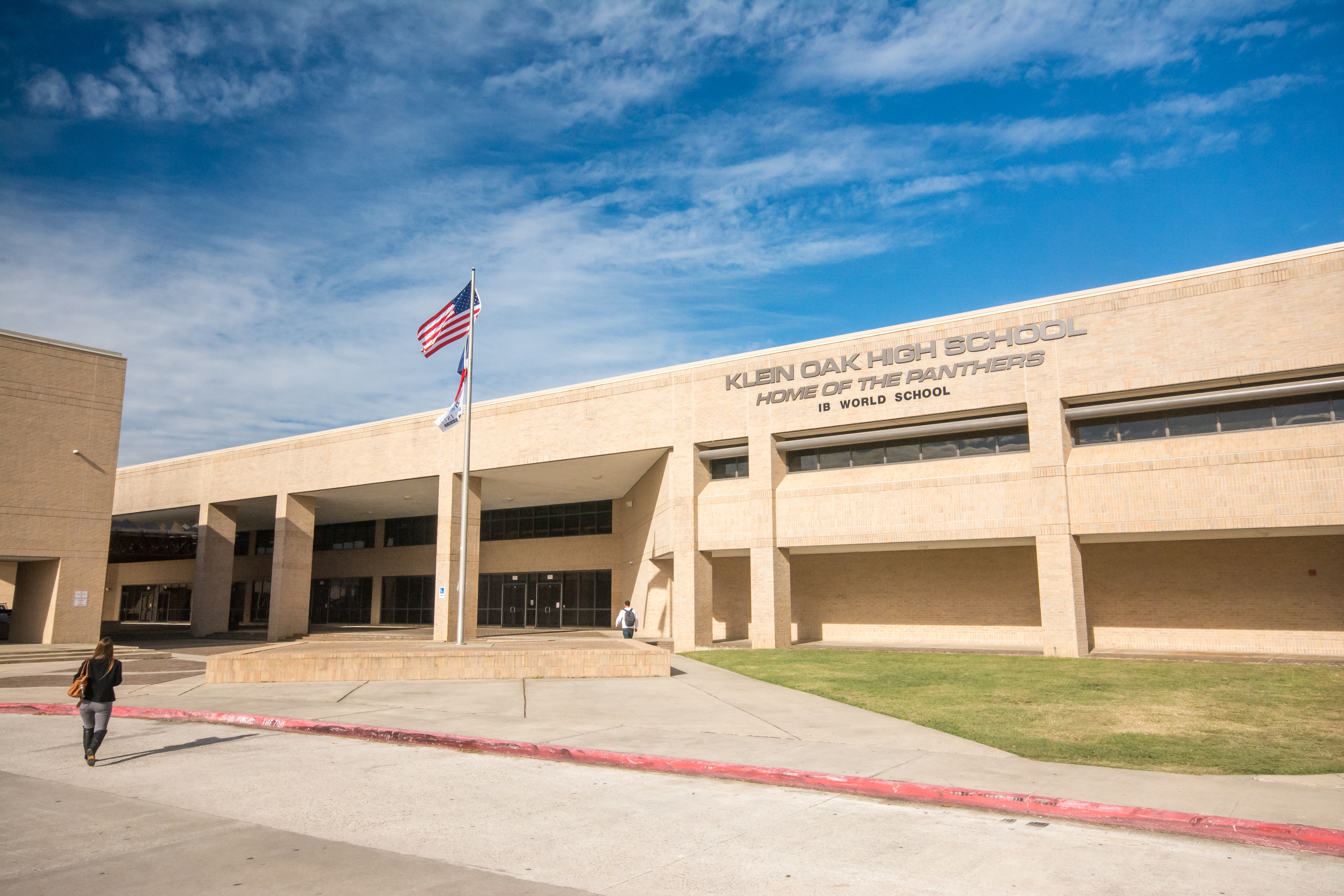
Klein Oak High School

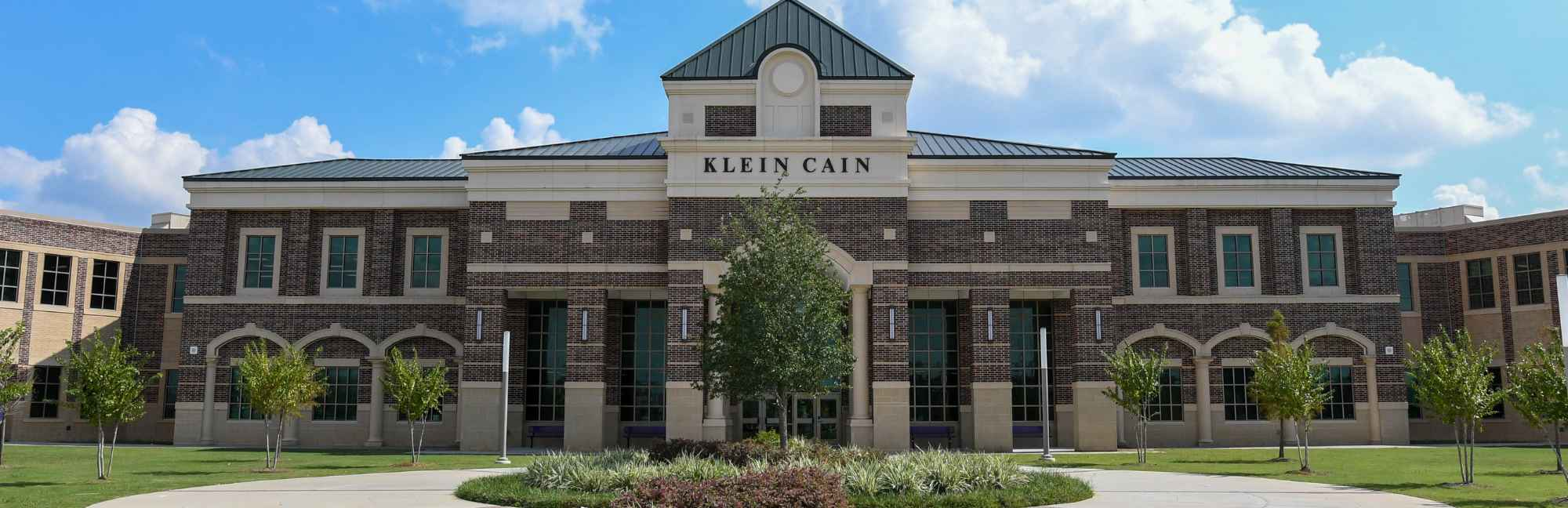
Klein Cain High School

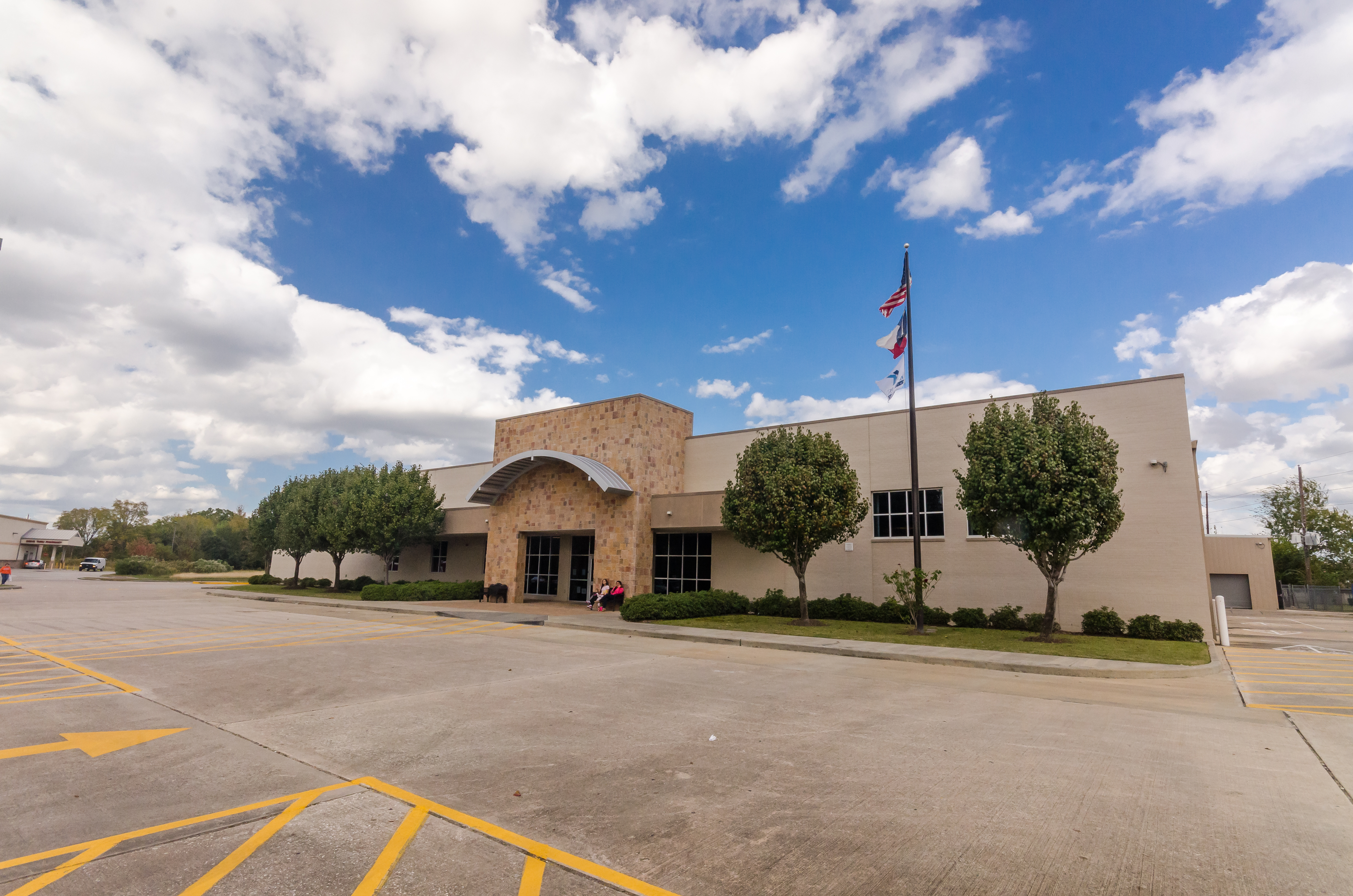
Vistas High School Program

==== Intermediate schools ====
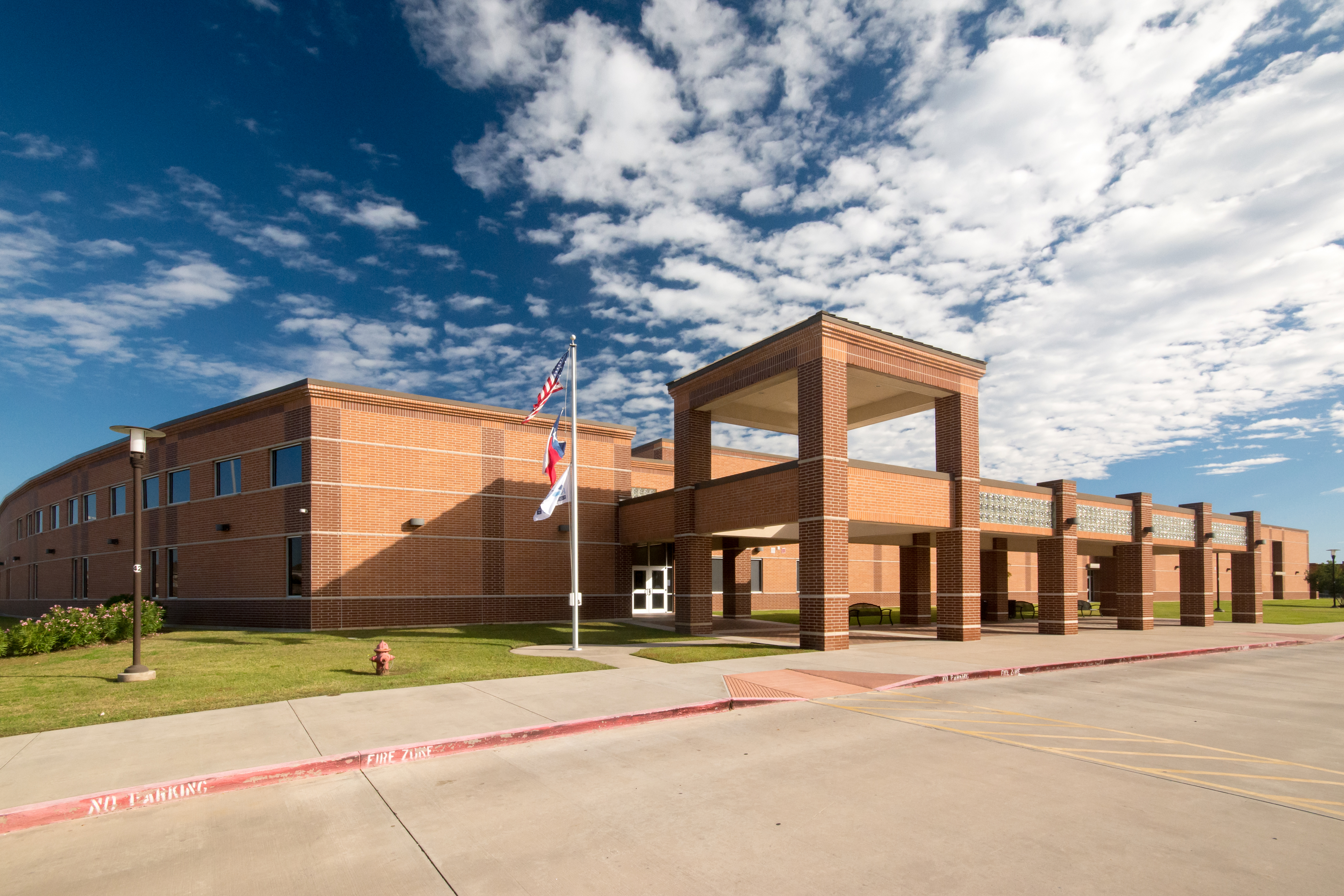
Krimmel Intermediate

- Doerre Intermediate School (Est. 1984)
- Hildebrandt Intermediate School (Est. 1973)
- Hofius Intermediate School (Est. 2018)
- Kleb Intermediate School (Est. 1993)
- Klein Intermediate School (Est. 1984)
- Krimmel Intermediate School (Est. 2007)
- Schindewolf Intermediate School (Est. 2002)
- Strack Intermediate School (Est. 1977)
- Ulrich Intermediate School (Est. 2010)
- Wunderlich Intermediate School (Est. 1975)

==== Elementary schools ====
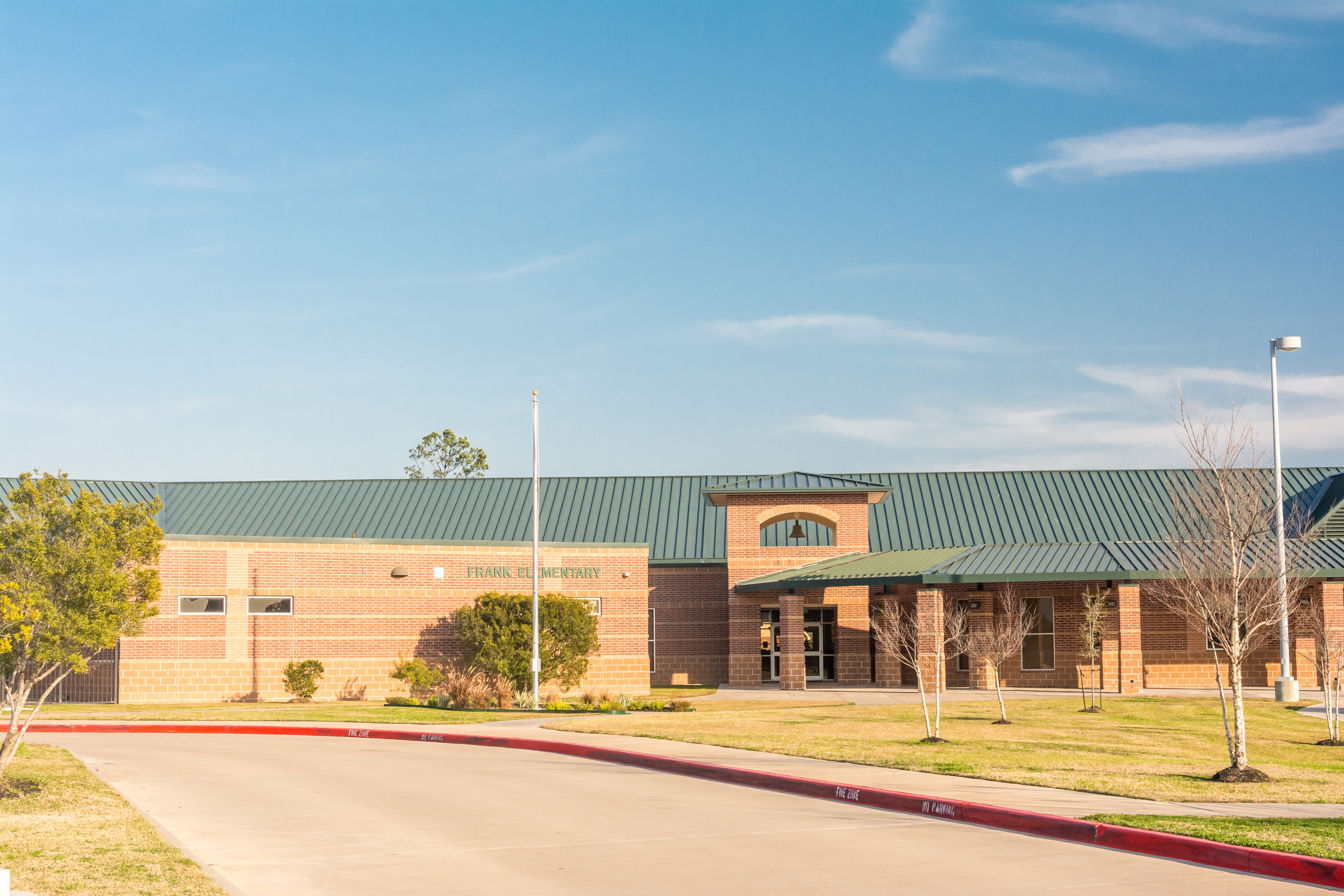
Frank Elementary

- Benfer Elementary School (Est. 1977)
- Benignus Elementary School (Est. 2006)
- Bernshausen Elementary School (Est. 2012)
- Blackshear Elementary School (Est. 2010)
- Brill Elementary School (Est. 1978)
- Ehrhardt Elementary School (Est. 1979)
- Eiland Elementary School (Est. 1993)
- Epps Island Elementary School (Est. 1973)
- Grace England Early Childhood Center (Est. 2012)
- Fox Elementary School (Est. 2020)
- Frank Elementary School (Est. 2007)
- French Elementary School (Est. 2015)
- Greenwood Forest Elementary School (Est. 1971)
- Hassler Elementary School (Est. 1999)
- Haude Elementary School (Est. 1971)
- Kaiser Elementary School (Est. 1978)
- Klenk Elementary School (Est. 1992)
- Kohrville Elementary School (Est. 2002)
- Krahn Elementary School (Est. 1983)
- Kreinhop Elementary School (Est. 2004)
- Kuehnle Elementary School (Est. 1989)
- Lemm Elementary School (Est. 1980)
- Mahaffey Elementary School (Est. 2016)
- McDougle Elementary School (Est. 2004)
- Metzler Elementary School (Est. 2005)
- Mittelstädt Elementary School (Est. 1991)
- Mueller Elementary School (Est. 2009)
- Nitsch Elementary School (Est. 1980)
- Northampton Elementary School (Est. 1971)
- Roth Elementary School (Est. 1985)
- Schultz Elementary School (Est. 1994)
- Theiss Elementary School (Est. 1974)
- Zwink Elementary School (Est. 2012)

==== Other campuses ====
- Klein Alternative Education Center (Est. 1994)
- Klein ISD Therapeutic & Readiness Center (Est. 1996; formerly known as Klein ISD Therapeutic Education Program)
- Klein ISD Flex School

=== Former campuses ===
- Klein Intermediate School: Situated next to what is currently Klein High School, the original Klein Intermediate, not to be confused with the existing one, opened in 1967. It became the Klein HS ninth grade building in 1975, and later became Kleb Intermediate School, again not to be confused with the existing one, in 1981. Beginning in 1993 it served as the Klein Annex, an alternative education facility for students with persistent and serious behavior issues. It was torn down and its functions moved to a new building on an adjacent site, while the site of the original building became playing fields.
- Klein Elementary School: Located next to the original Klein High School on Spring Cypress Road, Klein Elementary School opened in 1940 and was renamed Klein Middle School in 1971. The building was demolished in 2007 due to safety concerns. A new building was constructed on the site which became the Network Operations Center.
- Garden City Elementary School: Located on W. Montgomery Road just south of the present day Nitsch Elementary School, this school opened in 1956 and closed in the 1970s. According to topographic maps of the area, the building was located in the same spot of the current Paradise Funeral Home building.
- Recreation Acres Elementary School: This school served southern part of district and opened in 1949. Site located at the current intersection of Antione Dr. and Chippewa Blvd. According to topographic maps of the area, the school became Midwest Bible Institute before becoming Mary Immaculate Preschool. Original building burned down in 2009 and a new school was built on the site in 2012.
- Kohrville School: Located at the present-day corner of Spring-Cypress and Huffsmith-Kohrville Road, the school opened in 1895 and served as the district's black school during the period of de jure segregation. In 1928, the school was combined with Rural High School #1. The school re-opened in a new facility in 1949 and operated until the district integrated its schools in 1967. The former school served as a community center for several years before being converted into a museum.
- Klein ISD Annex: Starting in 1993, the original Klein Intermediate/KHS 9th Grade Building building served as the Klein ISD Annex until 2011 when the K.E. Kaufman Alternative Education Center was built. The building still stood until 2 years later in 2013 during the KHS renovations.
- Klein ISD Teaching & Learning Center: Located on 4411 Louetta Rd, was built in 2004 and was replaced with the Klein ISD Thearapeutic & Readiness Center in 2021

== See also ==
- List of school districts in Texas
