= Nick Mikolajchak =

American baseball player (born 1997)

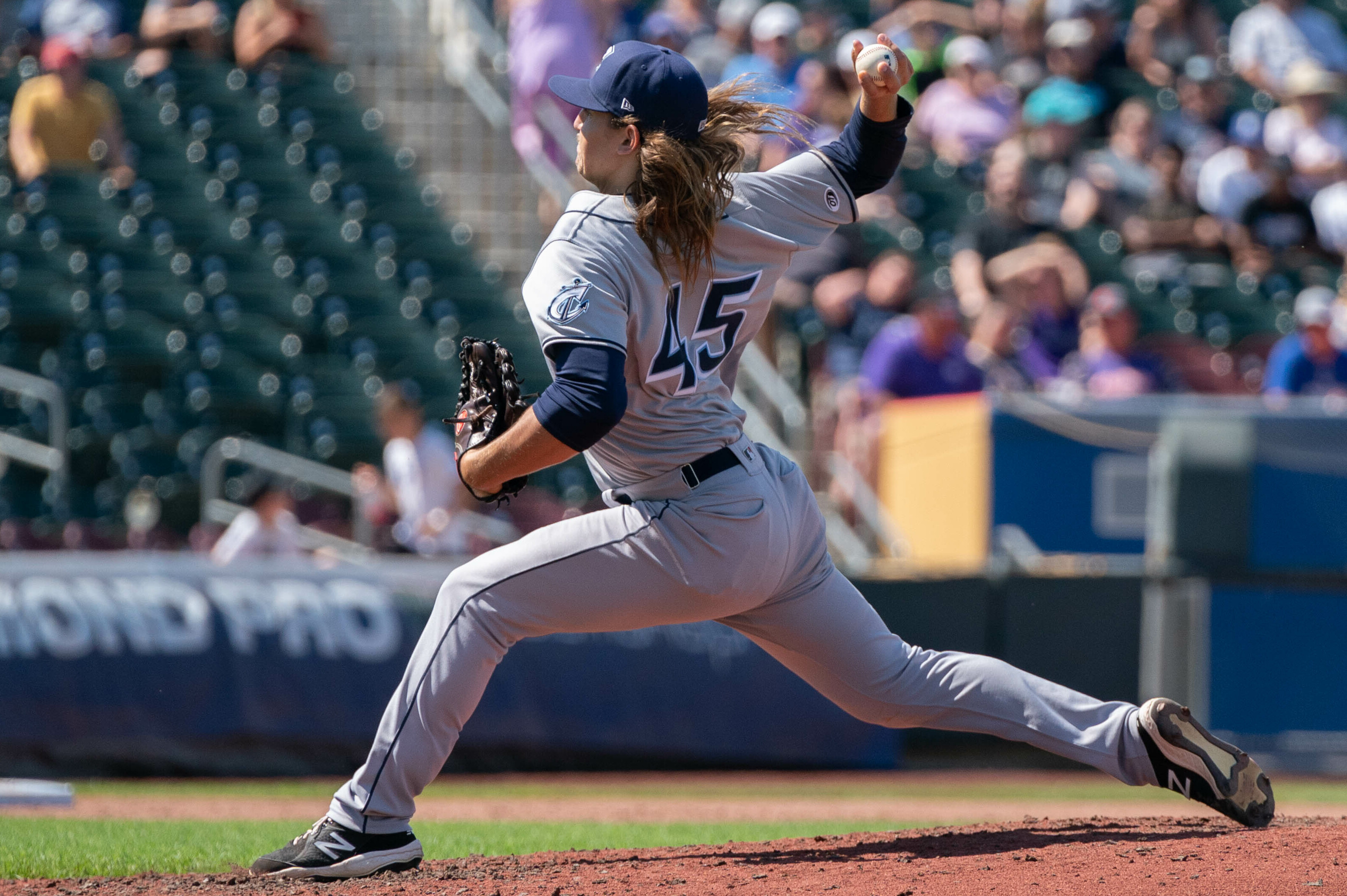
- Mikolajchak with the Columbus Clippers in 2022

Free agent
- Pitcher
- Born: November 21, 1997 (age 28); Houston, Texas, U.S.
- Bats: Right Throws: Right

Nicholas Austin Mikolajchak (MIKE-ah-la-chek; born November 21, 1997) is an American professional baseball pitcher who is a free agent.

== Amateur career ==
Mikolajchak went to Klein Collins High School in Harris County, Texas, where he played baseball and basketball. He was First–Team All–District in his junior season and District MVP in his senior season of high school. He committed to Sam Houston State to play college baseball starting in 2016.

In 2016 as a freshman, Mikolajchak worked exclusively as a reliever and a closer for the team, posting a 3.38 ERA and an 0–4 record in 32 games. As a sophomore in 2017 for Sam Houston State, he played in 22 games, starting nine and closing two of them. He went 5–4 with an earned run average of 4.19 in 73 innings. Mikolajchak played collegiate summer baseball for the Falmouth Commodores of the Cape Cod Baseball League in 2018, pitching in 8 games and scoring an earned run average of 1.84. For Mikolajchak's junior season in 2019, he pitched in 23 games, starting and closing 7 games each. He pitched 64 2/3 innings and compiled a 5–4 record with 74 strikeouts, improving from 32 in his freshman year.

== Professional career ==
=== Cleveland Indians / Guardians ===
Mikolajchak was drafted by the Cleveland Indians in the 11th round with the 340th overall pick, of the 2019 MLB draft, becoming the third player from Sam Houston State to be drafted at that point.

Mikolajchak elected to forgo his senior season at Sam Houston State and signed with the Indians on June 14, 2019. In his first professional season with the Indians, Mikolajchak played for two of the Indians' minor league affiliates, combining for a 1–1 record with an 0.36 earned run average and 36 strikeouts across 17 games. He did not play in a game in 2020 due to the cancellation of the minor league season because of the COVID-19 pandemic.

Mikolajchak made the Indians' alternate site roster for the beginning of the 2021 season. He spent the year with the Double-A Akron RubberDucks, recording a 2–5 record and 3.18 ERA with 57 strikeouts and 8 saves in 39 2/3 innings of work. Mikolajchak played the 2022 season with the Triple-A Columbus Clippers, working to a 5–2 record and 3.04 ERA with 50 strikeouts and 6 saves in 50 1/3 innings pitched across 47 appearances.

In spring training the following year, Mikolajchak seemed poised for a spot in the Guardians’ bullpen after pitching to a 1.93 ERA over seven appearances. However, he left an appearance against the Arizona Diamondbacks on March 18, 2023, and was later diagnosed with a sprained right ulnar collateral ligament. He returned to action in 2024 with Columbus, where he posted a 3-1 record and 3.50 ERA with 26 strikeouts over 36 innings of work.

Mikolajchak made 26 appearances for Triple-A Columbus in 2025, registering a 1-2 record and 4.75 ERA with 25 strikeouts and four saves across 30 1/3 innings pitched. Mikolajchak was released by the Guardians organization on July 14, 2025.

=== York Revolution ===
On July 25, 2025, Mikolajchak signed with the York Revolution of the Atlantic League of Professional Baseball. In 19 appearances for the Revolution, he posted an 0-1 record and 1.93 ERA with 27 strikeouts and one save across 18 2/3 innings pitched. With York, Mikolajchak won the Atlantic League championship.

On April 8, 2026, Mikolajchak re-signed with the Revolution.

=== Minnesota Twins ===
On May 29, 2026, Mikolajchak signed a minor league contract with the Minnesota Twins. He made nine appearances for the Double–A Wichita Wind Surge, registering a 1–0 record and 7.71 ERA with four strikeouts across 11 2/3 innings pitched. Mikolajchak was released by the Twins organization on July 13.
