= Kohrville, Texas =

Unincorporated community in Texas, US

Coordinates: 30°00′44″N 95°35′08″W

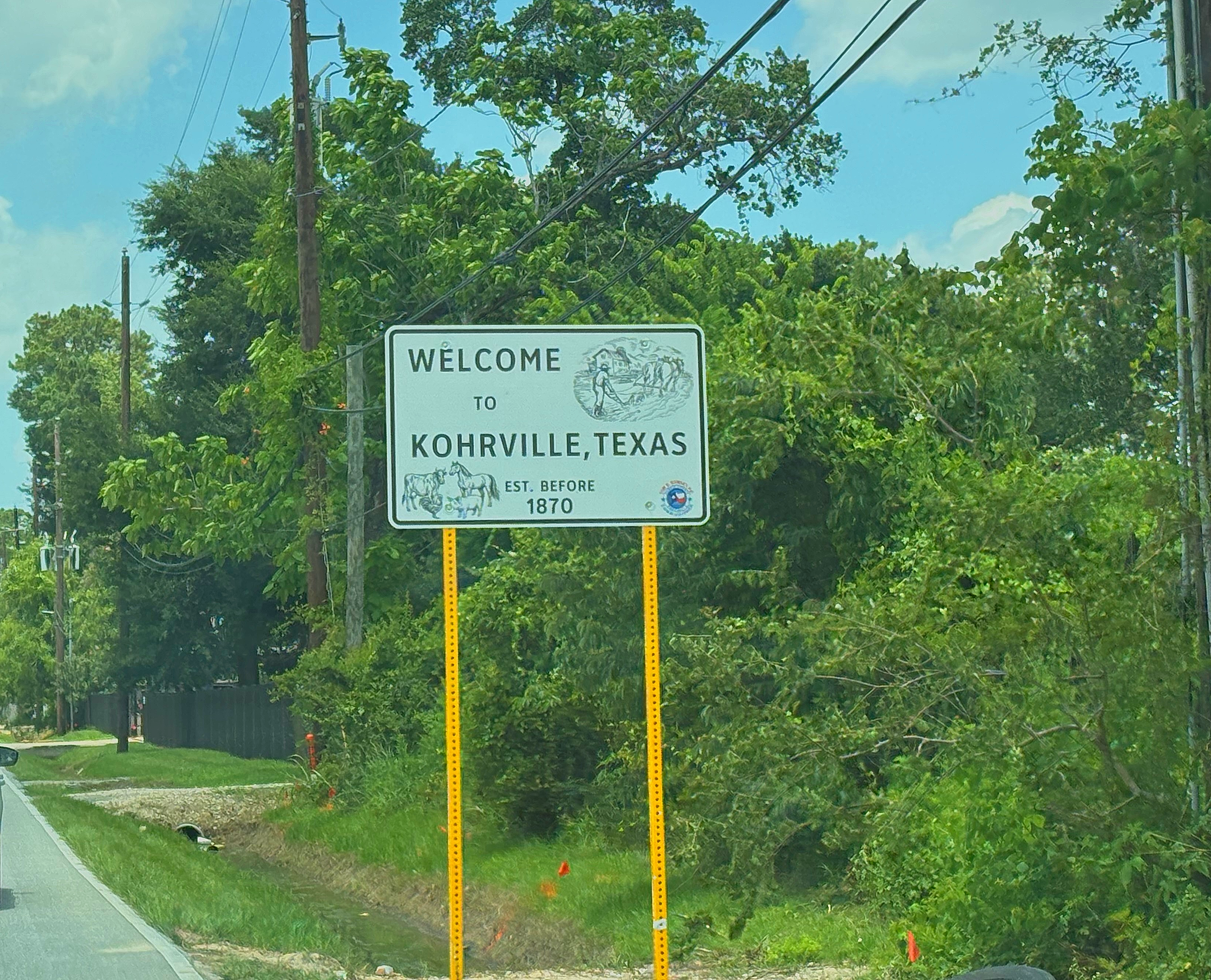
A sign that welcomes you to Kohrville.

Kohrville, also named Korville and Pilotville, is an unincorporated community in Harris County, Texas, United States.

== History ==
The town was founded before 1870 by freed slaves from Alabama, and named after a German immigrant called Paul Kohrmann, who was the first postmaster of the town. The first post office was established in the town in 1881. By the 1960s the town was home to more than 100 families, though economically deprived. By the 1990s the population had fallen to around 50.

In 2016, the historic African-American cemetery at Kohrville, established in 1881, received state recognition as a state historical monument.

== Education ==
Land in Kohrville is served by Klein Independent School District.

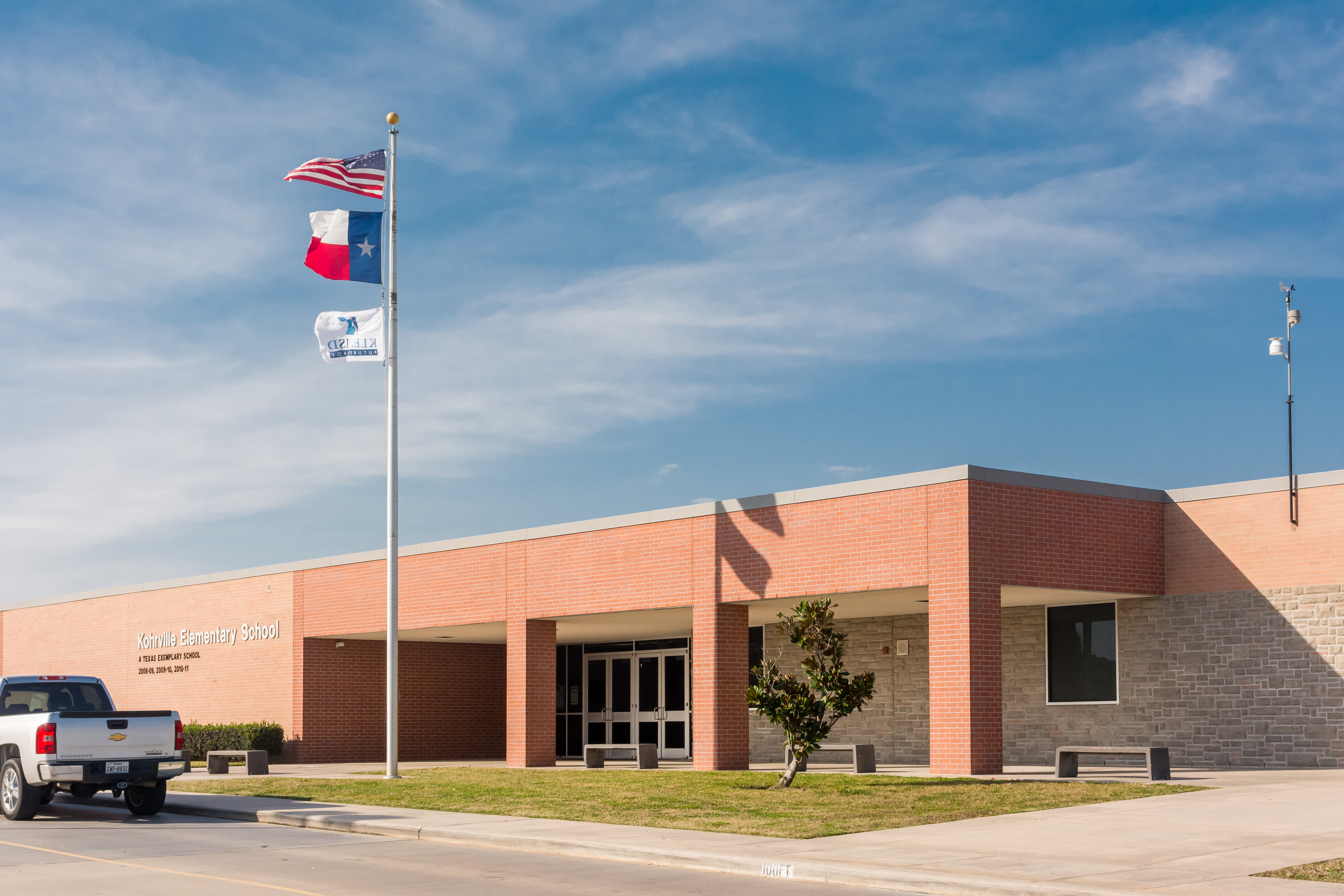
Present day Kohrville Elementary School, built in 2002

The Kohrville School, originally located on Hufsmith-Kohrville Road, was called the "little school on the hill" by the Kohrville citizens. The first Kohrville School was founded in 1895 by Deacons Thomas Amos and Doug Cossey. This was in the day when black and white students were taught in separate schools. In 1928, Kohrville was consolidated with other area common schools to form Rural High #1, which became Klein I./S.D. in 1938. In 1949, a new Kohrville School was built, which is pictured here. The architect was the firm of Alfred C. Finn, a famous Houston architect who designed many famous buildings in Houston, Galveston, and other Texas cities in that period. He also designed the San Jacinto Monument. Once Klein schools were fully integrated in 1967, the Kohrville School closed. For several years it was used as a community center.

In the spring of 2000, the Kohrville School building was relocated to the Klein Museum complex for restoration, Around the same time, Klein ISD planned a new elementary school with the Kohrville name. The present day Kohrville Elementary School opened for the 2002-03 school year, north of Kohrville.

The area is now served by:

- Kohrville Elementary School and Blackshear Elementary School
- Ulrich Intermediate School (Rezoned from Hildebrandt Intermediate School in fall 2007, rezoned from Krimmel Intermediate in 2010)
- Klein Cain High School
