= Mike Green (running back) =

American football player (born 1976)

No. 20
- Position: Running back

Personal information
- Born: September 2, 1976 (age 50); Houston, Texas, U.S.

Career information
- High school: Klein (Klein, Texas)
- College: Houston
- NFL draft: 2000: 7th round, 213th overall pick

Career history
- Tennessee Titans (2000–2002); → Barcelona Dragons (2001); Cincinnati Bengals (2003)*; Indianapolis Colts (2003)*; Corpus Christi Hammerheads (NIFL) (2005)
- * Offseason or practice squad member only

Career NFL statistics
- Rushing att-yards: 36-142
- Receptions-yards: 19-121
- Touchdowns: 3
- Stats at Pro Football Reference

Mike Lewayne Green (born September 2, 1976) is an American former professional football player who was a running back in the National Football League (NFL). He played college football for the Houston Cougars and was a seventh round selection (213th overall pick) in the 2000 NFL draft by the Tennessee Titans. He played three seasons for the Titans.
