= Klein Collins High School =

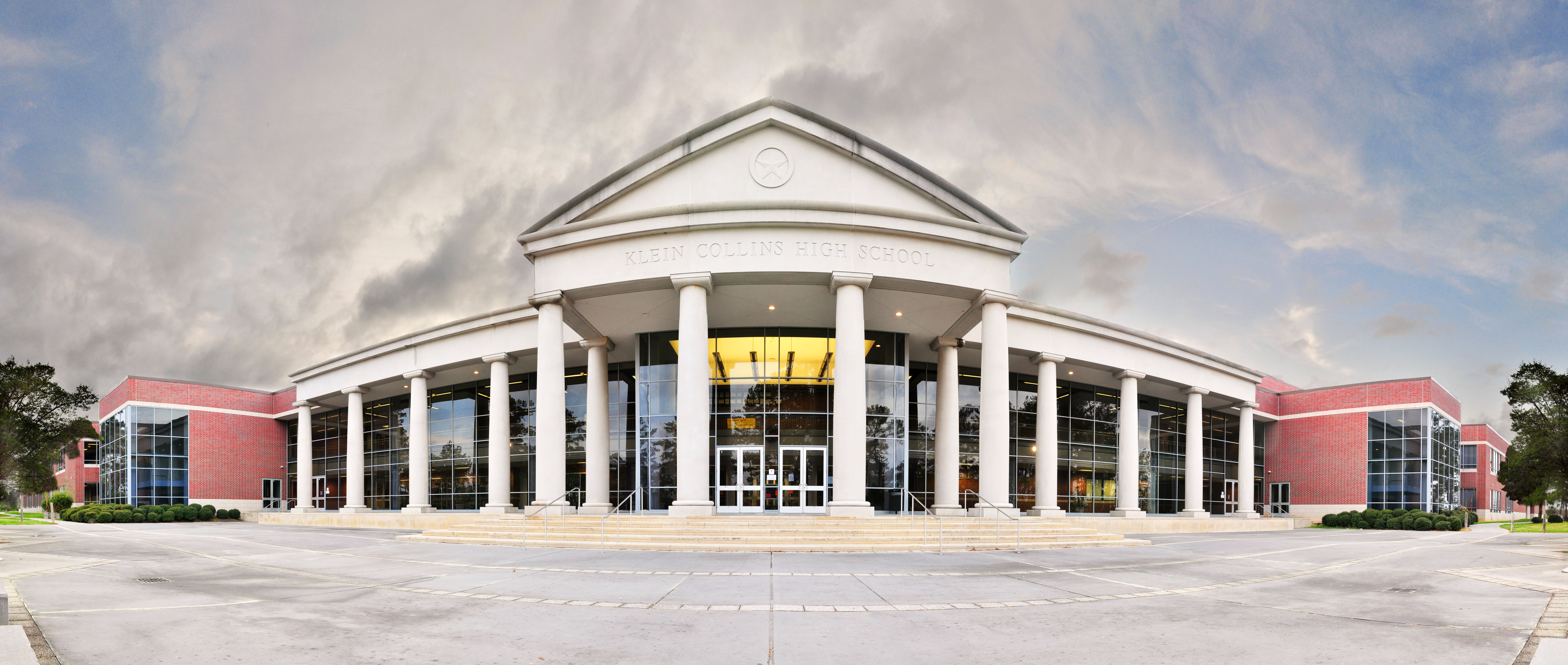

Location
- 20811 Ella Boulevard; Klein, Texas 77388; United States; 30°03′40″N 95°28′42″W

Information
- Type: Public high school
- Motto: "Excellence Without Compromise"
- Established: August 9, 2001
- Principal: Kristen Brady
- Teaching staff: 217.44 FTEs
- Grades: 9-12
- Enrollment: 3,294 (2023-2024)
- Student to teacher ratio: 15.15
- Colors: Navy blue and Vegas gold with cardinal red as an accent
- Athletics conference: UIL Class 6A
- Team name: Tigers
- Newspaper: Legacy Press
- Yearbook: Legacy
- Information: 832-484-5500
- Website: School website

Klein Collins High School is a public high school located at 20811 Ella Boulevard in unincorporated Harris County, Texas, United States. The school, with a Klein, Texas postal address, serves students in grades 9 through 12, as part of the Klein Independent School District. The 555,000-square-foot (51,600 m^{2}) school sits on a 117.5-acre (0.476 km^{2}) site.

The school serves several sections of unincorporated Harris County, including sections of Forest Ridge.

By board policy of the district, all senior high schools must have "Klein" as the first word of their names, in honor of settler Adam Klein. Klein Collins also honors Dr. Don Collins, superintendent of the Klein School District for 29 years.

The school's official student newspaper is the Legacy Press.

== History ==
Klein Collins opened on August 9, 2001 with Ms. Mindy Spurlock as the opening principal. RWS Architects designed the now 602,000-square-foot (55,900 m^{2}) campus and Marshall Construction Company, who received the contract to build Klein Collins on May 10, 1999, built the campus at an approximate cost of $52,000,000 exclusive of furniture and equipment. The campus, built in two separate phases, opened on August 9, 2001 with 1,092 students and a maximum capacity for 3,100 students.

In 2017 portions of the Klein Collins zone west of Kuykendahl Road were planned to be rezoned to Klein High School.

== Demographics ==
As of the 2021-22 school year, the school had an enrollment of 3,333 students. 21.8% of students were African American,29.7% were Hispanic, 12% were White, 0.4% were American Indian, 7.1% were Asian, 0.1% were Pacific Islander, and 4% were Two or More Races. 43.1% of students were Economically Disadvantaged, 11.2% received Special Education, and 8.5% were English Learners.

== Academics ==
For the 2021-22 school year, the school received a B grade from the Texas Education Agency, with an overall score of 83 out of 100. The school received a B grade in two performance domains, Student Achievement (score of 86) and School Progress (score of 82), and a C grade in Closing the Gaps (score of 77). The school did not receive any of the seven possible distinction designations.

== Feeder pattern ==
The following elementary schools feed into Klein Collins:

- Benfer
- Haude
- Kreinhop
- Lemm
- Kuehnle (partial)
- Roth
- Zwink

The following intermediate schools feed into Klein Collins:

- Schindewolf
- Strack (partial)
- Hildebrandt (partial)

== Notable alumni ==
- Jaydon Nget, actor; known for his role as Two-Bit in the North American Broadway Tour of The Outsiders Musical
- Bassel Bawji, Lebanese-American basketball player
- Austin Dean, Major League Baseball outfielder for the San Francisco Giants
- Cameron Goode, linebacker for the Miami Dolphins
- Demetri Goodson, former cornerback and currently college scout for the Green Bay Packers
- Mike Goodson, running back for the New York Jets
- Allison Luff, Broadway actress and singer, known for roles in Waitress and Wicked
- Nick Mikolajchak, pitcher for the Cleveland Guardians organization
- Tyler Naquin, outfielder for the Cincinnati Reds
- Isaiah Spiller, running back for Texas A&M
- Chelsea Stein, wheelchair racer
- Gage Harper, professional mixed martial artist
