= Louetta, Texas =

Unincorporated community in Texas, US

Coordinates: 30°00′24″N 95°33′40″W

Louetta is an unincorporated community in Harris County, Texas, United States, that was formerly a distinct community.

The town was dissolved in 1946.

== Education ==
Klein Independent School District operates schools in the area.
