= Jaydon Blue =

American football player (born 2004)

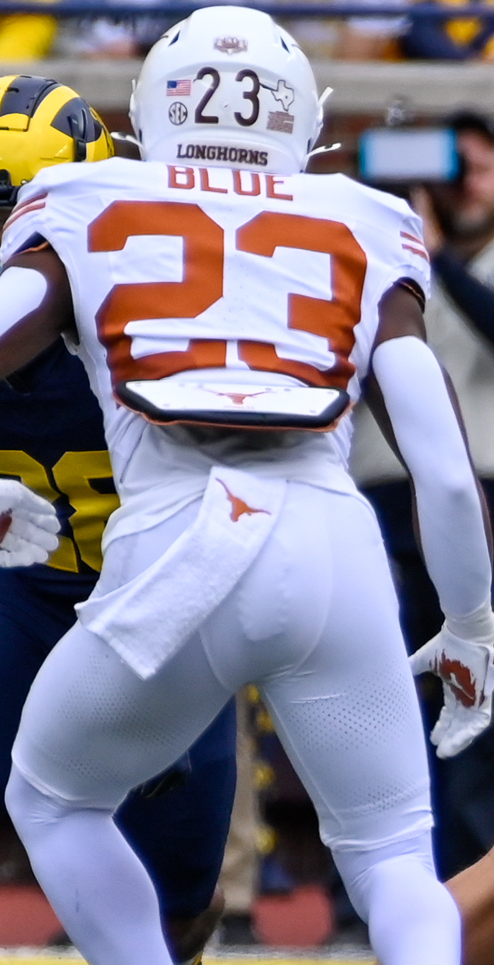
- Blue with the Texas Longhorns in 2024

No. 30 – Philadelphia Eagles
- Position: Running back
- Roster status: Active

Personal information
- Born: January 8, 2004 (age 22)
- Listed height: 5 ft 9 in (1.75 m)
- Listed weight: 198 lb (90 kg)

Career information
- High school: Klein Cain (Harris County, Texas)
- College: Texas (2022–2024)
- NFL draft: 2025: 5th round, 149th overall pick

Career history
- Dallas Cowboys (2025); Philadelphia Eagles (2026–present)

Career NFL statistics as of Week 9, 2026
- Rushing yards: 129
- Rushing average: 3.4
- Rushing touchdowns: 1
- Receptions: 2
- Receiving yards: 14
- Return yards: 340
- Stats at Pro Football Reference

Jaydon Blue (born January 8, 2004) is an American professional football running back for the Philadelphia Eagles of the National Football League (NFL). He played college football for the Texas Longhorns and was selected by the Cowboys in the fifth round of the 2025 NFL draft.

== Early life ==
Blue attended Klein Cain High School. As a sophomore, Blue rushed for 1,612 yards and 16 touchdowns on 205 carries. As a junior, Blue rushed for 2,155 yards and 30 touchdowns. He opted out of the senior season to prepare for college football. Coming out of high school, Blue was rated as a four-star recruit, the 48th overall recruit, and the 3rd overall running back in the class of 2022. Blue committed to play college football for the Texas Longhorns over offers from schools such as Alabama, LSU, Georgia, and Oklahoma.

== College career ==
As a freshman in 2022, Blue rushed 15 times for 33 yards.

In the 2023 regular-season finale, he rushed ten times for a career-high 121 yards and a touchdown in a blowout win over Texas Tech. In the 2024 Sugar Bowl, Blue rushed nine times for 59 yards, tallying four receptions for 45 yards and a touchdown, while also returning three kickoffs for 80 yards versus Washington. He finished the 2023 season with 398 rushing yards and three touchdowns, while also hauling in 14 receptions for 135 yards.

On January 12, 2025, Blue announced his intentions to enter the draft.

== Professional career ==
Pre-draft measurables
Height	Weight	Arm length	Hand span	Wingspan	40-yard dash	10-yard split	20-yard split	Vertical jump	Broad jump
5 ft 9 in (1.75 m)	196 lb (89 kg)	29 7/8 in (0.76 m)	8 1/4 in (0.21 m)	6 ft 3 1/2 in (1.92 m)	4.38 s	1.50 s	2.59 s	29.5 in (0.75 m)	10 ft 3 in (3.12 m)
All values from NFL Combine/Pro Day

=== Dallas Cowboys ===
Blue was selected by the Dallas Cowboys in the 5th round (149th overall) of the 2025 NFL draft. He signed his four-year rookie contract worth $4.63 million. In Week 5 against the New York Jets, he made his NFL debut and was given a chance to be the team's backup behind Javonte Williams after Miles Sanders was lost for the season. He responded with 4 carries for seven rushing yards (1.8-yard avg.) and one kick return for 32 yards. In Week 7 against the Washington Commanders, he had 7 carries for 29 yards (4.1-yard avg.). After Week 8, he was declared inactive in 8 straight games and Malik Davis would end up taking over the backup running back job. In the season finale against the New York Giants, Blue was named the starter after Williams and Davis were placed on injured reserve, scoring his first NFL touchdown, along with 64 rushing yards.

In 2026, Blue was passed on the depth chart by Davis and Israel Abanikanda during the preseason. On August 30, 2026, he was waived by Dallas as a part of final roster cuts.

=== Philadelphia Eagles ===
On August 31, 2026, Blue was signed to the Philadelphia Eagles' practice squad. On October 17, he was promoted to the active roster. On October 20, Blue was waived and re-signed to the practice squad. On October 28, Blue was promoted to the active roster again after running back Dameon Pierce was placed on injured reserve. On November 10, he was waived. On November 16, Blue was re-signed to the practice squad. The next day, he was signed to the active roster.

== Career statistics ==
=== NFL ===
Year	Team	Games		Rushing					Receiving					Kick returns					Fumbles	
Year	Team	GP	GS	Att	Yds	Avg	Lng	TD	Rec	Yds	Avg	Lng	TD	Ret	Yds	Avg	Lng	TD	Fum	Lost
2025	DAL	5	0	38	129	3.4	27	1	1	5	5.0	5	0	3	72	24.0	32	0	1	0
Career		5	0	38	129	3.4	27	1	1	5	5.0	5	0	3	72	24.0	32	0	1	0

=== College ===
Year	Team	Games		Rushing			Receiving			
Year	Team	GP	Att	Yards	Avg	TD	Rec	Yards	Avg	TD
2022	Texas	9	15	33	2.2	0	0	0	0.0	0
2023	Texas	14	65	398	6.1	3	14	135	9.6	1
2024	Texas	15	134	730	5.4	8	42	368	8.8	6
Career		38	214	1,161	5.4	11	56	503	9.0	7
