= Ashton Youboty =

Liberian gridiron football player and coach (born 1984)

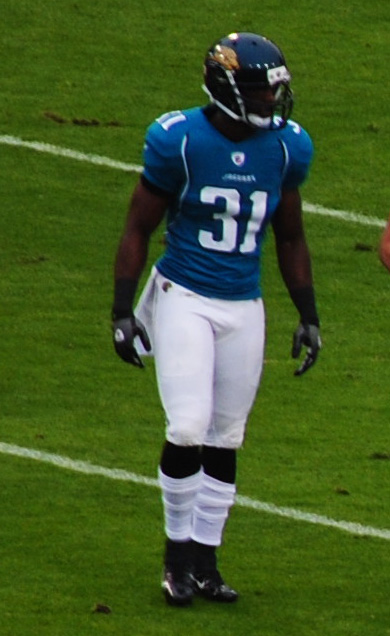
- Youboty with the Jacksonville Jaguars in 2011

No. 26, 31
- Position: Cornerback

Personal information
- Born: 7 July 1984 (age 42); Monrovia, Liberia
- Listed height: 5 ft 11 in (1.80 m)
- Listed weight: 189 lb (86 kg)

Career information
- High school: Klein (Klein, Texas, U.S.)
- College: Ohio State
- NFL draft: 2006: 3rd round, 70th overall pick

Career history

Playing
- Buffalo Bills (2006–2010); Tampa Bay Buccaneers (2011)*; Jacksonville Jaguars (2011)
- * Offseason or practice squad member only

Coaching
- Wisconsin (2017–2018) Quality control coach; Wisconsin (2019) Senior defensive analyst; Youngstown State (2020–2021) Cornerbacks coach; Purdue (2022) Cornerbacks coach

Awards and highlights
- First-team All-Big Ten (2005)

Career NFL statistics
- Total tackles: 85
- Sacks: 2
- Forced fumbles: 1
- Fumble recoveries: 1
- Interceptions: 2
- Defensive touchdowns: 1
- Stats at Pro Football Reference

Ashton Youboty (born 7 July 1984) is a Liberian coach of American football and former cornerback. He played college football for the Ohio State Buckeyes for coach Jim Tressel from 2003 to 2006 and played in the National Football League (NFL) for six seasons from 2006 to 2011. He forwent his senior season and was selected by the Buffalo Bills in the third round (70 overall) of the 2006 NFL draft. After five seasons with the Bills (2006–2010), he played for the Jacksonville Jaguars in 2011.

== Early life ==
Youboty was born in Monrovia, Liberia, the oldest of four children for Jeannet Waylee. After a civil war broke out in his native country, his family settled in Philadelphia, Pennsylvania, where he attended Girard College, a college-prep boarding school for single-parent kids and low-income families. Girard did not have a football team due to lack of insurance, so Youboty eventually joined the Wynnefield Hawks Football Club under the guidance of coach Wayne King.

Youboty and his family eventually relocated to Houston, Texas. He attended Klein High School, where he returned to graduate with the class of 2003 after participating as an early winter enrollee at the Ohio State University. As a freshman, he played football, basketball, and ran track. By the end of his freshman football season, he was moved up to the varsity football team, where he played cornerback, safety, wide receiver, and returned kicks. As a three-year starter, he competed against many of Houston's most talented football players including Woodlands High School's Danny Amendola. His first college-football scholarship offer came from Nick Saban during the latter's tenure at Louisiana State University but Youboty eventually signed to play for Jim Tressel at the Ohio State University.

== College career ==
He passed up his senior year of eligibility at Ohio State University to enter the 2006 NFL draft.

== Professional career ==
Pre-draft measurables
Height	Weight	Arm length	Hand span	40-yard dash	20-yard shuttle	Three-cone drill	Vertical jump	Broad jump	Bench press
5 ft 11 3/4 in (1.82 m)	189 lb (86 kg)	30 7/8 in (0.78 m)	8 3/4 in (0.22 m)	4.44 s	4.18 s	6.96 s	36.0 in (0.91 m)	10 ft 0 in (3.05 m)	11 reps
All values from NFL Combine/Pro Day

=== Buffalo Bills ===
Youboty was drafted in the third round (70th overall) of the 2006 NFL draft by the Buffalo Bills, joining Donte Whitner as the second Ohio State Buckeyes football player selected by the Bills in the draft. He played with the Bills for the first five seasons of his career from 2006 to 2010. Youboty's best season in the NFL was 2007 when he appeared in eleven games for the Bills and was credited with 23 tackles (22 solo), a sack and an interception.

=== Tampa Bay Buccaneers ===
Youboty signed with the Tampa Bay Buccaneers on 15 August 2011. He was released on 29 August 2011.

=== Jacksonville Jaguars ===
The Jacksonville Jaguars signed Youboty on 15 November 2011. In his first game, he recovered a fumble and returned it for a touchdown against the Houston Texans on 27 November 2011. Youboty was placed on Injured Reserve on 26 December 2011 after injuring his left hamstring. Youboty was released on 25 August 2012.

== Coaching career ==
Following the conclusion of his athletic career, Youboty worked as a Quality control coach for the Wisconsin Badgers football program. After two seasons, he was elevated to senior defensive analyst.

For the 2020 and 2021 seasons, Youboty served as the cornerbacks coach for the Youngstown State Penguins football team.

In February 2022, Youboty joined Jeff Brohm's staff at Purdue as the cornerbacks coach.

== Personal life ==
The oldest of four children, he has one sister and two brothers. His mother died in August 2006.
