= Matthew Golden =

American football player (born 2003)

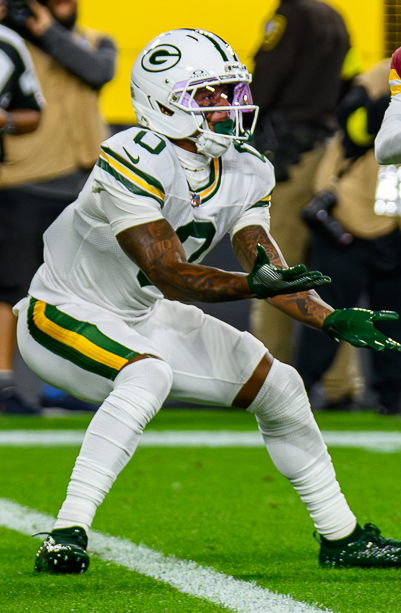
- Golden in 2025

No. 0 – Green Bay Packers
- Position: Wide receiver
- Roster status: Active

Personal information
- Born: August 1, 2003 (age 23); Houston, Texas, U.S.
- Listed height: 5 ft 11 in (1.80 m)
- Listed weight: 191 lb (87 kg)

Career information
- High school: Klein Cain (Harris County, Texas)
- College: Houston (2022–2023); Texas (2024)
- NFL draft: 2025: 1st round, 23rd overall pick

Career history
- Green Bay Packers (2025–present)

Awards and highlights
- Second-team All-Big 12 (2023)

Career NFL statistics as of Week 10, 2026
- Receptions: 87
- Receiving yards: 1,214
- Receiving touchdowns: 5
- Rushing yards: 55
- Return yards: 68
- Stats at Pro Football Reference

Matthew Golden (born August 1, 2003) is an American professional football wide receiver for the Green Bay Packers of the National Football League (NFL). He played college football for the Houston Cougars and Texas Longhorns and was selected by the Packers in the first round of the 2025 NFL draft.

== Early life ==
Golden was born in Houston, Texas and attended Klein Cain High School, where he caught 167 receptions for 3,242 yards and 32 touchdowns, while also rushing for 112 yards and four touchdowns. A four star prospect, he initially committed to play college football at Texas Christian University, but later flipped his commitment to the University of Houston.

== College career ==
=== Houston ===
Ahead of his freshman season in 2022, Golden earned a starting spot. In week 12 of the 2022 season, he brought in eight passes for 127 yards and two touchdowns in a win over East Carolina. Golden finished the season with 38 receptions for 584 yards and seven touchdowns. He was listed on the Walter Camp Award watchlist for the 2023 season. In week 3 of the 2023 season, Golden hauled in four passes for 56 yards, while also returning three kicks for 132 yards and a touchdown, in a loss versus TCU, earning Big 12 Conference special teams player of the week honors. In week 7, he returned a kick 99 yards for a touchdown in a win over West Virginia.

On December 7, 2023, Golden announced that he would be entering the transfer portal.

=== Texas ===
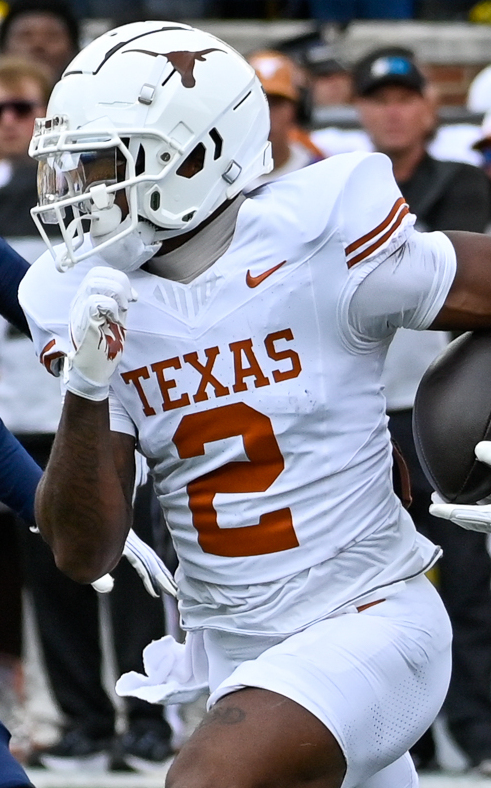
Golden with the Texas Longhorns in 2024

On December 16, 2023, Golden announced that he would be transferring to Texas. In the 2024 regular season, he led the team with 49 receptions for 787 yards and eight touchdowns. Texas lost to Georgia in the Southeastern Conference (SEC) championship game and advanced to the College football Playoffs, beating Clemson and Arizona State. On January 13, 2025, Golden declared for the 2025 NFL draft.

== Professional career ==
Pre-draft measurables
Height	Weight	Arm length	Hand span	Wingspan	40-yard dash	10-yard split	20-yard split
5 ft 11 in (1.80 m)	191 lb (87 kg)	30 5/8 in (0.78 m)	9 1/2 in (0.24 m)	6 ft 4 3/8 in (1.94 m)	4.29 s	1.49 s	2.49 s
All values from NFL Combine

=== 2025 season ===
Golden was selected in the first round with the 23rd overall in the 2025 NFL draft by the Green Bay Packers. He was the first wide receiver selected in the first round by the Packers since Javon Walker in 2002. Golden signed his four-year rookie contract on May 19, 2025 worth $17.58 million fully guaranteed. Golden was named the starting outside receiver over veterans Dontayvion Wicks and Malik Heath.

Golden made his NFL debut in Week 1 against the Detroit Lions, catching 2 passes for 16 yards in the 27–13 win. In the Week 3 loss to the Cleveland Browns, Golden had his first 50+ yard game, catching 4 passes for 52 yards and rushing 9 yards. He would finish his rookie season with 29 receptions for 361 yards, as well as carrying the ball ten times for 49 yards. In a Wild Card playoff game against the Chicago Bears, Golden had 4 receptions for 84 yards, including a 23-yard touchdown, the first of his NFL career, in a 31–27 loss.

=== 2026 season ===
Entering the 2026 season, Golden was named the third wide receiver on the depth chart behind Christian Watson and Jayden Reed. Then, after the 20–17 overtime win against the New York Jets in week two, after Reed was down during the game and eventually out for the rest of the season, Golden became the second wide receiver in the depth chart following the injury. Golden was devastated after Reed was ruled out for the season. Right away, Golden would make an impact for the Packers that season.

Golden had his first career 100-yard receiving game against the Atlanta Falcons on five receptions, including catching his first regular-season touchdown in the 35–14 loss. He would then have back-to-back 100-yard receiving games for the first time in his career, catching six passes for 123 yards against the Chicago Bears in the 31–7 win, and catching six passes for 104 yards and a touchdown in the 23–13 win against the Dallas Cowboys. In the 45–27 win against the New England Patriots, he caught ten receptions on ten targets for 164 receiving yards and a touchdown, while Watson had seven receptions for 171 receiving yards and a touchdown. They both became the first wide-receiver duo in Packers history to have 150+ receiving yards and 1+ touchdown since Don Hutson and Andy Uram in 1942. However, during that game, when Watson caught a 39-yard touchdown in the third quarter, he and Watson did a "double-backflip celebration", in which both him and his teammate did a backflip together. This resulted in head coach Matt LaFleur issuing a warning to them to never do that again, citing injury concerns.

== Career statistics ==
=== NFL ===
==== Regular season ====
NFL regular season statistics
Year	Team	Games		Receiving					Rushing					Fumbles	
Year	Team	GP	GS	Rec	Yds	Avg	Lng	TD	Att	Yds	Avg	Lng	TD	Fum	Lost
2025	GB	14	5	29	361	12.4	46	0	10	49	4.9	9	0	0	0
2026	GB	8	7	43	619	14.4	50	4	1	6	6	6	0	0	0
Career		22	12	72	980	13.6	50	4	11	55	5	9	0	0	0
Source: pro-football-reference.com

==== Postseason ====
NFL postseason statistics
Year	Team	Games		Receiving					Rushing					Fumbles	
Year	Team	GP	GS	Rec	Yds	Avg	Lng	TD	Att	Yds	Avg	Lng	TD	Fum	Lost
2025	GB	1	0	4	84	21.0	36	1	0	0	0.0	0	0	0	0
Career		1	0	4	84	21.0	36	1	0	0	0.0	0	0	0	0
Source: pro-football-reference.com

=== College ===
College statistics
Year	Team	Games		Receiving				Kick returns			
Year	Team	GP	GS	Rec	Yds	Avg	TD	Att	Yds	Avg	TD
2022	Houston	11	8	38	584	15.4	7	5	116	23.2	0
2023	Houston	9	9	38	404	10.6	6	9	321	35.7	2
2024	Texas	16	16	58	987	17.0	9	14	285	20.4	0
Career		36	33	134	1,975	14.7	22	28	722	25.8	2
Source: sports-reference.com
