= Randy Bullock =

American football player (born 1989)

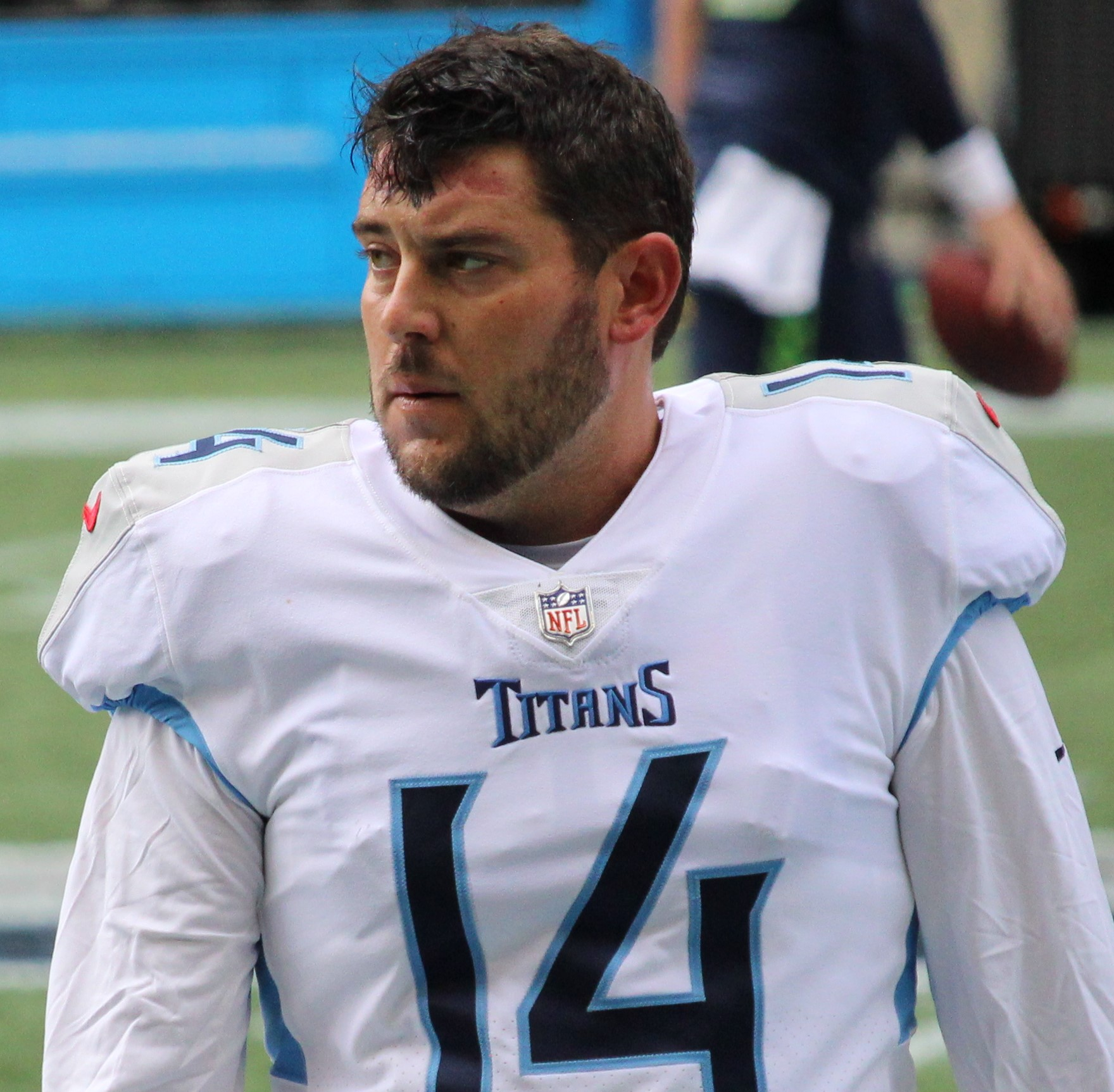
- Bullock with the Tennessee Titans in 2021

No. 4, 8, 5, 2, 14, 46
- Position: Placekicker

Personal information
- Born: December 16, 1989 (age 36); Lafayette, Louisiana, U.S.
- Listed height: 5 ft 9 in (1.75 m)
- Listed weight: 210 lb (95 kg)

Career information
- High school: Klein (Klein, Texas)
- College: Texas A&M (2008–2011)
- NFL draft: 2012: 5th round, 161st overall pick

Career history
- Houston Texans (2012–2015); New York Jets (2015); New York Giants (2016); Pittsburgh Steelers (2016); Cincinnati Bengals (2016–2020); Detroit Lions (2021)*; Tennessee Titans (2021–2022); New York Giants (2023)
- * Offseason or practice squad member only

Awards and highlights
- Lou Groza Award (2011); Consensus All-American (2011); First-team All-Big 12 (2011)

Career NFL statistics
- Field goals made: 216
- Field goal attempts: 259
- Field goal %: 83.4
- Longest field goal: 57
- Touchbacks: 371
- Stats at Pro Football Reference

Randolph Richard Bullock (born December 16, 1989) is an American former professional football player who was a placekicker in the National Football League (NFL). He played college football for the Texas A&M Aggies, and was recognized as the nation's best college football kicker and a consensus All-American. He was selected by the Houston Texans in the fifth round of the 2012 NFL draft, after winning college football's Lou Groza Award.

== Early life ==
Bullock was born in Lafayette, Louisiana. He grew up in Klein, Texas, which is in the Houston area. He attended Klein High School, where he played football. Bullock was the fourth-ranked kicker in the nation coming out of high school with at least six formal collegiate scholarship offers.

Bullock attended Texas A&M University, where he played for the Texas A&M Aggies football team from 2008 to 2011. After completing 29 of his 33 field goal attempts during his 2011 senior season, he received the Lou Groza Award, given annually to the best college football placekicker. He was also recognized as a consensus first-team All-American in 2011.

Bullock is the all-time scoring leader at Texas A&M University with 365 points in 46 collegiate games. His 63 field goals is also a Texas A&M record during his tenure in College Station. He still holds the records for consecutive extra points and most extra points in Texas A&M history.

Bullock returned to Texas A&M to finish his petroleum engineering degree at the conclusion of his rookie season on injured reserve.

== Professional career ==
Pre-draft measurables
Height	Weight	Arm length	Hand span	Wingspan
5 ft 9 1/4 in (1.76 m)	205 lb (93 kg)	29 1/4 in (0.74 m)	8 3/8 in (0.21 m)	5 ft 10 3/8 in (1.79 m)
All values from NFL Combine

=== Houston Texans ===
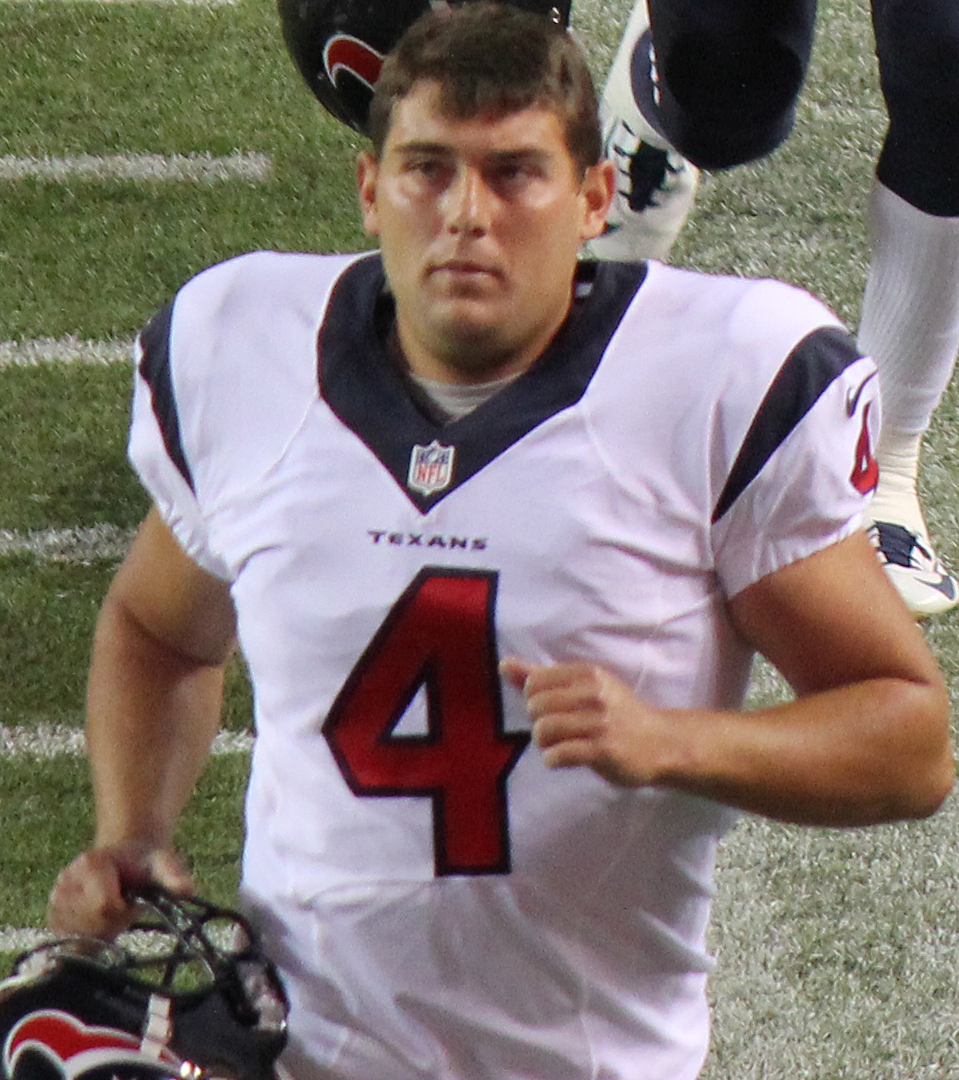
Bullock with the Texans in 2014

The Houston Texans selected Bullock in the fifth round of the 2012 NFL draft, with the 161st overall pick, becoming the first kicker ever drafted by the team. His draft profiles agreed that he has tremendous leg strength for field goals and kickoffs, along with his accuracy on long and short kicks. NFL draft analysts noted that Bullock takes a consistent, controlled approach to each kick, getting enough rise to avoid blocks.

Bullock was competing with veteran Shayne Graham for the placekicker position. He had made 3 of 4 field goal attempts in the preseason, with the majority of his attempts coming from longer than 50 yards. Bullock's rookie season abruptly ended on August 26, 2012, when he was placed on injured reserve with a groin tear.

Bullock fully recovered from his injury, without losing leg strength, and won the kicking job the following season. During the 2013 preseason, Bullock hit 6 of 7 field goal attempts, including one from 55 yards.

In the game against the San Diego Chargers during Week 1 of the 2013 regular season, Bullock hit the game-winning field goal from 41 yards to cap the biggest comeback in Texans history. However, in week 2 against the Tennessee Titans, he missed three long field goals (from 50, 50, and 46 yards). In Week 9 against the Indianapolis Colts, he missed three field goals, including a 55-yard attempt in the final seconds of the game; the Texans lost by a score of 27–24.

After early struggles in only two of his 2013 games, Bullock showed his mental toughness by finishing the 2013 season strong and making 12 consecutive field goals. He converted 26 of 35 field goal attempts and all 26 extra point attempts in total. He continued his success streak into the 2014 season, breaking the record for the most consecutive field goals in Texans' franchise history (16). The streak came to an end due to a blocked field goal on a missed blocking assignment against the Oakland Raiders. This streak did not include Bullock's perfect preseason with the Texans in 2014 finishing 100% (4/4) with field goals, including a long kick of 52 yards, and 100% (4/4) with extra points. Bullock was reliable with his misses typically coming on field goal attempts beyond 50 yards in 2013.

During the 2014 season, he finished the season as the 6th-ranked NFL kicker based on his performance of making 30 of 35 field goal attempts in the regular season, with a long of 55 yards. He made 4 of 5 attempts (80%) beyond 50 yards that season. He also converted 100% of his 40 extra point attempts. Bullock added 40 touchbacks in the 2014 regular season, the 12th most in the NFL that year.

On December 21, 2014, against the Baltimore Ravens, Bullock set a Texans' franchise record for most field goals in a game, making all six field goal attempts as well as setting another franchise record for most points in a single game (19), en route to leading the Texans to a 25–13 win. Bullock also was awarded the AFC Special Teams Player of the Week. In the 2014 season, he converted 30 of 35 field goal attempts and all 40 extra point attempts.

In 2015, when a rule change lengthened the distance from which an extra point is attempted, Bullock was tied for first among all NFL placekickers in preseason field goal success percentage with a perfect 5 field goals in 5 attempts, and a 100% success rate of 7/7 on the extra point attempts. Bullock was the first kicker to miss an extra point, but remained a combined (preseason and regular season) 10/11 (91%) on field goals and 10/12 (83.3%) on PATs in 2015.

On September 29, 2015, the Texans released Bullock and signed Nick Novak to replace him, despite being ranked among the Top (10) NFL kickers in terms of field goal percentage making 4 of 5 attempts. The lone 2015 field goal miss was a 43-yard attempt that hit the right upright in the Texans' Week 3 win over Tampa Bay Buccaneers. Bullock had 10 touchbacks on 13 kickoff attempts (77%) with the Houston Texans in 2015, keeping him in the Top 7 of NFL kickers by touchback percentage after Week 3.

Nearly 20% of his field goal attempts as a member of the Texans were 50+ yards, well above the NFL average, as the Texans struggled on offense from 2013 to 2015, often failing to reach the red zone.

=== New York Jets ===
On November 10, 2015, Bullock was signed as a free agent by the New York Jets after veteran Nick Folk suffered a quadriceps injury the previous game and was placed on injured reserve. On December 6, 2015, Bullock scored 11 points against the New York Giants, including the game-winning attempt in overtime. On December 19, 2015, Bullock kicked two field goals, including the game-winner against the Dallas Cowboys. Bullock missed an extra point and a field goal against Dallas. On December 27, 2015, Bullock scored eight points against the New England Patriots, including a 49-yard attempt to tie the game in the final minutes of the fourth quarter. In the 2015 season, he converted 19 of 23 field goal attempts and 22 of 25 extra point attempts in his time with two teams.

=== New York Giants (first stint) ===
On August 22, 2016, Bullock was signed by the New York Giants. On September 13, 2016, Bullock was released by the Giants after the season opener against the Dallas Cowboys. Bullock was only needed for one game due to the suspension of Josh Brown.

=== Pittsburgh Steelers ===
On December 3, 2016, Bullock was signed by the Pittsburgh Steelers after Chris Boswell was questionable with an injury. Bullock actually won the Houston Texans' kicking job over Boswell in 2014. On December 4, 2016, Bullock made his Steelers debut during a 24–14 victory over the New York Giants and completed field goals from 34 yards, 38 yards, and 44 yards while also making an extra point and three touchbacks. On December 12, the Steelers released Bullock due to the return of Boswell after being on the active roster for just two games and earning the game ball from Mike Tomlin in one of those.

=== Cincinnati Bengals ===
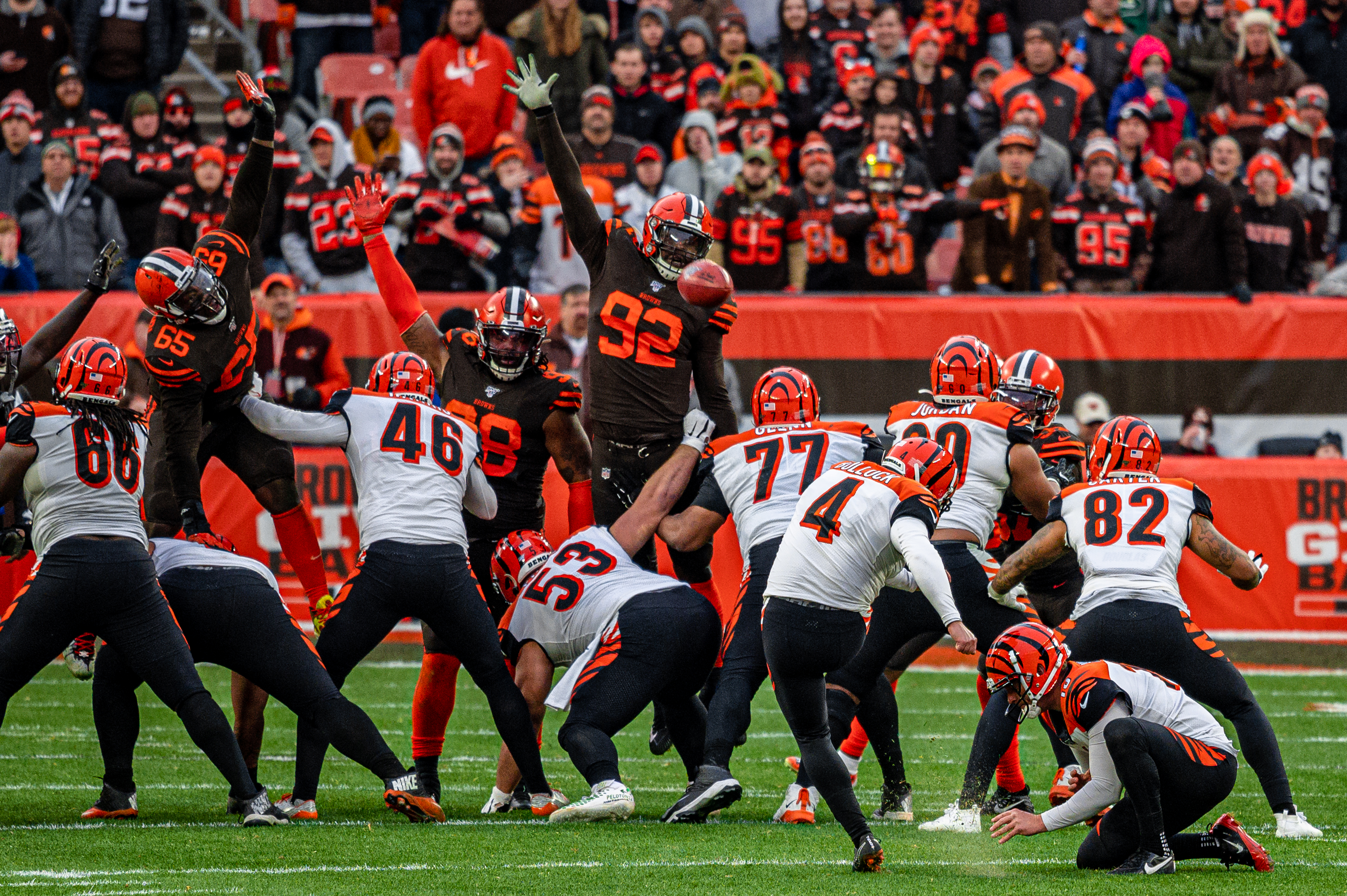
Bullock playing against the Cleveland Browns in 2019.

On December 13, 2016, Bullock was claimed off waivers by the Cincinnati Bengals after the team cut Mike Nugent following his struggles. On December 18, 2016, Bullock was 2-for-2 on field goals, 2-for-2 on extra points, and made a touchdown-saving tackle on return-man Sammie Coates after a few missed Bengal tackles in a loss against the Pittsburgh Steelers. On December 24, 2016, Bullock missed a 43-yard field goal attempt as time expired, which gave his former team the Houston Texans the 12–10 win and a playoff spot. In the 2016 season, he converted eight of nine field goal attempts and nine of ten extra point attempts over his time with three teams.

On January 26, 2017, Bullock signed a two-year contract extension with the Bengals. On September 14, 2017, in Week 2, Bullock converted three field goals and was responsible for all of the offensive scoring against the Texans in a 13–9 loss. In the 2017 season, he converted 18 of 20 field goal attempts and 31 of 33 extra point attempts.

On September 18, 2018, Bullock signed a two-year contract extension with the Bengals through the 2020 season. In the 2018 season, Bullock converted 19 of 23 field goal attempts and 39 of 41 extra point attempts.

On December 22, 2019, Bullock made a career-long field goal of 57 yards against the Miami Dolphins. The conversion was the longest field goal in Bengals franchise history. He finished the 2019 season converting 27 of 31 field goal attempts and 24 of 25 extra point attempts.

In the 2020 season, Bullock converted 21 of 26 field goal attempts and 24 of 25 extra point attempts.

=== Detroit Lions ===
On March 22, 2021, Bullock signed a one-year contract with the Detroit Lions. He was released on August 31, 2021.

=== Tennessee Titans ===
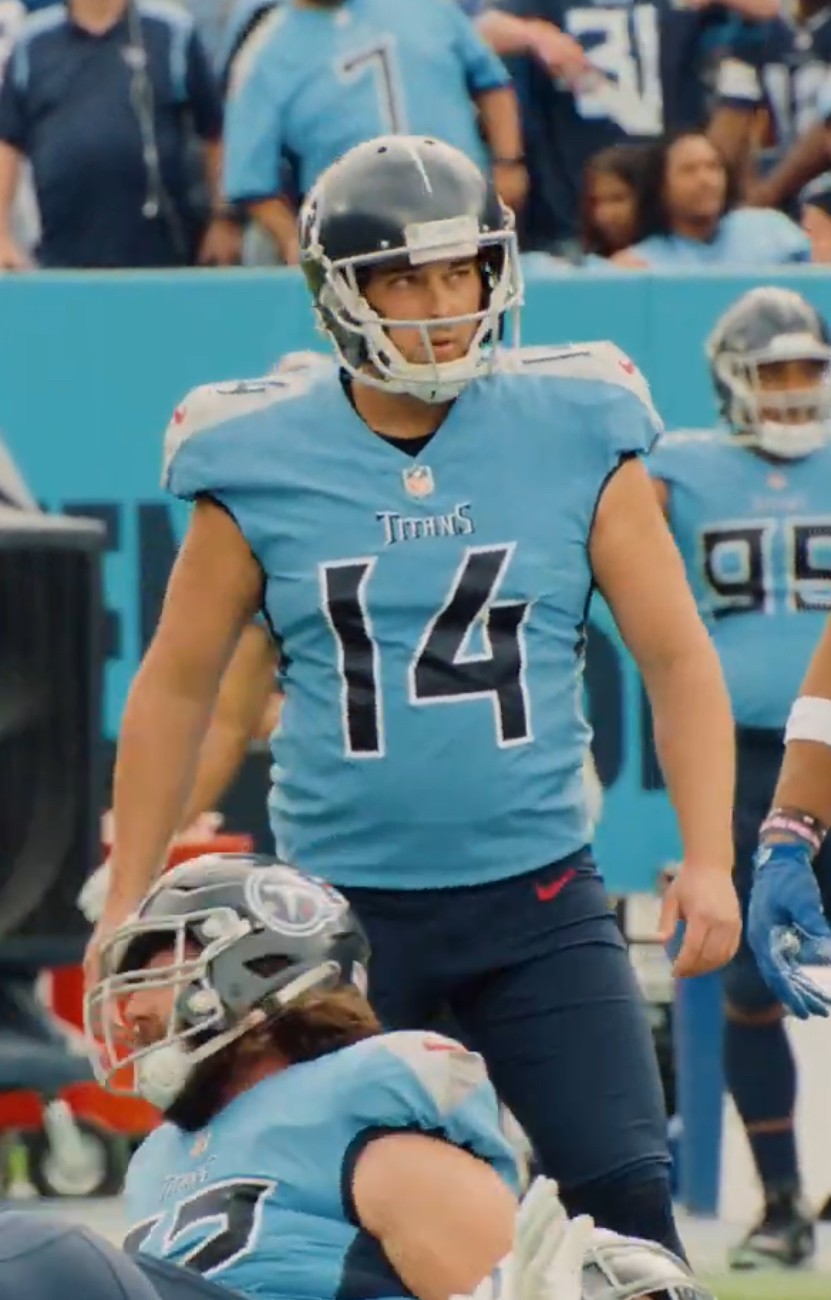
Bullock with the Titans in 2022

On September 11, 2021, Bullock signed with the practice squad of the Tennessee Titans. On September 14, he was promoted to the active roster following the release of Michael Badgley. On September 19, in his first game with the Titans, Bullock made four field goals, including a 36-yard kick in overtime to win the game against the Seattle Seahawks 33–30. During the Week 8 game against the Indianapolis Colts, Bullock received his second career Special Teams Player of the Week award, after making two game-changing field goals. He finished the 2021 season converting 26 of 31 field goal attempts and 42 of 45 extra point attempts.

On March 19, 2022, Bullock re-signed with the Titans. In Week 7, Bullock made four out of four field goals and an extra point for a total of 13 points in a 19–10 win over the Indianapolis Colts, earning AFC Special Teams Player of the Week. He finished the 2022 season converting 17 of 20 field goal attempts and all 28 extra point attempts. The Titans released him on February 22, 2023.

=== New York Giants (second stint) ===
On November 2, 2023, Bullock was signed to the Giants practice squad after starting kicker Graham Gano was placed on injured reserve. He was signed to the active roster on November 24. He suffered a hamstring injury in Week 15 and was placed on injured reserve on December 21. He appeared in six games in the 2023 season. He finished converting all ten extra point attempts and five of six field goal attempts. Bullock became an unrestricted free agent at the end of the league year on March 13, 2024.

==== Retirement ====
Bullock officially retired from the NFL in August 2025.

== Personal life ==
Bullock married his wife Hailey Bullock on March 8, 2020. They have one child, Briar, born in 2022.
