= Klein High School =

Public high school in Klein, Texas, United States

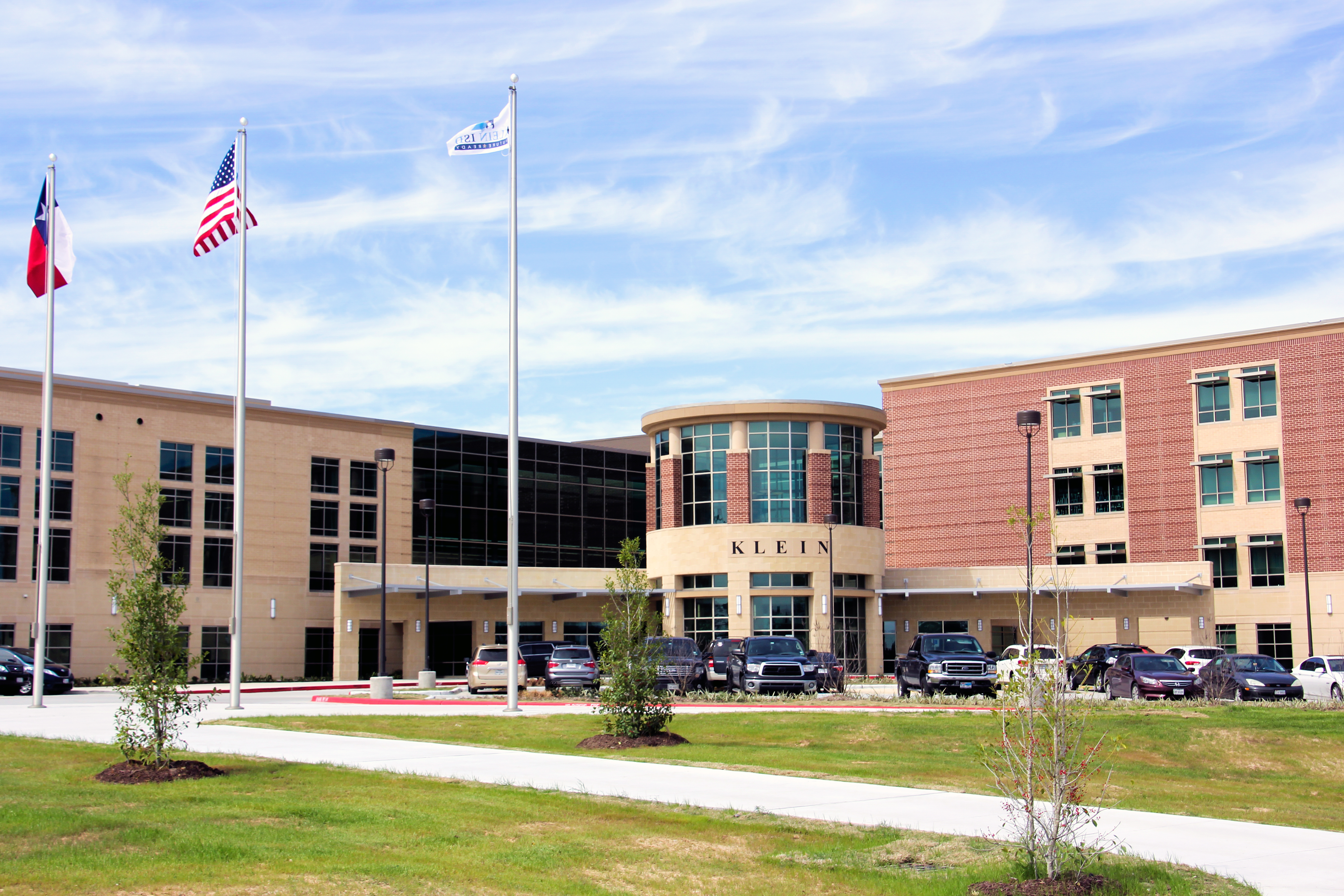

Location
- 16715 Stuebner Airline Rd. Klein, (Harris County), Texas 77379-7376; United States; 30°01′08″N 95°31′27″W

Information
- Type: Public high school
- Motto: Together, We Make the Difference.
- Established: 1938; 88 years ago
- School district: Klein Independent School District
- Principal: Shannon Strole
- Teaching staff: 218.52 FTEs
- Grades: 9–12
- Gender: Coeducational
- Enrollment: 3,396 (2023-2024)
- Student to teacher ratio: 15.54
- Campus: Suburb
- Colors: Blue; Gold
- Athletics conference: UIL Class 6A Region II District 15
- Mascot: Bearkats
- Newspaper: The Bearchat
- Yearbook: Bearkat
- Website: kleinhs.kleinisd.net

Klein High School is a public high school located in Klein, Texas, United States, located approximately 20 miles (32 km) from Downtown Houston. It serves grades 9–12 in the Klein Independent School District. The current principal of Klein High School is Shannon Strole.

== History ==
In July 1928, five common school districts in the area were consolidated into Rural High School District Number One. The new high school was formed from French School, Hildebrandt School, Oak Grove School, and Willow Creek School. Kohrville School, a school for black children, also consolidated into the district.

The new district's high school building was located at what is now 7200 Spring-Cypress Road, between Kuykendahl Road and Stuebner Airline Road. This building is now behind the district's central office building. In 1938, Rural High School District Number One became Klein Independent School District, and its high school became Klein High School. The high school moved to its current location in 1963.

The old main building of Klein High School was demolished in 2010 to make way for construction of a completely new facility that has now replaced all existing buildings. All construction was completed by December 2014. Plans for the new campus are online (see reference).

In 2017, areas of the Klein Collins High School zone west of Kuykendahl Road were rezoned to Klein High, and areas of the Klein Forest High School zone between Cypress Creek and Farm to Market Road 1960 were rezoned to Klein High.

== Profile ==
Klein was the first high school established in the Klein Independent School District. It is accredited by the Texas Education Agency and the Southern Association of Colleges and Schools. 93% of the 2006 graduating class planned on attending college, receiving over $7 million in college scholarships.

In the 2020-21 school year, there were 3,190 students. 17.6% were African American, 11.1% were Asian, 31.3% were Hispanic, 0.4% were American Indian, 0.1% were Pacific Islander, 34.7% were White, and 4.8% were two or more races. 40.1% of students were Economically Disadvantaged, 6.7% were English Language Learners, and 8.9% received Special Education services.

== Academics ==
For the 2021-22 school year, the school received a B grade from the Texas Education Agency, with an overall score of 89 out of 100. The school received a B grade in two domains, School Progress (score of 85) and Closing the Gaps (score of 88), and an A grade in Student Achievement (score of 90). The school received four of the seven possible distinction designations: Academic Achievement in Mathematics, Academic Achievement in Science, Top 25% Comparative Academic Growth, and Top 25% Comparative Closing the Gaps.

== Sports and other activities ==
Klein High School competes in UIL Region II District 15 along with Klein Oak, Klein Collins, Klein Forest, and Klein Cain.

=== State championships ===
- Boys Soccer: 1997, 1999, 2005
- Baseball: 1998
- Tennis: 1982-83, 1989–90
- Chess Team: 2002

=== Cheerleading ===
The Klein High School cheerleaders Nationals Team earned a national championship at the 2006 NCA Senior and Junior High School National Championships in the Medium Varsity division, and also won a specialty award for Best Use of Jumps in the routine. The 2007 NCA National Championship was preceded by a regional title at the Texas Lone Star Classic and a state championship at the Texas State Championships for Division 5A schools. The cheerleading team has earned six national titles at the NCA competition in the last 19 years including Grand Champions in 2000.

=== Music ===
The Klein High School full orchestra was named the Texas Music Educators Association (TMEA) honor orchestra for 2007–08, the fourth time that the full orchestra was honored. It won similar honors in 1998, 2001, and 2003. In 2016–17, the school was chosen as the string honor orchestra.

The Wind Symphony was one of five National Wind Band winner in 2008 in Class AAAAA.

=== Debate ===
In 2010, a Klein junior varsity team finished first at the Harvard National Debate Tournament.

== Notable alumni ==
Name	Class Year	Notability	Reference
Kevin Adams	1980	Theatre designer, 4-time Tony Award winner	
Josh Barfield	2001	Baseball player for San Diego Padres (2006) and Cleveland Indians (2007–2009)	
Joey Banes	1985	Football player for Indianapolis Colts	
Matthew Bomer	1996	Actor, White Collar	
Randy Bullock	2008	Football player for Texas A&M Aggies, Houston Texans, New York Jets, Pittsburgh Steelers, and Cincinnati Bengals	
Lynn Collins	1994	Actress, theatre and movies	
Chris George	1998	Gold medalist with 2000 USA Olympic Baseball Team in Sydney, Australia	
Mike Green	1996	Football player for Tennessee Titans	
Kovid Gupta	2006	Screenwriter and author, Kingdom of The Soap Queen: The Story of Balaji Telefilms	
Lyle Lovett	1975	Musician, 4-time Grammy Award winner	
Farrah Moan	2011	Drag queen, contestant on RuPaul's Drag Race	
David Murphy	2000	Major League Baseball player for Boston Red Sox and Texas Rangers	
Lee Pace	1997	Actor, Pushing Daisies, The Hobbit, Halt and Catch Fire, Guardians of the Galaxy	
Matt Purke	2009	Baseball player for Chicago White Sox (2016)	
Ben Rappaport	2004	Actor, Outsourced	
Allen Rice		Football player for Minnesota Vikings	
Devin Richardson	2018	Football player for Seattle Seahawks, BC Lions	
Eric Rowe	2011	Football player for New England Patriots	
Kendra Scott	1992	Jewelry designer	
Sherry Stringfield	1985	Actress, ER	
Sloan Thomas	2000	Football player, Texas Longhorns, Tennessee Titans, New York Jets, Seattle Seahawks	
Sylvester Turner	1973	Member of Texas House of Representatives, Mayor of Houston, Member of the United States House of Representatives	
Derek Webb	1992	Musician in Caedmon's Call (and solo artist)	
Laura Wilkinson	1996	Diver, 2004 World Cup and 2000 Olympic platform gold medalist	
Ashton Youboty	2003	Football player, 3rd round draft pick by NFL's Buffalo Bills	
