= Klein, Texas =

- Unincorporated community
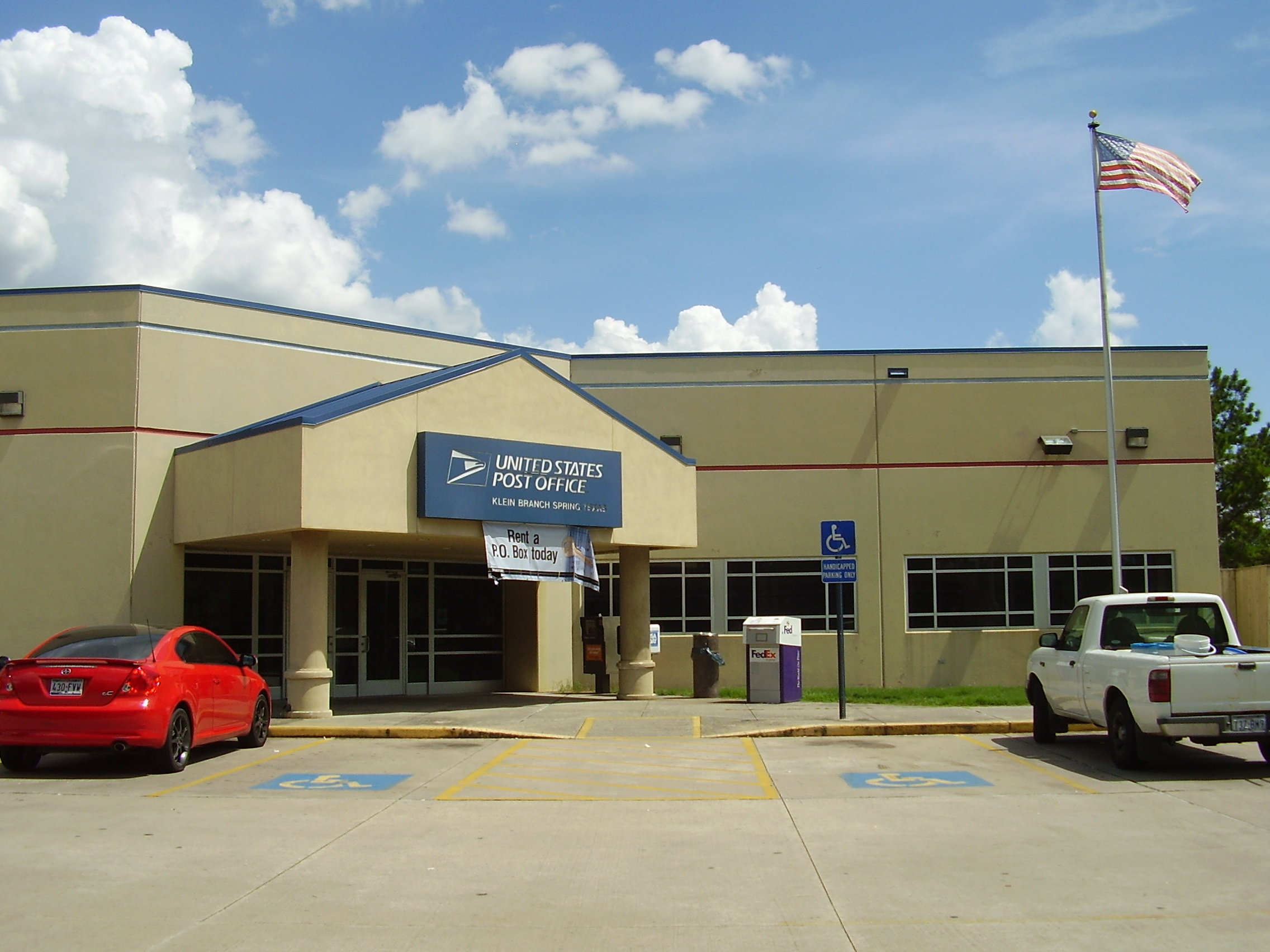
- Klein Post Office

- Location within Texas Location within the United States
- Coordinates: 30°1′16″N 95°31′26″W
- Country: United States
- State: Texas
- County: Harris
- Elevation: 140 ft (43 m)

Population
  - Total: 200,805
- Time zone: UTC-6 (Central (CST))
  - Summer (DST): UTC-5 (CDT)
- Postal codes: 77379, 77388, 77066, 77069, 77086, 77391, 77389
- Area codes: 713, 281, 832, 346, 621

Klein is an unincorporated community in Harris County, Texas, United States, roughly bordering SH 99 to the north, SH 249 to the west, I-45 to the east, and the city of Houston to the south. It includes the entire area of Klein ISD. Residents of the zip codes 77066, 77069, 77086, 77379, 77388, 77389, and 77391 can use Klein as their postal city. Klein is one of the largest and most diverse unincorporated areas of Houston.

It is named after Adam Klein, a German immigrant whose best-known great-great-grandson is singer Lyle Lovett. Other famous sons and daughters of the Klein community include actor Jim Parsons, actor Lee Pace, actor Matthew Bomer, actress Lynn Collins, actress Sherry Stringfield, singer/songwriter Derek Webb, actor Ben Rappaport, director of photography David Klein, Major League Baseball players David Murphy and Josh Barfield, NFL players Randy Bullock, Ashton Youboty, Mike Green, and Olympic gold medalists Laura Wilkinson, Simone Biles, and Chad Hedrick.

Klein is served by David Wayne Hooks Memorial Airport, one of just a few privately owned airports in the U.S. to have a Federal Aviation Administration control tower, and home to Civil Air Patrol's Delta Composite Squadron.

== Geography ==
Klein has a humid subtropical climate with a 9a hardiness zone. The area is susceptible to hurricanes and flooding.

The area serves as a fringe ecocline boundary between the Piney Woods, southern post oak savanna, and prairie land as an extension of the Western Gulf coastal grasslands.

Much of the original ecosystem had been cleared for farming. Since then, the community has been rapidly built up by subdivisions, businesses, and mixed land use — and thus very little of the area represents its native ecosystem.

Most of the core Klein area sits between Spring Creek to the north, separating Tomball to the northwest by Willow Creek, and Cypress Creek is the waterway that passes through the center of the greater Klein area. Both these creeks are tributaries to lower Spring Creek (Harris County, Texas) and ultimately Lake Houston.

Parcels along Cypress Creek contain a mix of older undisturbed bottomland forest, private residence, and well-maintained bike trails through public parks.

Prairie-like stretches of oak (Quercus virginiana) and various hardwoods, draped in Spanish moss, are present in and around the Raveneaux Country Club, Klein High School, and public spaces such as Meyer Park.

The Klein Kissing Tree is in Klein. In April 2020 the Texas A&M Forest Service designated it as one of several historic "kissing trees" in the state.

=== Flora ===
A well-preserved oxbow lake habitat can be found in the Ponderosa Walking Park. Dwarf palmetto Sabal minor and southern magnolia Magnolia grandiflora trees are found in the understory and near the edges of bodies of water and swamps, as well as bald cypress (Taxodium distichum) sweetgum (Liquidambar styraciflua), water oak (Quercus nigra), and black tupelo (Nyssa sylvatica) all being present.

=== Fauna ===
Reptiles in the community include common species like the red-ear slider turtle, green anole (Anolis carolinensis), and American green tree frog, as well as more precarious species such as the venomous Texas coral snake Micrurus tener, and the American alligator.

== Government and infrastructure ==
=== Local government ===
Harris County ESD 16, dba Klein Fire Department, headquartered at 16810 Squyres Road and operating with eight stations, serves areas considered to be Klein. Harris County ESD 16 is governed by five elected commissioners.

=== County, state, and federal representation ===
Klein is now located within Harris County Precinct 3 after redistricting following the 2020 Census. As of October 28, 2021, Tom S. Ramsey is the Precinct 3 County Commissioner.

The community is served by the Harris County Sheriff's Office District I Patrol, headquartered from the Cypresswood Substation at 6831 Cypresswood Drive.

The Harris Health System (formerly Harris County Hospital District) designated the Acres Homes Health Center for the ZIP code 77379. The designated public hospital is Lyndon B. Johnson Hospital in northeast Houston.

As of redistricting in 2023, Klein is split between two U.S. Congressional districts, the 2nd and the 38th. The community is located within the 7th Senate district and the 126th and the 150th House of Representatives districts in the Texas Legislature. The United States Postal Service operates the Klein Post Office at 7717 Louetta Road.

== Education ==
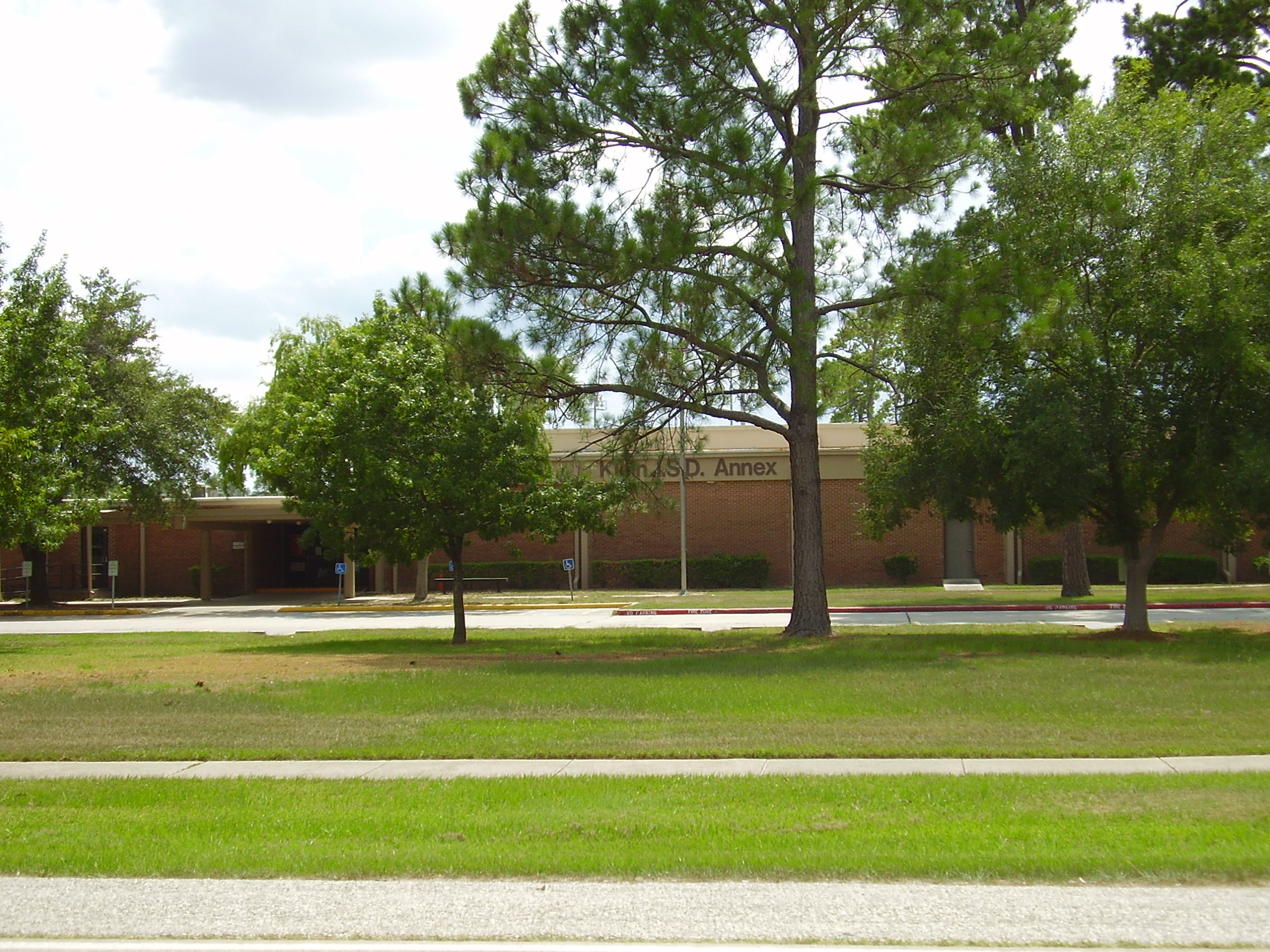
Klein ISD Annex

The Klein community is primarily served by the Klein Independent School District. However, a few minuscule portions of Klein are served by the Spring ISD and the Cypress-Fairbanks ISD.

The Klein ISD area joined the North Harris Montgomery Community College District (now Lone Star College) in 1998. The Texas Legislature designated Klein ISD a part of the Lone Star College district.

== Demographics ==
The 2016 estimated population for the Klein area was 200,805 people. The racial makeup of the town was 46.3 percent White, 32.4 percent Black, 0.6 percent Native American, 14.8 percent Asian, 0.1 percent Pacific Islander, 5.8 percent from other races. Persons of Hispanic origin, regardless of race, accounted for 28.9 percent of the population. About 21.7% of families live below the poverty line.

Black Americans have been well represented in the Kohrville community dating back since the Reconstruction era. Kohrville school served the area up until 1928, when students were consolidated into Rural High School District Number One, which eventually became Klein High School.

== Parks and recreation ==
Harris County Precinct 3 Commissioner operates the 7-acre (28,000 m^{2}) Klein Park. The park has four lighted athletic ball fields and toilet facilities.

Meyer Park, a 40-acre park straddling Cypresswood Road, has 38 soccer fields of various sizes for different age groups. The park also has four baseball fields, a playground, a dog park, toilet facilities, and pavilions.
