= Klein Cain High School =

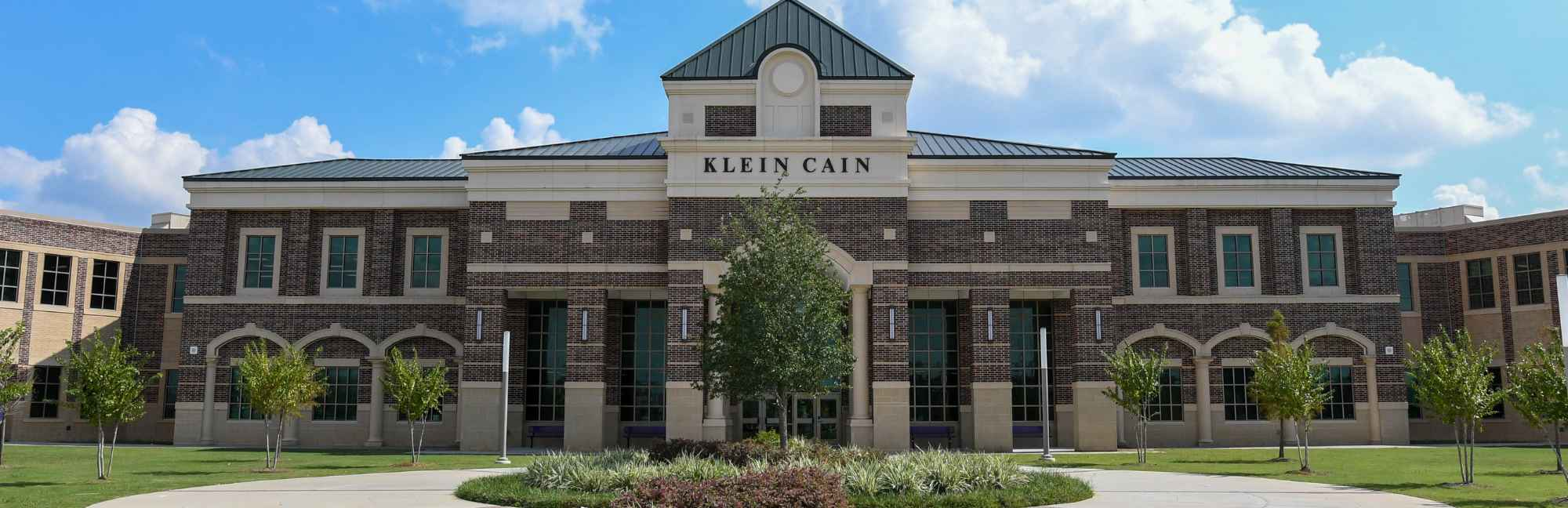

Location
- 10201 Spring Cypress Rd; Houston, (Harris County), Texas 77070; United States
- 30.0159349°N 95.5745422°W

Information
- Type: Public high school
- Motto: "Reign Cain"
- Established: 2017
- School district: Klein Independent School District
- Principal: Lauren Marti
- Faculty: 241.12 FTE (2022-23)
- Grades: 9-12
- Enrollment: 3,987 (2023-2024)
- Student to teacher ratio: 16.54
- Colors: Northwestern purple, silver, gray, white, and black
- Athletics: UIL 6A
- Athletics conference: University Interscholastic League
- Mascot: Ibis
- Team name: Hurricanes
- Newspaper: Cain Live
- Website: Klein Cain High School website

Klein Cain High School is a senior high school in unincorporated Harris County, Texas. A part of the Klein Independent School District, it opened in August 2017. Lauren Marti is the principal of the school. The sports team is the Hurricanes. Klein Cain opened in 2017 with 9th and 10th grade students, then added 11th graders in 2018 and 12th graders in 2019. The school is named after Jim Cain, who worked in Klein ISD for 35 years and in public education for 47 years.

== Campus ==
The campus, on an 80.3-acre (32.5 ha) has a capacity of 4,000 students. The campus, with three gymnasiums, a natatorium facility, career and vocational areas, and a dance area, has classrooms designed for student group work, using "L" shapes.

== History ==
The plans about building a new high school date back to funds that were linked with Klein ISD's 2008 and 2015 bond programs. The school was opened up for the first time in August 2017.

=== 2021 shooting threat ===
On December 8, 2021, a student made violent threats against the school on social media, prompting school officials and the local authorities to launch an investigation. The student was later identified and expelled with the district pursuing charges. This led to the prohibition of the use of backpacks on campus until the end of the fall semester.

== Attendance boundary ==
Areas that were rezoned to Klein Cain include portions of the Klein Oak High School zone that were north of Texas State Highway 99 (Grand Parkway) as well as rural communities along Doerre Road, areas north of Spring Cypress Road and west of Stuebner Airline Road, and the subdivisions of Vistas of Klein Lake, Laurel Glen, and Laurel Park.

== Demographics ==
For the 2020-21 school year, there were 3,777 students enrolled in grades 9–12. The ethnic distribution of students was:

- 0.3% American Indian/Alaska Native
- 10.1% Asian
- 13.4% Black
- 38% Hispanic
- 0.2% Native Hawaiian/Pacific Islander
- 35.2% White
- 2.7% Two or More Races

34.6% of students were eligible for free or reduced-price lunch.

== Academics ==
For the 2021-22 school year, the school received a B grade from the Texas Education Agency, with an overall score of 81 out of 100. The school received a B grade in two domains, School Progress (score of 82) and Student Achievement (score of 81), and a C grade in Closing the Gaps (score of 79). The school received one of the seven possible distinction designations for Academic Achievement in Top 25% Comparative Academic Growth.

== Notable alumni ==
- Jaydon Blue (Class of 2022), current running back for the Dallas Cowboys and former running back for the Texas Longhorns
- Matthew Golden (Class of 2022), former wide receiver for the Houston Cougars and the Texas Longhorns. Current wide receiver for the Green Bay Packers.
