= Remington Ranch, Texas =

Unincorporated community in Texas, US

Remington Ranch is a master-planned community located in unincorporated Harris County, Texas. The development, with 2,100 single-family houses, is located between Interstate 45 and the Hardy Toll Road. It is north of Greenspoint Mall and in proximity to George Bush Intercontinental Airport.

== History and development ==
In 2003 Dickson Partners, a Houston developer, purchased a 510-acre (210 ha) plot of land from Houston investors. The majority of the purchased land belonged to three families from Houston who, since the 1950s, had owned the land. Dickson intended to develop a new community on that site.

As of 2003, the houses were expected to be priced below $200,000. The price range of the houses was planned to be from the $80,000s to the $180,000s. KB Home, one developer, bought 143 acres (58 ha) from Dickson and planned to develop 900 houses priced from $80,000 to $130,000. The remaining single family acreage was to be developed by Newmark Homes and Parkside Homes into 1,200 houses. Two separate parcels of land, with a total of 51 acres (21 ha) of land, were to be used for commercial and other non-single family uses. Edminster Hinshaw Russ & Associates provided Remington Ranch's land planning and engineering. Mark Powell, vice president of Dickson Partners, said that the access to George Bush Intercontinental Airport, Greenspoint Mall, the Hardy Toll Road, and Interstate 45 motivated the company to develop the Remington Ranch property. In 2003, the company was negotiating with the school district with regard to the possibility of selling land for the development of a future elementary or middle school. Powell also cited the location in the Spring Independent School District as a factor in purchasing the land.

House construction was scheduled to begin in June 2004. Housing sales began in April 2004. The $65 million Remington Ranch development was scheduled to be sold out by 2008. By 2006, the homes offered were priced from the $80,000s to the $150,000s. By 2008 K. Hovanian Homes became a house builder in Remington Ranch. By 2009 Remington Ranch had a high foreclosure rate.

== Parks and recreation ==
The Park at the Remington Ranch

View of current development

The development was scheduled to include a recreation center with an Olympic-sized swimming pool and a playground area. The plans also included the establishment of neighborhood parks. The development also has a splash park and a barbecue area.

== Education ==
Remington Ranch is zoned to the Spring Independent School District.

Most residents are zoned to Milton Cooper Elementary School, while some are zoned to R.J. Hoyland Elementary School. All residents are zoned to Bammel Middle School and Dekaney High School. In February 2017 the district proposed redrawing the attendance boundaries of its middle schools. According to the proposed 2017-2018 middle school map, Remington Ranch will be reassigned from Bammel Middle School to Dueitt Middle School in the Spring census-designated place.

When Remington Ranch first opened, it was zoned to Clark Primary and Elementary School and Westfield High School. Cooper opened in 2005. The community was rezoned to Dekaney after Dekaney's opening in August 2007. Hoyland was completed in the summer of 2009.

Students have the option to attend Carl Wunsche Sr. High School, a career academy in the district, instead of their home school.

Areas in Spring ISD (and therefore Remington Ranch) are located in Lone Star College.
