= Northgate Forest, Texas =

Golf course community in Texas, US

Northgate Forest is a golf course community in unincorporated Harris County, Texas, United States, in Greater Houston. It is located directly off Farm to Market Road 1960, 13 miles (21 km) west of George Bush Intercontinental Airport and 18 miles (29 km) north of Downtown Houston.

== Government and infrastructure ==
The area is served by Harris County Sheriff's Office District I Patrol, headquartered from the Cypresswood Substation at 6831 Cypresswood Drive. The Klein Volunteer Fire Department provides fire protection services. In 1973, a fire station opened at Gladeridge Drive and Gladebrook Drive. In the 2000s a new Fire Station #2, replacing the former one, opened at 14640 Gladebrook Drive.

Northgate Forest is located in District 150 of the Texas House of Representatives, represented by Debbie Riddle, and is within District 7 of the Texas Senate, represented by Paul Bettencourt.

Northgate Forest is in Texas's 2nd congressional district, which has been represented by Dan Crenshaw in Congress since 2019.

== Education ==
Northgate Forest is zoned to Spring Independent School District.

Residents are zoned to Pat Reynolds Elementary School, Wells Middle School, and Westfield High School. Reynolds was originally named Oak Creek Elementary School.

The spokesperson for the subdivision's pro-Spring ISD secession group, Tom Mathews, said in 2007 that 45 school aged children resided in the community. Seven attended Spring ISD schools, and the rest attended private schools. According to Mathews, the zoned schools (Oak Creek, Wells, and Westfield) all were low performing, so most parents did not send their children to the zoned schools.

=== School district secession controversy ===
Northgate Forest garnered attention all over the Houston area when 190 residents filed a petition to withdraw from Spring Independent School District and join neighboring Klein Independent School District. The petition for detachment began circulating in December 2006, after Northgate residents helped defeat a bond issue for the district that November. Northgate Forest's primary complaints were that the district's SAT and TAKS scores had been declining consistently in recent years, that the district was spending money inefficiently, and that taxes were too high. Residents cited a section of the Texas Education Code that allows a given area to secede from the school district they are zoned to if another district will agree to absorb them. Jim McIngvale, Northgate Forest resident and owner of regional furniture retailer Gallery Furniture (and as such, well known on local radio and television commercials as "Mattress Mac,") said that he disagreed with the proposal.

In April 2007, the Klein ISD Board of Trustees denied Northgate's petition for detachment, shortly after Spring ISD unanimously rejected the proposal. Klein ISD stated that the petition did not fulfill all the legal requirements stipulated by the Texas Education Agency for the detachment to be valid. A small contingent of Northgate residents filed a new claim immediately after. Both school districts involved have declared they view the matter as closed.
