= Carl Wunsche Sr. High School =

Vocational school in Harris County, Texas

Location
- 900 Wunsche Loop; Spring, Harris County, Texas 77373; United States; 30.079990°N 95.426720°W

Information
- School type: Public school (U.S.)
- Teaching staff: 96.44 (FTE)
- Enrollment: 1,508 (2022-2023)
- Student to teacher ratio: 15.64
- Colors: Gold, Black & White
- Mascot: Phoenix
- Website: www.springisd.org/wunsche

Carl Wunsche Sr. High School is a career academy high school in unincorporated Harris County, Texas. Wunsche is in the Spring Independent School District and serves grades 9 through 12. Students who currently attend Dekaney High School, Spring High School and Westfield High School are allowed to attend Wunsche. As of 2017, about 850 students attend the school. The first official class of Wunsche graduated in 2019.

== Educational programs ==
Wunsche High School has many trade-related courses for students who are seeking more information and education in different areas. These areas include veterinary science, dentistry, robotics, cooking, and legal studies.

Students attending Wunsche select one of four areas of specialization, including:

- Health Sciences
- Technology and Wiki Development
- Legal Studies
- Business and Finance

Because of the school's focus on vocation, the school does not offer any athletic activities but students wishing to participate are provided with transportation back at their zoned campuses (either Dekaney, Spring, or Westfield).

== Academic Specialization Pathways ==
=== Professional Academy (Pro Tower) ===
==== Criminal Justice (Law Enforcement) ====
The criminal justice pathway is one of the major pathways provided in the Legal Studies area of specialization. This pathway allows students to explore Law enforcement duties and to interact with the functions of law enforcement. This pathway's classes teach students about the law, expectations for police officers, the experiences of police officers, and hands on training in police techniques such as the use of batons, offender profiling, crime scene analysis and many more. This pathway is taught by retired police officers criminal investigators and experienced law enforcement professionals.

==== Culinary Arts and Pastry ====
The Culinary Arts pathway allows for students to learn about a possible future career in the food service industry and even if they don't pursue a career in food service, students learn much about food safety, business management, and about how the food industry operates. The pathway is taught by food service professional Chef Stanley Idlebird.

==== Pre Law ====
This pathway is meant to teach students about the law profession and to prepare scholars for future careers as lawyers, paralegals, etc. The Pre Law pathway is taught by professionals in the Legal field.

=== Technology Academy (Tech Tower) ===
==== Computer Tech and Maintenance ====
Missing Info

==== Oil and Gas ====
Missing Info

==== Systems Engineering ====
Missing Info

== Academic performance ==
For the 2018–2019 school year, the school received an A grade from the Texas Education Agency, with an overall score of 90 out of 100. The school received an A grade in two domains, Student Achievement (score of 91) and School Progress (score of 91), and a B grade in Closing the Gaps (score of 86). The school received all of the seven possible distinction designations. This grade far outranked the average school district grade of a C.

== Demographics ==
In the 2018–2019 school year, there were 1,473 students. 26.6% were African American, 5.7% were Asian, 56.1% were Hispanic, 0.8% were American Indian, 9.2% were White, and 1.6% were two or more races. 64.5% of students were Economically Disadvantaged, 8.7% were English Language Learners, and 4.5% received Special Education services.

== Awards and distinctions ==
The school's main building, constructed in 2006, was recognized in 2007 by the CEFPI with the James D. MacConnell Award, an international annual design award for outstanding new educational facilities.

Other Awards Include:

Quark Net — Two CWHS physics students were selected to participate in a prestigious University of Houston summer fellowship program.

Culinary — CWHS is the only high school in Texas to receive a certification from the American Culinary Federation.

2008 Grand Prize Educational Design Showcase Award — innovation in planning and design

2008 National Educator Program School of Promise — National Model of Excellence

2008 National Career Pathway Network Business Partnership Award — Investex

2009 NCAC National Model Academies NW Chamber Community Development Award

2010 Organization for Economic Co-Operation and Development (OCED) — Review CTE systems to labor market requirements & develop tools to appraise CTE policy initiatives

Page showing the above awards
