= McIngvale =

McIngvale is a surname. Notable people with the surname include:

- Elizabeth McIngvale (born 1987), American activist
- Jim McIngvale (born 1951), American businessman
