= Paul John Hilbert =

American politician from Texas (1949–2001)

Paul Hilbert

Member of the Texas House of Representatives from the 150th district
- In office January 11, 1983 – October 29, 2001
- Preceded by: None (district created)
- Succeeded by: Debbie Riddle

Personal details
- Born: Paul John Hilbert; March 24, 1949 St. Louis, Missouri, U.S.
- Died: October 29, 2001 (aged 52) Spring, Texas, U.S.
- Party: Republican
- Education: Xavier University; South Texas College of Law

Paul John Hilbert (March 24, 1949 – October 29, 2001) was an American politician who served in the Texas House of Representatives for District 150 from 1983 until his death in 2001.

Born in St. Louis, he graduated from Xavier University and South Texas College of Law. He died of cancer on October 29, 2001. He is interred at Sunset Memorial Park and Mausoleum in Affton, Missouri and has a cenotaph at Texas State Cemetery.
