= Marqui Christian =

American football player (born 1994)

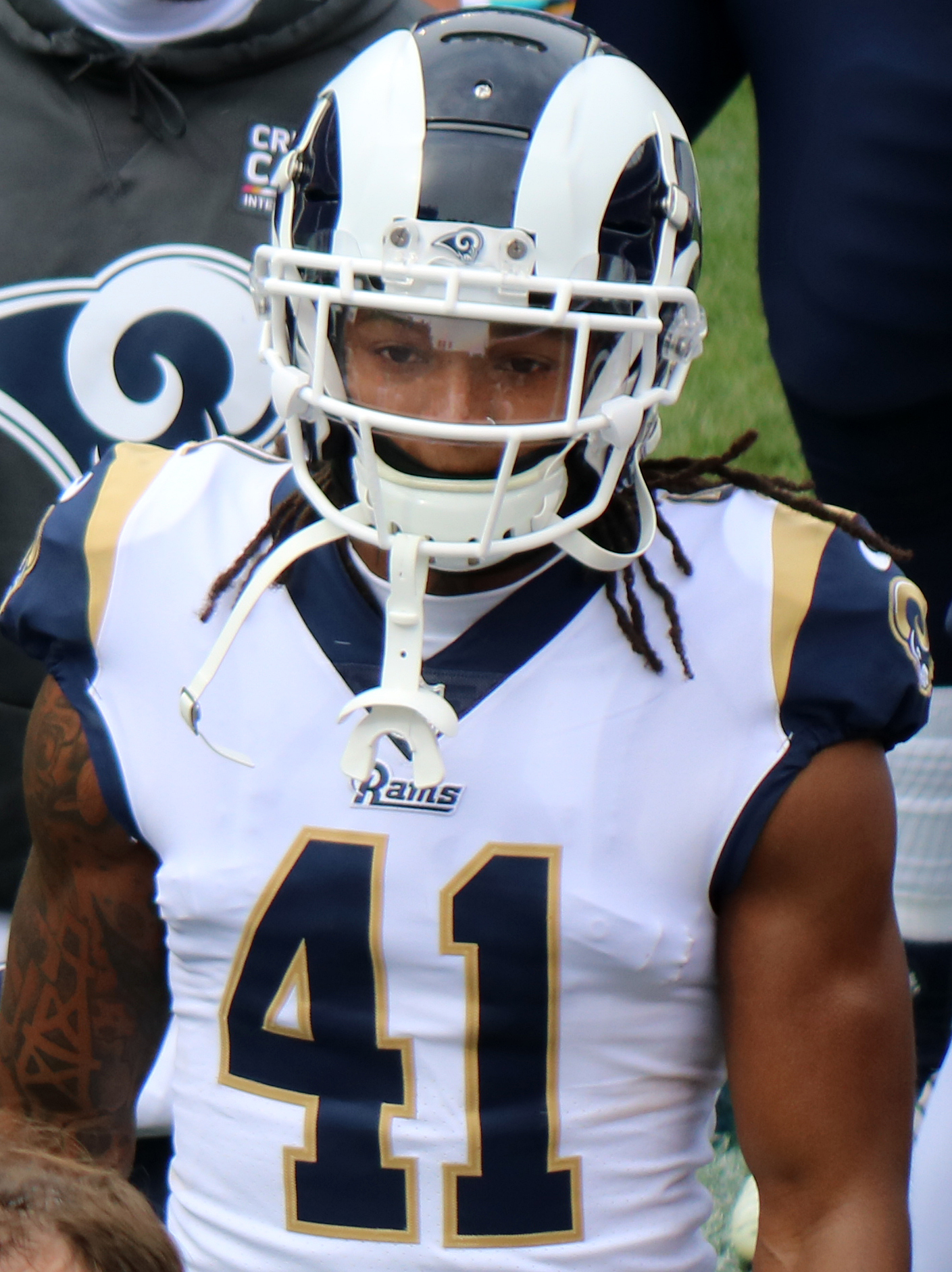
- Christian with the Los Angeles Rams in 2018

No. 41, 26, 37, 43, 23
- Position: Safety

Personal information
- Born: October 27, 1994 (age 32); Houston, Texas, U.S.
- Listed height: 5 ft 11 in (1.80 m)
- Listed weight: 195 lb (88 kg)

Career information
- High school: Spring (Spring, Texas)
- College: Midwestern State (2012–2015)
- NFL draft: 2016: 5th round, 167th overall pick

Career history
- Arizona Cardinals (2016); Los Angeles Rams (2016–2019); Chicago Bears (2020); New York Jets (2020); Chicago Bears (2020–2021)

Awards and highlights
- First-team Division II All-American (2015); Cliff Harris Award (2015); 3× First-team All-Lone Star (2013–2015)

Career NFL statistics
- Total tackles: 95
- Pass deflections: 4
- Stats at Pro Football Reference

Marqui Christian (born October 27, 1994) is an American former professional football player who was a safety in the National Football League (NFL). He played college football for the Midwestern State Mustangs. He was selected by the Arizona Cardinals in the fifth round of the 2016 NFL draft, and also was a member of the Los Angeles Rams, Chicago Bears, and New York Jets.

== Early life ==
Christian attended Spring High School in Spring, Texas.

== College career ==
Christian played college football at Midwestern State University from 2012 to 2015. He was named the Lone Star Conference's Top Male Athlete in 2016.

== Professional career ==
Pre-draft measurables
Height	Weight
5 ft 11 in (1.80 m)	199 lb (90 kg)
All values from NFL Combine

=== Arizona Cardinals ===
The Arizona Cardinals selected Christian in the fifth round with the 167th overall selection of the 2016 NFL draft. On September 27, 2016, he was waived by the team.

=== Los Angeles Rams ===
On September 28, 2016, Christian was claimed off waivers by the Los Angeles Rams. He was placed on injured reserve on December 19, 2016 with an ankle injury.

On December 27, 2017, Christian was placed on injured reserve with a shoulder injury.

=== Chicago Bears (first stint) ===
After his contract expired with the Rams in March 2020, Christian was suspended by the NFL for the first two weeks of the 2020 NFL season on June 18, 2020. He was signed by the Chicago Bears on August 12, 2020. After being reinstated from suspension, he was released and re-signed to the practice squad on September 21, 2020.

=== New York Jets ===
On September 23, 2020, Christian was signed by the New York Jets off the Bears practice squad. He was released on October 17; he played just one game for the Jets with no action on defense.

=== Chicago Bears (second stint) ===
Christian returned to the Chicago Bears' practice squad on October 23, 2020. He was elevated to the active roster on January 9, 2021, for the team's wild card playoff game against the New Orleans Saints, and reverted to the practice squad after the game. On January 11, 2021, Christian signed a reserve/futures contract with the Bears.
