= Benjamin Gay =

American football player (1980–2024)

Benjamin Gay Jr
No. 34
- Position: Running back

Personal information
- Born: February 28, 1980; Houston, Texas, U.S.
- Died: July 29, 2024 (aged 44); Colorado, U.S.
- Listed height: 6 ft 1 in (1.85 m)
- Listed weight: 227 lb (103 kg)

Career information
- High school: Spring (Spring, Texas)
- College: Garden City CC
- NFL draft: 2001: undrafted

Career history
- Edmonton Eskimos (2000)*; Cleveland Browns (2001); Indianapolis Colts (2002)*
- * Offseason or practice squad member only

Career NFL statistics
- Rushing yards: 172
- Rushing average: 3.4
- Touchdowns: 1
- Fumbles–lost: 4–3
- Stats at Pro Football Reference

Benjamin Stevenson Gay Jr. (February 28, 1980 – July 29, 2024) was an American professional football player who was a running back for the Cleveland Browns of the National Football League (NFL) in 2001.

Born in Houston, Gay was a running back at Spring High School in Spring, Texas. As a senior in 1997, he was a USA Today first-team All-American. He chose Baylor over Florida, Florida State, and Miami. However, five weeks into his freshman season in 1998, he was dismissed from the team for rules violations. He eventually enrolled at Garden City Community College. Playing nine games in 1999, he rushed for 1,442 yards and 17 touchdowns but was again dismissed from the team due to academic issues and rules violations. He took a job as a bouncer at a bar in Garden City, Kansas.

In 2000, he was signed by the Edmonton Eskimos, but was released after the first preseason game. On July 20, 2001, he was signed by the Cleveland Browns. He spent the 2001 season as a third-string running back behind James Jackson and Jamel White. On November 18, during a 27–17 Browns win at Baltimore, he recorded 18 NFL carries for 56 yards, including one touchdown.

On April 24, 2002, the Browns waived Gay, and he signed with the Indianapolis Colts five days later. The Colts released Gay on August 19.

Gay died in a traffic collision on July 29, 2024, at the age of 44.
