= Debbie Riddle =

American politician (born 1949)

Member of the Texas House of Representatives from the 150th district
- In office April 10, 2002 – January 10, 2017
- Preceded by: Paul John Hilbert
- Succeeded by: Valoree Swanson

Personal details
- Born: October 15, 1949 (age 76)
- Party: Republican
- Spouse: Mike Riddle
- Children: 3
- Occupation: Horse breeder

Deborah Young Riddle (born October 15, 1949) is a former Republican member of the Texas House of Representatives for District 150, which encompasses much of northwest Harris County in and about Houston, Texas. Riddle was defeated in the Republican primary by Valoree Swanson of Spring, Texas, who then claimed the seat in the general election held on November 8, 2016.

Considered a "staunch conservative" during much of her tenure in the House, Riddle was challenged from the right in her unsuccessful 2016 re-election campaign and defeated once again in an attempted comeback in 2022.

== Texas House of Representatives ==
In the Eightieth Texas Legislature, Riddle authored House Bill 8, which was the Texas version of Jessica's Law. The bill was signed into law by Governor Rick Perry on June 15, 2007 and became effective on September 1, 2007.

In the same session, she authored House Bill 1034, which added the words "one state under God," to the Texas State Pledge.

Riddle voiced opposition to a bill protecting breastfeeding in public, stating that women should be "modest".

=== Transgender bathroom bill ===
In the 84th Texas Legislature in 2015, Representative Riddle authored House Bill 1748, which would have jailed or fined transgender persons for using public restrooms (and other public facilities) that did not fit their birth chromosomes. The bill read as:

For the purpose of this section, the gender of an individual is the gender established at the individual's birth or the gender established by the individual's chromosomes. A male is an individual with at least one X chromosome and at least one Y chromosome, and a female is an individual with at least one X chromosome and no Y chromosomes. If the individual's gender established at the individual's birth is not the same as the individual's gender established by the individual's chromosomes, the individual's gender established by the individual's chromosomes controls under this section.

The bill also would have fined or jailed business owners for allowing the usage of restrooms that did not match the transgender person's birth chromosomes. The bill died quickly at the beginning of the legislative session.

=== House voting procedures ===
Riddle has defended the Texas House's unwritten policy to cast votes for absent and indisposed members on the basis that members of the legislature often do not get breaks to tend to any other business. She was shown on Austin's KEYE-TV voting for State Representative Edmund Kuempel. She has defended the House policy: "We have a lot of votes. We have a lot of amendments, and there's [sic] times when we don't break for lunch, and we don't break for dinner, we don't have bathroom breaks."

=== Committees ===
- Calendars
- Energy Resources
- Juvenile Justice and Family Issues (Vice-Chair)

== "Pit of hell" speech ==
In a March 6, 2003 interview with the El Paso Times, Riddle was quoted:

Where did this idea come from that everybody deserves free education, free medical care, free whatever? It comes from Moscow, from Russia. It comes straight out of the pit of hell. And it's cleverly disguised as having a tender heart. It's not a tender heart. It's ripping the heart out of this country."

The quote came after a Border and International Affairs Committee meeting during the Seventy-eighth Texas Legislature, in which the state faced a budget deficit of $10 billion, and was linked to a discussion Riddle had during the hearing regarding proposed healthcare cuts. The witness claimed that healthcare cuts would cause serious damage to border area hospitals, which Riddle countered with the claim that illegal immigrants were responsible for the financial strains.

Riddle was further quoted as saying "In a perfect world, I think it would be wonderful to open our doors to any and all, young and old, for health care. But this isn't a perfect world. We have got to decide if we are going to just open our borders for any and all that come through for health care, education, and services."

The comment was met almost instantly with both opposition and support from both ends of the political spectrum.

Texas Democrats claimed the statement was bigoted and "the product of an antipathy toward non-Anglo inhabitants of the state" and the Harris County Democratic Party called for her to resign from her position on the Border Affairs Committee. The Mexican American Legislative Caucus stated that "Our constitutional mandate comes not from the pit of hell. It comes from our state's forefathers."

At the same time, the Unidas Hispanic Women's Club and the Republican National Hispanic Assembly of Harris County praised Riddle for the quote and honored her at a dinner at the conclusion of session. Reggie Gonzalez, chairman for the Republican Hispanic Outreach Committee of Harris County said in a press release: "The liberal opposition to Representative Riddle's comments offends me as a Hispanic citizen. Their opposition only strengthens this negative stereotype of Hispanic immigrants, by implying that they need a lower standard of accountability. This implication is detrimental to the cause of Mexican-Americans everywhere."

== Terror babies ==
Riddle made the claim on Anderson Cooper 360 that Middle Eastern women were coming to the United States to give birth and were then returning to their home countries to raise their babies as terrorists who also retain American citizenship.

== Personal life ==
Riddle is a horse breeder who lives in Tomball with her husband Mike, an attorney. In 2010, she self-published Taking Back Your Community, Your Country and Your Kids, which she described as, "a practical roadmap for anyone who chooses to make a difference in their country and community." Riddle's daughter, Christine Riddle Butts, served as a Probate Judge in Harris County.

== Election results ==
=== 2016 re-election defeat ===
In 2016, Riddle was defeated in the Republican primary by Valoree Swanson, who led a four-candidate field with 12,143 votes (52.5 percent). Riddle trailed with 9,176 votes (39.6 percent). Two other contenders held the remaining 7.87 percent of the ballots cast.

=== 2014 ===
In the Republican primary election held on March 4, 2014, Riddle won re-nomination to a seventh term in the state House. In a low-turnout contest, she polled 7,820 votes (74.9 percent) to her challenger Tony Noun's 2,617 (25.1 percent).

Texas general election, 2014: House District 150
Party	Candidate	Votes	%	±%
Republican	Debbie Riddle (Incumbent)	24,317	72.4%	−8.03
Democratic	Amy Perez	9,253	27.56	−10.94
Majority		15,064	44.84%	−18.97

=== 2008 ===
Texas general election, 2008: House District 150
Party	Candidate	Votes	%	±%
Republican	Debbie Riddle (Incumbent)	43,896	64.37	−5.90
Democratic	Brad Neal	22,843	33.50	+3.78
Libertarian	Ken Petty	1,445	2.12	+2.12
Majority		21,053	30.87	−9.68

=== 2006 ===
Texas general election, 2006: House District 150
Party	Candidate	Votes	%	±%
Republican	Debbie Riddle (Incumbent)	22,585	70.27	−29.73
Democratic	Dot Nelson-Turnier	9,554	29.72	+29.72
Majority		13,031	40.55	−59.45

=== 2004 ===
Texas general election, 2004: House District 150
Party	Candidate	Votes	%	±%
Republican	Debbie Riddle (Incumbent)	44,425	100.00	+0.00
Majority		44,425	100.00	+0.00

=== 2002 ===
Texas general election, 2002: House District 150
Party	Candidate	Votes	%	±%
Republican	Debbie Riddle	26,174	100.00	+0.00
Majority		26,174	100.00	+0.00
