= Spring Fire Department =

Fire department located in Houston, Texas

Operational area
- Country: United States
- State: Texas
- CDP: Spring
- Address: 656 East Louetta Road Spring, TX 77373

Agency overview
- Established: May 1953
- Annual calls: 5729 (2022)
- Employees: 185 (2023)
- Annual budget: $29.1 million (2023)
- Staffing: Combination
- Fire chief: Scott C. Seifert
- EMS level: BLS

Facilities and equipment
- Stations: 9
- Engines: 6
- Platforms: 1
- Ladders: 2
- Rescues: 1
- Tenders: 2
- Wildland: 3

Website
- Official website

The Spring Fire Department (SFD) is a combination fire department located 25 miles (40 km) north of downtown Houston, Texas in the northern part of unincorporated Harris County in the community of Spring, Texas. On April 1, 2020, Harris County Emergency Services District No. 7 became the direct service provider of fire and rescue services to the 165,000 citizens (2023) who live within the 62 square miles served by the district.

Prior to April 1, 2020, Spring Volunteer Fire Association, Inc. was contracted by Harris County Emergency Services District No. 7 (HCESD7) to provide Fire and Rescue services from 35,000 citizens in 1980 to approximately 155,000 citizens (2020) that resided within the 62-square-mile (160 km^{2}) boundaries of HCESD7.

As a part of the (5) fire departments dispatched by Texas Emergency Communications Center, our department's designation for all units starts with the number 7. The fire suppression district in which Spring Fire Department serves, has emergency medical services that are provided by Harris County ESD No. 11, as the Spring Fire Department has no ambulances. The department does however provide BLS first responder services on priority medical calls such as cardiac and respiratory problems.

The territory served by Spring Fire Department includes the headquarters of ExxonMobil, headquarters of Hewlett-Packard Enterprise (HPE), headquarters of Southwestern Energy and has other major companies within its territory such as FedEx, and Amazon.

== History ==
The Spring Volunteer Fire Association (SVFA) received its initial charter on May 29, 1953, and started out with seven volunteer members and was called the Spring Volunteer Fire Department (SVFD). The SVFA/SVFD was entirely funded by private donations, including equipment hand-built by members of the community.

In 1983, the members of the department formed Harris County Rural Fire Prevention District #1. This allowed the collection of ad valorem (property) tax up to 3 cents per $100 valuation. In 1997, the members of the department and RFPD #1 had an election to form Harris County Emergency Services District No. 7 (HCESD7). An Emergency Services District can assess an ad valorem (property) tax up to 10 cents per $100 valuation. This means that the owner of a house that is valued at $100,000 pays a maximum of $100 per year for fire protection for all of its occupants.

In the mid-2010s it was decided to rebrand the "Spring Volunteer Fire Department" to "Spring Fire Department" since the organization evolved from a completely volunteer fire department to a combination fire department.
