= Spring Independent School District =

School district in Texas, United States

Address
- 16717 Ella Blvd. Houston, Texas, 77090; United States

District information
- Type: Public
- Grades: Pre-K through 12
- Established: 1935
- Superintendent: Kregg Cuellar (interim)
- School board: 7 member Board of Trustees
- Governing agency: Texas Education Agency
- Schools: 43 (2022-23)
- NCES District ID: 4841220

Students and staff
- Students: 34,415 (2022-23)
- Staff: 5,200 (2022-23)

Other information
- Website: www.springisd.org

Spring Independent School District is a school district based in the Gordon M. Anderson Leadership Center in unincorporated Harris County, Texas, United States. It is located in north Harris County.

The district serves over 34,000 pre-kindergarten through twelfth-grade students in a diverse district located 20 miles (32 km) north of downtown Houston in a suburban area of Harris County that spans 57 square miles (150 km^{2}). As of May 2023, the district's ethnic breakdown is 51.6 percent Hispanic, 38.0 percent African American, 4.7 percent White and 2.0 percent Asian.

Spring ISD serves a small portion of Houston, and portions of unincorporated Harris County including the community of Spring.

Spring ISD earned an overall "B" rating under the Texas Education Agency's accountability ratings system for the 2021-2022 school year. More than half of its campuses earned an "A" or "B" rating, with the district earning a cumulative score of 81.

== History ==
Spring ISD formed in 1935 from the combination of the Harrell Common School District and the Spring Common School District.

The district's demographics changed as time passed. In the 1995–1996 school year the district had 28% low-income students. Its racial demographics were 56% White, 20% Black, and 18% Hispanic. In the 2002-2003 school year the low income percentage was 43.9%. In the 2005-2006 school year the district had 55% low-income students. The demographics included 39% Black, 33% Hispanic, and 23% White. These demographic changes caused tension as, in 2007, residents of Northgate Forest unsuccessfully attempted to withdraw from Spring ISD. By 2012-2013 the percentage of low income students was 73.2%.

In 2005, there were plans to rearrange the attendance boundaries of several elementary schools due to higher than anticipated growth.

In 2006, its two high schools, Spring and Westfield, had a combined population of 7,500. Dr. Robert Sanborn, the president and CEO of the organization Children at Risk, said that Spring ISD should have had schools in the top ten high schools featured in the Houston Press article "These Kids Go to the Best Public High School in Houston" as Humble ISD and Spring Branch ISD did. Instead, both Spring ISD schools ranked in the "Tier Two" list.

In 2007, the district held a bond election.

In 2008 Spring ISD's virtual school opened.

=== Northgate Forest secession proposal ===
Northgate Forest, a subdivision, garnered attention all over the Houston area when 190 residents filed a petition to withdraw from Spring Independent School District and join neighboring Klein Independent School District. The petition for detachment began circulating in December 2006, after Northgate residents helped defeat a bond issue for the district that November. Northgate Forest's primary complaints were that the district's SAT and TAKS scores had been declining consistently in recent years, that the district was spending money inefficiently, and that taxes were too high. Residents cited a section of the Texas Education Code that allows a given area to secede from the school district they are zoned to if another district will agree to absorb them. Jim McIngvale, an area resident and salesman also known as "Mattress Mac", said that he disagreed with the proposal.

In April 2007, the Klein ISD Board of Trustees denied Northgate's petition for detachment, shortly after Spring ISD unanimously rejected the proposal. Klein ISD stated that the petition did not fulfill all the legal requirements stipulated by the Texas Education Agency for the detachment to be valid. A small contingent of Northgate residents filed a new claim immediately after. Both school districts involved have declared they view the matter as closed.

The spokesperson for the group, Tom Mathews, said in 2007 that 45 school-aged children resided in the community. Seven attended Spring ISD schools, and the rest attended private schools. According to Mathews, the schools were low performing, so most parents did not send their children to the zoned schools.

=== 2010s and 2020s ===
ExxonMobil's offices in the Spring area were being established around 2015, contributing to growth in the Spring area.

In February 2017 the district proposed building one new middle school and one ninth grade center for each of its comprehensive high schools, as well as redrawing the attendance boundaries of its middle schools and high schools; all of the changes would take effect by the 2020-2021 school year. The district plans to use Interstate 45 as a boundary for its middle schools. According to the proposed 2020-2021 high school map, the eastern portion of the Spring census-designated place will be reassigned from Spring High School to Dekaney High School. Due to the impact of the COVID-19 pandemic in Texas the district delayed the high school boundary changes until at least 2022-2023.

== Schools ==
All of the schools are located in unincorporated Harris County.

=== Elementary schools ===
- George E. Anderson Elementary School
  - Anderson, which opened in 1979, was named after a board member. It was a 1989-90 National Blue Ribbon School.
- Bammel Elementary School, home of the Bulldogs
  - Bammel, the second Spring ISD elementary school, opened in 1965. It was named after the Charly Bammel family. In 2010 the school's current two-story facility opened.
- Joseph S. Beneke Elementary School, home of the Bears
  - Beneke, which opened in 1986, was named after a former board member.
- Carolee Booker Elementary School, home of the Bengals
  - Booker, which opened in 2008, is named after Carolee Booker Jordan King, a teacher.
- Chet Burchett Elementary School, home of the Bobcats
  - Opened in August 2005, Burchett is named after a former board member.
- B. F. Clark Primary School (PreK-1st), home of the Cats
  - Clark Elementary School opened in 1991. It was named after a former SISD employee who served as a bus driver, coach, counselor, textbook custodian, principal, and teacher. In 2005 Clark Primary and Intermediate together had about 1,500 students, which meant the school was at capacity.
- B. F. Clark Intermediate School (2nd-5th), home of the Cats
  - Opened in 2003, Clark Intermediate is across the street from and has the same namesake as Clark Primary.
- Milton Cooper Elementary School, home of the Cowboys
  - Cooper, which opened in 2005, is named after a former SISD administrator.
- Ralph Eickenroht Elementary School
  - The school, which opened in 2009, is named after a former music teacher.
- Heritage Elementary School, home of the Husky
  - Opened in 2000, Heritage is SISD's 15th elementary school. Heritage was named to reflect upon the ethnic heritages of the students and to honor the surrounding community.
- Pearl M. Hirsch Elementary School, home of the Hawks
  - Hirsch opened in 1978 and was named after a Spring ISD teacher.
- R.J. Hoyland Elementary School (opening August 2009)
  - Hoyland, which opened in 2009, is named after Dr. R.J. Hoyland III, a board member.
- Mildred I. Jenkins Elementary School, home of the Jaguars
  - Jenkins, which opened in 1976, was named after a school nurse.
- Donna C. Lewis Elementary School
  - Lewis, which opened in 2006, is named after a longtime volunteer.
- Joan Link Elementary School, home of the Leopards
  - Link opened in 1982. It was named after the secretary of the SISD superintendent and board of trustees.
- Helen Major Elementary School, home of the AllStars
  - Major, which opened in 2009, is named after a teacher.
- Gloria Marshall Elementary School, home of the Marlins
  - Marshall, which opened in 2011, was named after a Spring ISD administrator who served as a teacher and principal. It is the first Leadership in Energy and Environmental Design gold-certified school in SISD.
- Ginger McNabb Elementary School, home of the Knights
  - McNabb, which opened in 2006, is named after a teacher.
- Otto H. Meyer Elementary School, home of the Mustangs
  - Meyer, which opened in 1976, was named to honor Otto H. Meyer and Avalt H. Meyer, who served on the SISD board of trustees. As of 2005 the school had an official capacity of 837 students. The school had over 20 portable buildings in 2005 as it had 1,163 students that year.
- Northgate Crossing Elementary School, home of the Navigators
  - The school, which opened in 2008, is named after the Northgate Crossing neighborhood.
- Ponderosa Elementary School, home of the Ponies
  - Ponderosa, which opened in 1970, is named after its subdivision. In 2005 the school had 730 students, making the school at capacity. As of 2010 it is one of three two-story elementary schools in SISD.
- Pat Reynolds Elementary School, home of the Armadillos
  - The school opened in 1972 as Oak Creek Elementary School, after the subdivision. It was renamed in 2005 after an SISD administrator.
- Salyers Elementary School, home of the
  - Opened in 1959 as Spring Elementary School, it was the first dedicated elementary school of Spring ISD. It was also the first Spring ISD facility to be air conditioned. It was renamed in 1986, after J.O. Salyers, a board member, and Gertie Mae Salyers, a PTA member. The new location was built in 2003.
- Lewis Eugene Smith Elementary School
  - Smith opened in 1986. Its namesake served as a business teacher, the principal of Spring High School, and an assistant superintendent.
- Deloras E. Thompson Elementary School, home of the Timberwolves
  - Thompson opened in 1996. It was named after a board member. Cleo Wadley became the principal in 2013.
- John A. Winship Elementary School, home of the Wildcats
  - Winship, which opened in 1972, was named after former superintendent John Winship. Winship Elementary School's classes began in the northern hemisphere fall 1972; the Winship campus opened on December 15 of that year.

=== Middle schools ===
Zoned schools

- Rickey C. Bailey Middle School, home of the Buccaneers
  - Bailey opened in August 2006 and was dedicated on October 15 of that year. Named after a board member, Bailey is across the street from Burchett Elementary.
- The School for International Studies at Bammel
  - Formerly known as Bammel Middle School, Bammel was the second middle school in SISD. It was named after the Charly Bammel family. In January 2004 the school moved to a new location. After the move, the previous location became the Westfield Ninth Grade Center. In 2009 that facility became Dr. Edward Roberson Middle School, A Math, Science and Fine Arts Academy. In 2021, Bammel Middle School was renamed The School for International Studies at Bammel and became Spring ISD's first ever school to serve grades Pre-K through 8th grade. Students in grades PK-3 have to apply for the school and are part of a Dual Language program. Students in grades 6-8 still attend Bammel based on zoning boundaries.
- Stelle Claughton Middle School
  - Claughton, which opened in 2003, is SISD's fifth middle school. It was named after Stelle Claughton Lacefield, an administrator and teacher.
- O. B. Dueitt Middle School, home of the Eagles
  - Dueitt opened in 1980. It was named after a board member who was a member of a family that first settled in Spring around 1876.
- Twin Creeks Middle School
  - Twin Creeks opened in 1984. It is named for its location between two creeks, the Cypress Gully and Spring Creek. It replaced Wunsche Middle School.
- Edwin M. Wells Middle School opened in 1977 and was named after an SISD school board member.
- SpringWoods Village Middle School opened in 2019.

School of Choice

- Dr. Edward Roberson Middle School, a Math, Science and Fine Arts Academy
  - Roberson opened in 2009. Its facility was the home of Bammel Middle School and later the Westfield Ninth Grade Center.
- Spring Leadership Academy
  - Spring Leadership Academy opened in 2019.

=== High schools ===
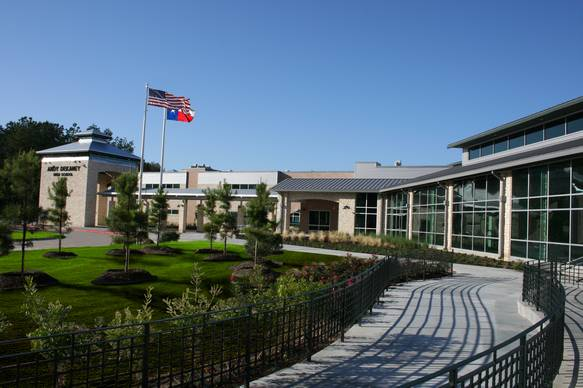
Andy Dekaney High School

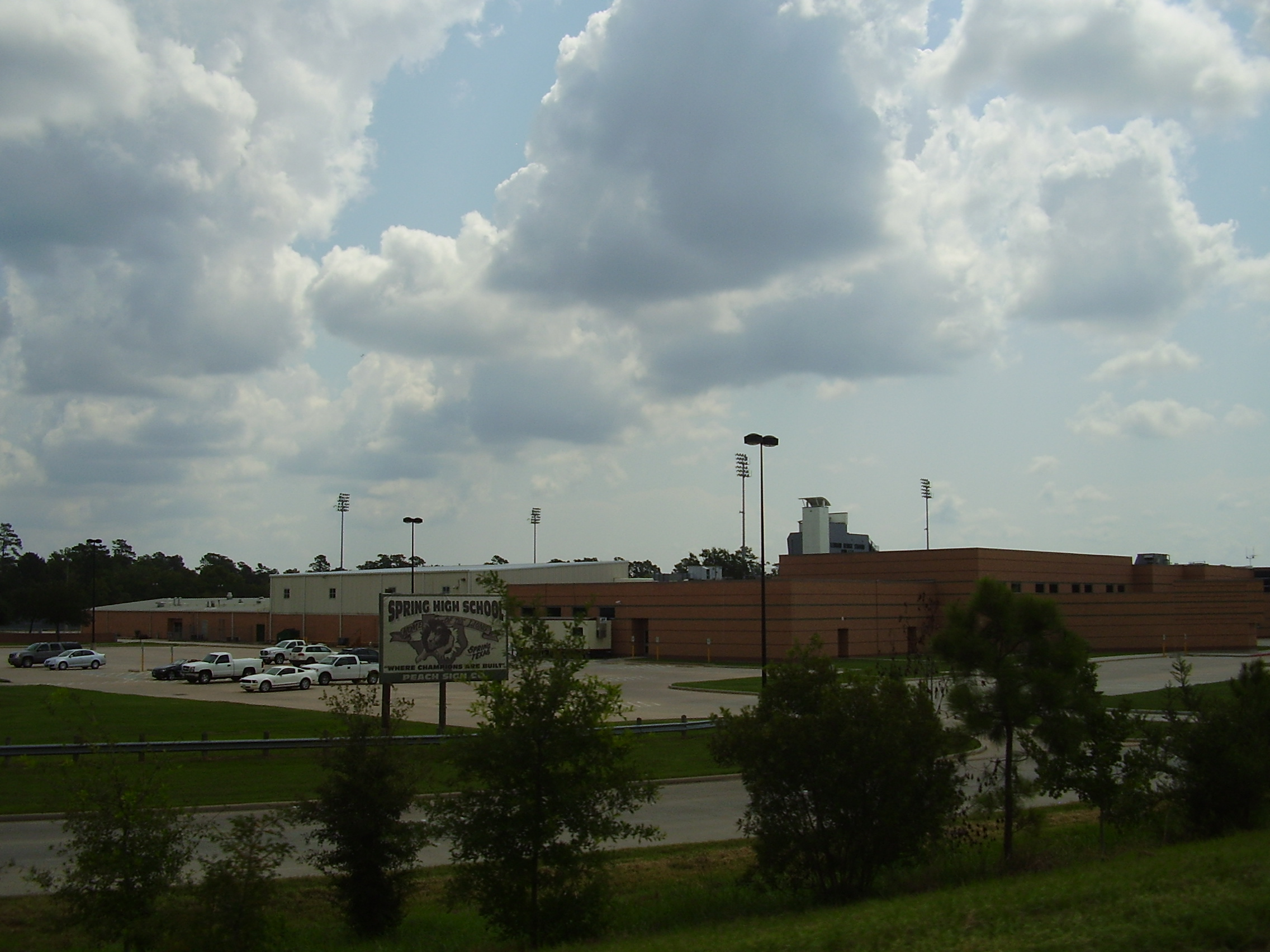
Spring High School

Zoned schools

- Andy Dekaney High School, home of the Wildcats
  - Dekaney opened in 2007.
- Spring High School, home of the Lions
  - Spring opened in 1969
- Westfield High School, home of the Mustangs (opened in 1981)

Schools of Choice

- Carl Wunsche Sr. High School, home of the Phoenix - Career Academy of Spring ISD (opened Fall 2006)
- Spring Early College Academy - Early College High School of Spring ISD (opened Fall 2011) *formerly known as Early College Academy at Southridge
- Momentum High School
  - Momentum High School opened in 2022.

=== Other schools ===
- Richey Academy (soon to be renamed to Spring Empowerment Academy) - Spring ISD's Disciplinary Alternative Education Program for middle school and high school students in Spring ISD who have been reassigned due to conduct or behavioral issues (Opened Fall 2015)

=== Former schools ===
- Southwell School – a segregated school for African Americans, Southwell operated on the property of what is now B. F. Clark Park from 1925 to 1945.
- Wunsche School – the Wunsche family donated 13 acres (5.3 ha) of land along Spring-Cypress Road for a school site in 1935; the donation required that the district name the school after Carl Wunsche, a family ancestor. Wunsche served middle and high school. An addition serving elementary school students opened in 1947. In 1958 the elementary school students were moved out. In 1969 Wunsche became the district's first middle school. In 1983 the campus closed, and it was replaced by Twin Creeks Middle School. The facility was renovated to serve as a multipurpose campus.

== Other facilities ==
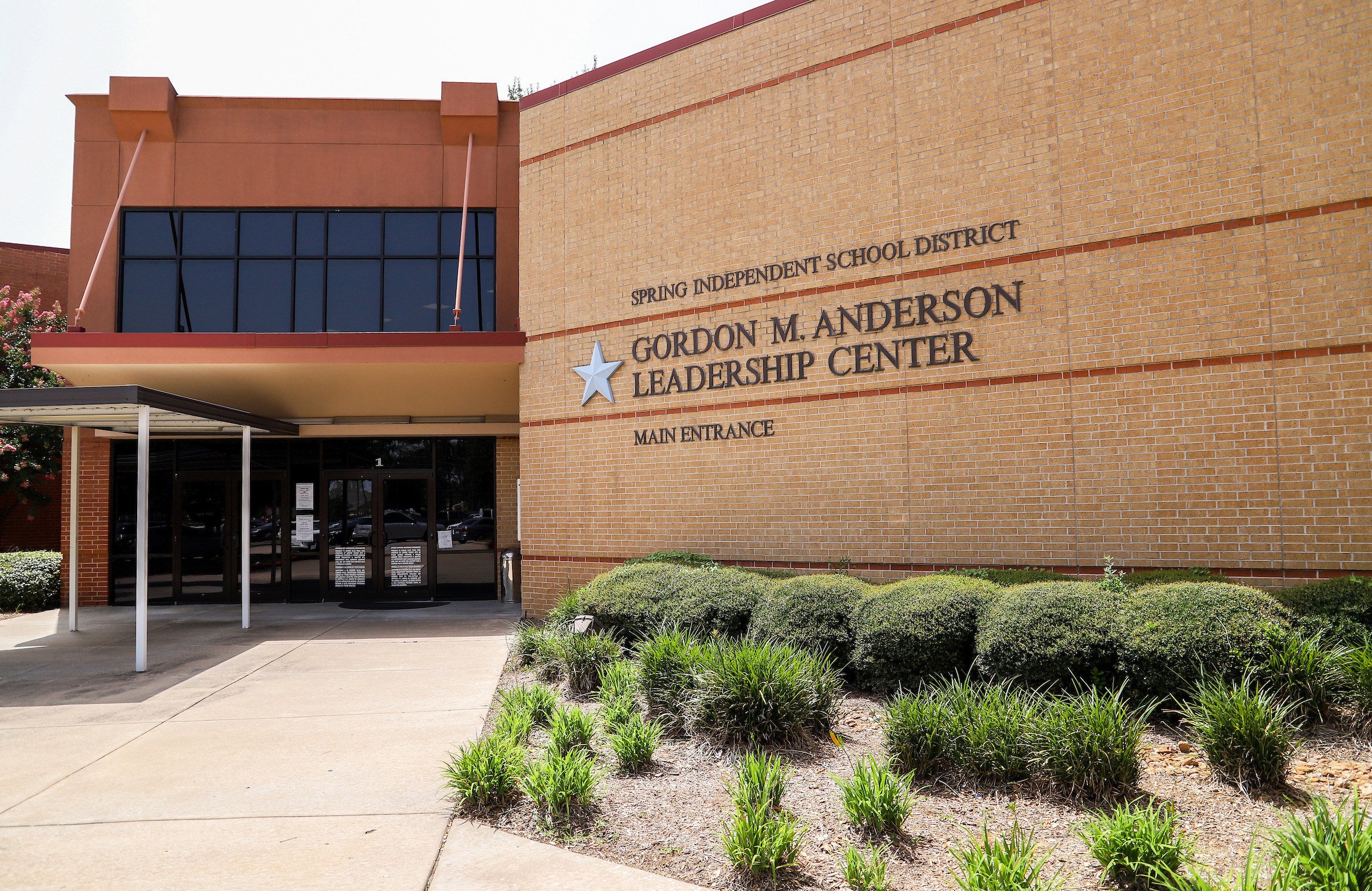
Gordon M. Anderson Leadership Center - Spring ISD

- Gordon M. Anderson Leadership Center – The district's administration building, Anderson received its current name in 2001. It was named after a former superintendent.
- L. C. Nagy Exhibition Pavilion – The district's show barn, Nagy opened in 1997. It was named after the L.C. Nagy family.
- Leonard George Stadium – Opened in 2000, the stadium is located behind Spring High School. It was named after the coach.
- James C. Leo Drive – An access road between Bailey Middle School and Burchett Elementary School, Leo was named in 2005 after a former SISD administrator.

In 2015 the district acquired the 12,340-square-foot (1,146 m^{2}) former North Harris County Family YMCA. The YMCA had closed on September 30, 2014.

In 2019 the district announced plans to open TeachUp Spring, a teacher training center, in an ex-ITT Tech facility along Interstate 45 (North Freeway), in May of that year.

Spring ISD opened Planet Ford Stadium in 2019. Planet Ford Stadium, located at 23802 Cypresswood Dr. in Spring, is the home field for the Spring, Dekaney and Westfield high school football teams. The district reached an agreement with Randall Reed's Planet Ford for the naming rights to the stadium and adjoining community center known as the Randall Reed Center.

== Demographics ==
From 2008 to 2012, the number of Hispanic students increased by 3.8%, the number of black students increased by 1.4%, the number of White students decreased by 6%, and the number of Asian students decreased by 0.5%. The number of students with low economic statuses increased by 7.5% and the number of limited English proficient and/or bilingual students increased by 2.7%. The demographic trends were similar to the state averages of Texas.

In 2015 the district had 36,950. The enrollment was projected to grow by 1,800 in five years and the annual growth rate was 0.97%.

== Academic performance ==
In the 2011-2012 school year, the passing rates for the 10th grade Texas Assessment of Knowledge and Skills (TAKS) tests for Spring ISD were as follows: 92% for social studies, 90% in English, 65% in science, and 62% in mathematics; the English and social studies percentages were similar to the state averages while the other two were about 10 points below the state averages. The 11th graders that year scored above the state averages in all categories.

== Spring ISD Police Department ==
The Spring ISD Police Department, established in 1991, moved to its current location at 420 Lockhaven Dr., Houston, TX 77073 in 2018. The police department was previously located at 210 North Forest Blvd and 15330 Kuykendahl Road.

Spring ISD police officers work for the district that commissions them. Under the Education Code of the State of Texas, school district police officers are supervised by the Chief of Police of the school district. This matter falls under 37.081 of the Texas Education Code. The Chief of Police answers to the Superintendent or his/her designee.

== See also ==
- List of school districts in Texas
