= Dekaney High School =

Andy Dekaney High School
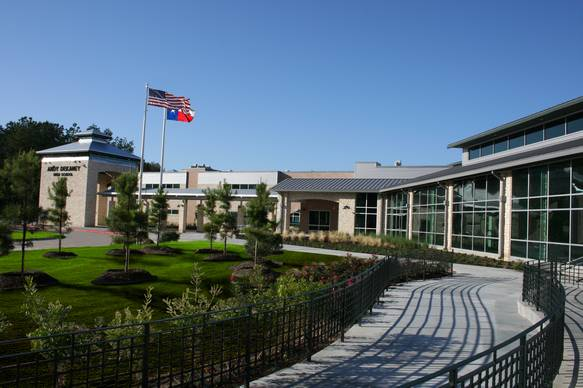

Location
- 22351 Imperial Valley Drive; Houston, Texas; United States; 30.0175°N 95.4209°W

Information
- Type: Public school
- Motto: " Leading The Way To Excellence "
- Established: 2007
- School district: Spring Independent School District
- Superintendent: Rodney E. Watson
- Principal: Alonzo Reynolds III
- Teaching staff: 131.48 (on an FTE basis)
- Enrollment: 2485 (2024–2025)
- Student to teacher ratio: 18.90
- Colors: Kentucky blue, silver, white, and black
- Athletics conference: UIL 6A
- Mascot: Wildcats Newspaper = The Paw Print
- Website: Dekaney High School

Andy Dekaney High School is a public secondary school located at 22351 Imperial Valley Drive and Bammel Road in unincorporated Harris County, Texas, United States, with a ZIP code of 77073.

Dekaney serves a small portion of Houston and sections of unincorporated Harris County. Dekaney serves the communities of Cranbrook, Glen Abbey, and Remington Ranch.

The school, which serves grades 9 through 12, is a part of the Spring Independent School District.

== History ==
Dekaney High School, which opened in 2007, is named after Andy Dekaney, a former school district board member. It opened because too many students attended Westfield High School, which at the time was the largest high school in the nation by student enrollment.

In 2015 the school administration announced that it would create "small learning communities" within Dekaney in order to improve academic performance, and each would have a dedicated section of the school. This plan was discontinued starting with the 2017–2018 school year.

In February 2017 the district proposed redrawing the attendance boundaries of its high schools; this would take effect in the 2020–2021 school year. The district also plans to establish one ninth grade center for each comprehensive high school. According to the proposed 2020-2021 high school map, the eastern portion of the Spring census-designated place will be reassigned from Spring High School to Dekaney High. The school district delayed the rezoning at least until after the 2021–2022 school year due to the COVID-19 pandemic in Texas, as it determines how the pandemic changed student enrollment patterns in Spring ISD.

== Academic performance ==
The school received the Texas Education Agency (TEA) ratings of "academically unacceptable" or "improvement required", the lowest rankings, in 2008, 2011, 2013, and 2017. The school received a rating of "not rated" in lieu of "improvement required" in 2018 due to the impact of Hurricane Harvey.

Nora Olabi of The Spring Observer wrote in 2015 that Dekaney "has struggled to maintain high academic standards."

For the 2018–2019 school year, the school received a D grade from the Texas Education Agency, with an overall score of 69 out of 100. The school received a D grade in two domains, Student Achievement (score of 65) and School Progress (score of 69), and a C grade in Closing the Gaps (score of 70). The school did not receive any of the seven possible distinction designations.

== Student discipline ==
In 2012 Steve Jansen of the Houston Press reported that the school had student discipline issues.

== Student body ==
For the 2025-2026 school year, there are 2,344 students. 52.8% are Hispanic, 42.2% are Black, 1.7% are Two or More Races, 1.7% are White, 1.3% are Native American, 1.0% are Asian, and 0.1% are Pacific Islander. 85.9% of students are economically disadvantaged.

== Clubs and organizations ==
- SkillsUSA
- Skills Culinary Arts
- Dekaney Choir
- Wildcat Band
- Wildcat Wire
- wildcat Yearbook
- Student Council
- DHS Cheerleaders
- Dekaney Diamonds
- Chess Club
- NJROTC
- Christian Club
- Future Farmers of America
- Thespian Society
- Dekaney Colorguard
- Teen Court
- HOSA
- Dekaney Fit Club
- DECA

== Feeder schools ==
Middle schools

- Bammel Middle School
- Rickey C. Bailey Middle School
- Edwin M. Wells Middle School
- Stelle Claughton Middle School
- Twin Creeks Middle School
- Dr. Edward Roberson Middle School
- Dueitt Middle School
- Springwoods Village Middle School
- Spring Leadership Academy

Elementary schools

- Bammel
- Beneke
- Clark Primary
- Clark Intermediate
- Cooper
- Heritage
- Lewis
- Link
- Meyer
- Ponderosa
- Reynolds (Oak Creek)
- Thompson
- Booker
- Salyers

== Notable alumni ==
- Amber Holcomb (Class of 2012), singer who competed on American Idol
- D'Juan Hines (Class of 2013), football player
- Trey Williams (Class of 2012), football player
- Joe Kilgore (Class of 2014), basketball player
- Jalon Edwards-Cooper (Class of 2015), football player
- Joshuah Bledsoe (Class of 2017), football player
- Joshua Cephus (Class of 2019), football player
- Tanook Hines (Class of 2025), football player
