= A'Yonna Kellum =

American politician

Member-elect of the Texas House of Representatives from the 150th district
- Assuming office January 2027
- Succeeding: Valoree Swanson

Personal details
- Party: Democratic
- Education: Prairie View A&M University

A'Yonna Kellum is an American politician. A member of the Democratic Party, she is the member-elect for the 150th district of the Texas House of Representatives.

== Electoral history ==
2026 Texas House of Representatives election: District 150
Party	Candidate	Votes	%	±%
Democratic	A'Yonna Kellum	34,854	50.6%	
Republican	Valoree Swanson	34,010	49.4%	
