= Valoree Swanson =

American politician

Valoree Hanson Swanson

Member of the Texas House of Representatives from the 150th district
- Incumbent
- Assumed office January 10, 2017
- Preceded by: Debbie Riddle
- Succeeded by: A'Yonna Kellum (elect)

Personal details
- Born: Valoree Hanson; September 22, 1957 (age 69)
- Party: Republican
- Education: Baylor University (BBA)
- Occupation: Real estate broker
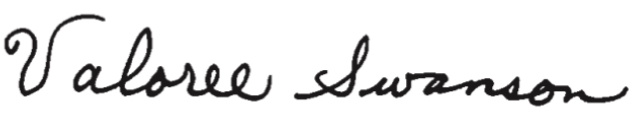
- Signature
- Website: Campaign website

Valoree Hanson Swanson (born September 22, 1957) is an American politician who serves as a Republican member of the Texas House of Representatives. She was first elected in 2016, when she unseated incumbent Debbie Riddle in the Republican primary election. She then defeated Democrat Michael Shawn Kelly in the 2016 general election.

== Political career ==
In April 2017, Swanson attached an amendment to a $218.2 billion House appropriations bill which would have compelled all 150 House members to vote on April 6 on State Senator Lois Kolkhorst's bathroom bill, which had already cleared the Senate with the strong support of Lieutenant Governor Dan Patrick. If adopted, the legislation would have required persons to use the public restroom which corresponds with their physical genitalia, rather than their personal view of their own gender. Many businesses and sports groups have strongly opposed the measure. House leaders refused to permit a vote on the Swanson amendment, which was instead sent as part of "Article XI". (Note: Within the biennial General Appropriations Act, Article XI is reserved for items (appropriations and/or riders) which aren't part of the actual act but are essentially a "wish list" for consideration later by the conference committee reconciling the differences in the House and Senate budgets.)

Swanson is the author of HB 1485, which would in her words "free our teachers [from] fear of frivolous accusations" when they "criticize scientific theories". The bill listed, among other subjects, evolution and climate change, both of which have a clear scientific consensus. She called her proposed legislation protection of "academic freedom" of grade school and high school classrooms. Swanson claimed that "certain scientists have faked the temperature results [on climate change]" and that faculty must be freed to offer alternative views.

Swanson won her second term in the House in the general election held on November 6, 2018. With 40,864 votes (57.8 percent), she again defeated Democrat Michael Shawn Kelly, who polled 29,837 (42.2 percent).

Swanson supports a ban on Democrats being given committee chairmanships as long as the Republicans hold the majority of seats in the Texas House.

During the 88th Session of the Texas Legislature, Swanson sponsored Senate Bill 15 (Save Women’s Sports Act) in the Texas House. It was passed by the Texas House on May 17, 2023, with 93 for and 49 against.

On May 27, 2023, Swanson voted no to impeach Ken Paxton.

== Political positions ==
A questionnaire from iVoterGuide asked if marijuana should be legalized and regulated like tobacco and alcohol. She strongly disagreed.

Swanson opposes abortion. She filed a measure that would expand "prohibited practices" and would take medical licenses away from doctors that perform abortions.

Swanson signed a court brief that asked the Texas Supreme Court to re-look into the case allowing same-sex couples to receive benefits.

In 2016 during her election campaign, Swanson accused her primary opponent of killing a bill that would protect Texans from Sharia law. Her campaign website stated: "I will work to stop any part of Shariah law ever being used in Texas or this Nation with no excuses or apologies needed! My opponent voted to kill a bill (“ALAC”-American Law for American Courts) which would have protected Texans from Sharia law."
