= Elizabeth McIngvale =

American activist (born 1987)

Elizabeth McIngvale (born 1987) is the founder of Peace of Mind, a non-profit organization for people with obsessive–compulsive disorder (OCD). She herself was diagnosed with OCD at the age of 12, and at age 18 became the national spokesperson for the International OCD Foundation. She lives in Houston, Texas, and is the daughter of area businessman Jim McIngvale and his wife Linda.

At one point, doctors believed McIngvale's OCD was too severe to be treated. Her rituals included having to repeat menial tasks 42 times, obsessions with religious symbolism, and washing her hands over a hundred times a day. She engaged in exposure with response prevention (ERP) treatment for her OCD and now successfully manages her illness.

She completed her bachelor's degree in 2009 and Master's in 2010 from Loyola University Chicago. She earned her PhD from the University of Houston's Graduate College of Social Work in 2014 and her MBA from the Kellogg school of business management at Northwestern University. She is an adjunct assistant professor at Baylor College of Medicine. McIngvale is the director of the OCD Institute of Texas, a specialized residential and intensive treatment center for OCD. McIngvale serves on multiple non-profit boards and is an advocate/speaker for mental illness on a national platform. McIngvale also founded and runs the OCD Challenge website which is a free self-help website for OCD.
