= Spring High School =

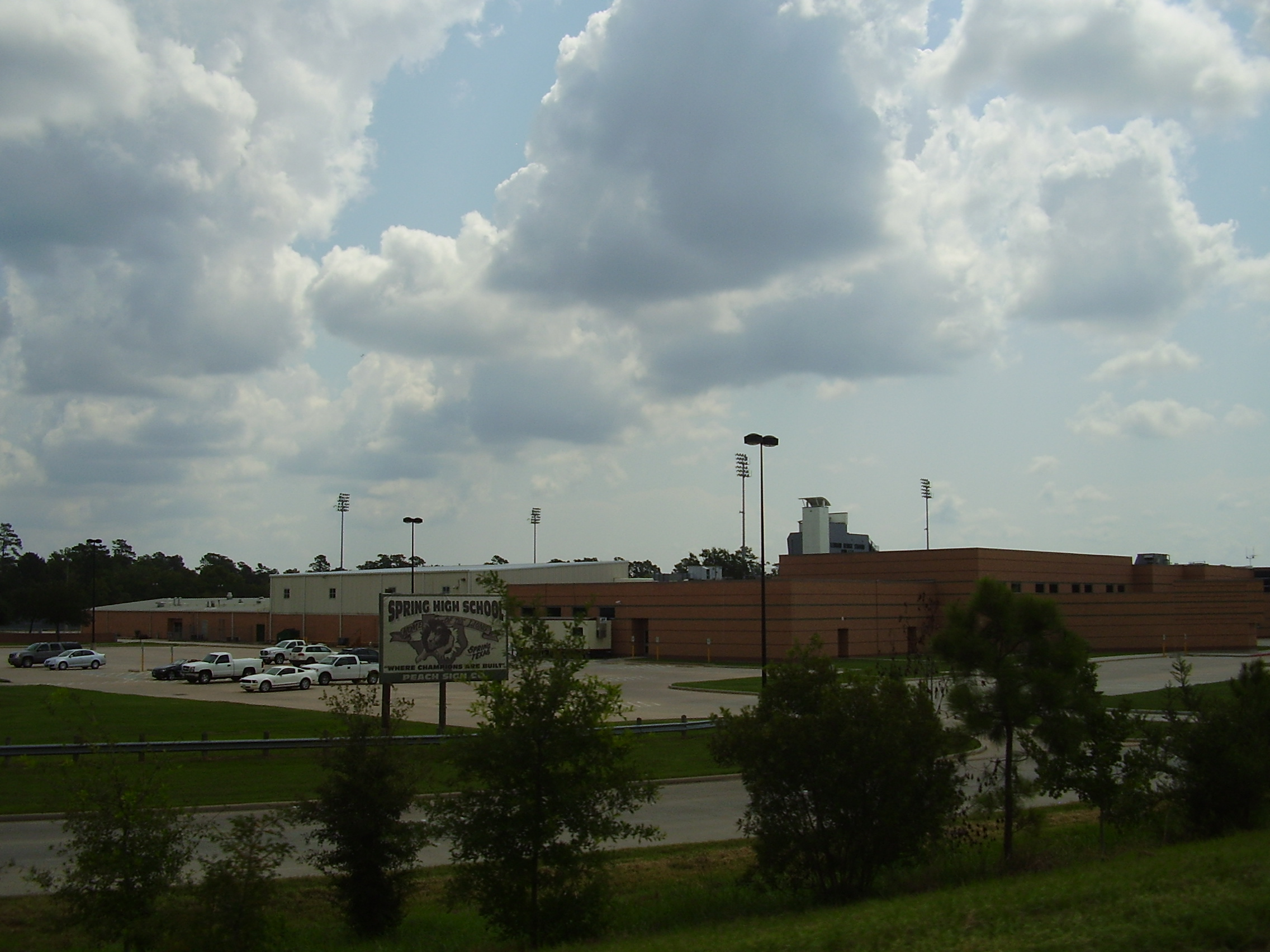
- The northwest side of the school.

Location
- 19428 Interstate 45 N Spring, Texas; United States; 30.05296°N 95.42986°W

Information
- Type: Public school
- Established: 1969
- School district: Spring Independent School District
- Principal: Alonzo Reynolds III
- Teaching staff: 129.20 (on an FTE basis)
- Enrollment: 2,594 (2024–2025)
- Student to teacher ratio: 20.08
- Colors: Green, black, and white
- Mascot: Lion
- Website: shs.springisd.org

Spring High School is a public high school located in the Spring census-designated place in unincorporated Harris County, Texas, United States.

Spring High School, which serves grades 9 through 12, is a part of the Spring Independent School District. Spring High School's mascot is the lion. School colors are black, green, and white. Oren Chappell was principal of the school in the early 1980s. Gloria Marshall was the principal of Spring High School from 1985 until June 2007. Dean Borg served as principal for the 2007-2008 school year and Donna Ullrich was named principal on July 3, 2008.. Diaka R. Carter was appointed as the new principal in 2016. As of the 2011–2012 school year, Spring High School is the largest campus in Spring ISD.

Spring High School was named a 1992–93 National Blue Ribbon School.

== History ==
Spring High School opened in 1969. Spring High was built along Interstate 45 from which passing drivers could see the school. In 1976 Spring High School South opened, taking ninth graders from Spring High School. In 1981 and 1982 Spring High South renamed itself Westfield High School and became its own four-year institution. In 2000 the Richard C. Crain Fine Arts Building opened on the property of Spring High School. It was named after Richard Crain, who directed band at Spring and Westfield and became the director of music.

=== 2013 stabbing incident ===
On September 4, 2013, a 17-year-old student was killed, and three other teen boys were injured during a stabbing attack at the school. Luis Alonzo Alfaro, was charged with murder. Luis admitted pulling a knife during the fight and stabbing four people.

=== 2020s ===
In February 2017 the district proposed redrawing the attendance boundaries of its high schools; this would take effect in the 2020-2021 school year. The district also plans to establish one ninth grade center for each comprehensive high school. According to the proposed 2020-2021 high school map, the eastern portion of the Spring census-designated place will be reassigned from Spring High School to Dekaney High School. The school district delayed the rezoning at least until after the 2021-2022 school year due to the COVID-19 pandemic in Texas, as it determines how the pandemic changed student enrollment patterns in Spring ISD.

== Campus ==
It is located along Interstate 45, about 20 miles (32 km) north of Downtown Houston. In the 1990s banners about the school's achievements were posted so commuters on I-45 could view them.

The original Spring High School campus was built in 1969. In 1996, the Spring ISD Board of Trustees agreed to a 3-year 20 million dollar renovation project that included additional buildings, a new cafeteria, a new baseball field, a softball field and two new gymnasiums. In 2000 the Richard C. Crain Fine Arts Building was built to accommodate the Spring Band, Spring Choir and the Lion Players Theatre Company. In 2009 the Spring High School Performing Arts Center was built after the renovation of the original auditorium.

In March 2024, Spring ISD purchased land for a new location for the high school, located about 3 miles (4.8 km) away from the current campus. In August 2025, construction broke ground and is intended to finish by Fall 2028. In February 2026, during construction, a citation was issued by the Harris County engineering office for illegal discharge flowing into the nearby Spring Creek from the site.

== Academics ==
For the 2024-2025 school year, Spring High School received an F grade from the Texas Education Agency, with an overall score of 55 out of 100. The school received an F grade in Student Achievement, a D in School Progress, and an F in Closing the Gaps.

== Student body ==
In 2013, the school had about 3,500 students, making it one of the larger high schools in Harris County. As of that year, 34% of Spring High School students were Hispanic, 32% were White, and 28% were Black. In 2003, the school had 2,750 students, with 68% being White, 18% Hispanic, and 12% Black.

For the 2025–2026 school year, there are 2,358 students. 45.3% are Hispanic, 42.7% are Black, 5.8% are White, 3.0% are Two or More Races, 1.4% are Asian, 1.0% are Native American, and 0.6% are Pacific Islander. 74.8% of students are economically disadvantaged.

== Notable alumni ==
- Brooke Adams (class of 2003) — professional wrestler for Total Nonstop Action wrestling
- Greg Baldwin (class of 1978) — actor and voice actor
- Josh Beckett (class of 1999) — MLB player, last played for the Los Angeles Dodgers
- Crystal Bernard (class of 1979) — actress and musician
- Robyn Bernard (class of 1977) — actress and musician
- Marqui Christian (class of 2012) — NFL player for the New York Jets
- Bishop Davenport (class of 2022) – college football quarterback for the South Alabama Jaguars
- Ben Gay (class of 1998) — NFL player, last played for the Indianapolis Colts
- Alaysha Johnson (class of 2014) — track athlete
- Xavier Jones (class of 2015) — NFL player for the Los Angeles Rams
- Bravvion Roy (class of 2016) — NFL player for the Carolina Panthers
- Kyle York (class of 2001) — former college football quarterback for the Mississippi State Bulldogs

== Feeder schools ==
The following middle schools feed into Spring High School:

- Bammel Middle School
- Rickey C. Bailey Middle School
- O.B. Dueitt Middle School
- Springwoods Village Middle School
- Twin Creeks Middle School
- Dr. Edward Roberson Middle School
- Edwin M Wells Middle School

The following elementary schools feed into Spring High School:

- George Anderson Elementary School
- Chet Burchett Elementary School
- Pearl M. Hirsch Elementary School
- Mildred Jenkins Elementary School
- Gloria Marshall Elementary School
- Ginger McNabb Elementary School
- Northgate Crossing Elementary School
- Salyers Elementary School
- Lewis Eugene Smith Elementary School
- John A. Winship Elementary School
- Clark Intermediate Elementary School
- Clark Primary Elementary School
