= Texas's 150th House of Representatives district =

American legislative district

Texas's 150th State House of Representatives district
Representative
| Valoree Swanson; R–Spring |
- Demographics: 43.3% White; 17.5% Black; 29.5% Hispanic; 8.5% Asian
- Population (2020) • Voting age: 195,678; 141,469

District 150 is a district in the Texas House of Representatives that encompasses part of Harris County. The district's first term started on January 11, 1983. The current representative of this District is Valoree Swanson who started serving on January 10, 2017.

In the 2026 Texas House of Representatives election, A'Yonna Kellum defeated Swanson. Kellum's victory marked a flip to the Democratic Party.

== Representatives ==
| Leg. | Name | party | Term start | Term end | Electoral history | Counties represented |
|---|---|---|---|---|---|---|
| 68th | Paul John Hilbert | Republican | January 11, 1983 | January 8, 1985 | Elected in 1982; Re-elected 9 more times from 1984 to 2000; Died in office | Harris |
| 69th | Paul John Hilbert | Republican | January 8, 1985 | January 13, 1987 | Elected in 1982; Re-elected 9 more times from 1984 to 2000; Died in office | Harris |
| 70th | Paul John Hilbert | Republican | January 13, 1987 | January 10, 1989 | Elected in 1982; Re-elected 9 more times from 1984 to 2000; Died in office | Harris |
| 71st | Paul John Hilbert | Republican | January 10, 1989 | January 8, 1991 | Elected in 1982; Re-elected 9 more times from 1984 to 2000; Died in office | Harris |
| 72nd | Paul John Hilbert | Republican | January 8, 1991 | January 12, 1993 | Elected in 1982; Re-elected 9 more times from 1984 to 2000; Died in office | Harris |
| 73rd | Paul John Hilbert | Republican | January 12, 1993 | January 10, 1995 | Elected in 1982; Re-elected 9 more times from 1984 to 2000; Died in office | Harris |
| 74th | Paul John Hilbert | Republican | January 10, 1995 | January 14, 1997 | Elected in 1982; Re-elected 9 more times from 1984 to 2000; Died in office | Harris |
| 75th | Paul John Hilbert | Republican | January 14, 1997 | January 12, 1999 | Elected in 1982; Re-elected 9 more times from 1984 to 2000; Died in office | Harris |
| 76th | Paul John Hilbert | Republican | January 12, 1999 | January 9, 2001 | Elected in 1982; Re-elected 9 more times from 1984 to 2000; Died in office | Harris |
| 77th | Paul John Hilbert | Republican | January 9, 2001 | October 28, 2001 | Elected in 1982; Re-elected 9 more times from 1984 to 2000; Died in office | Harris |
| 77th | Vacant | N/A | October 28, 2001 | April 8, 2002 | Seat was vacant until Debbie Riddle was sworn in after John Hilbert died in office | Harris |
| 77th | Debbie Riddle | Republican | April 8, 2002 | January 14, 2003 | First elected to finish Paul John Hilbert's term Elected in 2002; Re-elected 6 times from 2004 to 2014; Lost re-election in 2016 | Harris |
| 78th | Debbie Riddle | Republican | January 14, 2003 | January 11, 2005 | First elected to finish Paul John Hilbert's term Elected in 2002; Re-elected 6 times from 2004 to 2014; Lost re-election in 2016 | Harris |
| 79th | Debbie Riddle | Republican | January 11, 2005 | January 9, 2007 | First elected to finish Paul John Hilbert's term Elected in 2002; Re-elected 6 times from 2004 to 2014; Lost re-election in 2016 | Harris |
| 80th | Debbie Riddle | Republican | January 9, 2007 | January 13, 2009 | First elected to finish Paul John Hilbert's term Elected in 2002; Re-elected 6 times from 2004 to 2014; Lost re-election in 2016 | Harris |
| 81st | Debbie Riddle | Republican | January 13, 2009 | January 11, 2011 | First elected to finish Paul John Hilbert's term Elected in 2002; Re-elected 6 times from 2004 to 2014; Lost re-election in 2016 | Harris |
| 82nd | Debbie Riddle | Republican | January 11, 2011 | January 8, 2013 | First elected to finish Paul John Hilbert's term Elected in 2002; Re-elected 6 times from 2004 to 2014; Lost re-election in 2016 | Harris |
| 83rd | Debbie Riddle | Republican | January 8, 2013 | January 13, 2015 | First elected to finish Paul John Hilbert's term Elected in 2002; Re-elected 6 times from 2004 to 2014; Lost re-election in 2016 | Harris |
| 84th | Debbie Riddle | Republican | January 13, 2015 | January 10, 2017 | First elected to finish Paul John Hilbert's term Elected in 2002; Re-elected 6 times from 2004 to 2014; Lost re-election in 2016 | Harris |
| 85th | Valoree Swanson | Republican | January 10, 2017 | January 8, 2019 | Elected in 2016; Won the Republican Primary | Harris |
| 86th | Valoree Swanson | Republican | January 8, 2019 | January 12, 2021 | Re-elected in 2018 | Harris |
| 87th | Valoree Swanson | Republican | January 12, 2021 | January 2023 | Re-elected in 2020 | Harris |
| 88th | Valoree Swanson | Republican | Republican | January 2023 | January 2025 | Harris |
| 89th | Valoree Swanson | Republican | Republican | January 2025 | January 2027 | Harris |
| 90th | A'Yonna Kellum | Democratic | January 2027 | January 2029 | | Harris |
