= Jim McIngvale =

American businessman

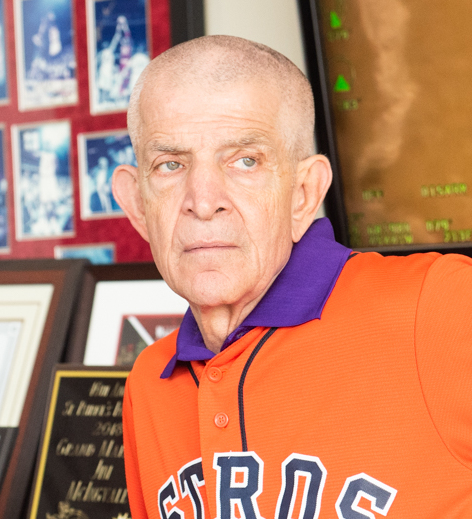
- McIngvale in 2018
- Born: James Franklin McIngvale; February 11, 1951 (age 75); Starkville, Mississippi, U.S.
- Other name: "Mattress Mack"
- Education: University of Texas at Austin; North Texas State University
- Occupation: Businessman
- Known for: Gallery Furniture and placing large bets on sports teams in Texas
- Spouse(s): Cynthia Potter (m. 1975; div. 1978) Linda McCullough (m. 1981)
- Children: 4, including Elizabeth
- Website: GalleryFurniture.com

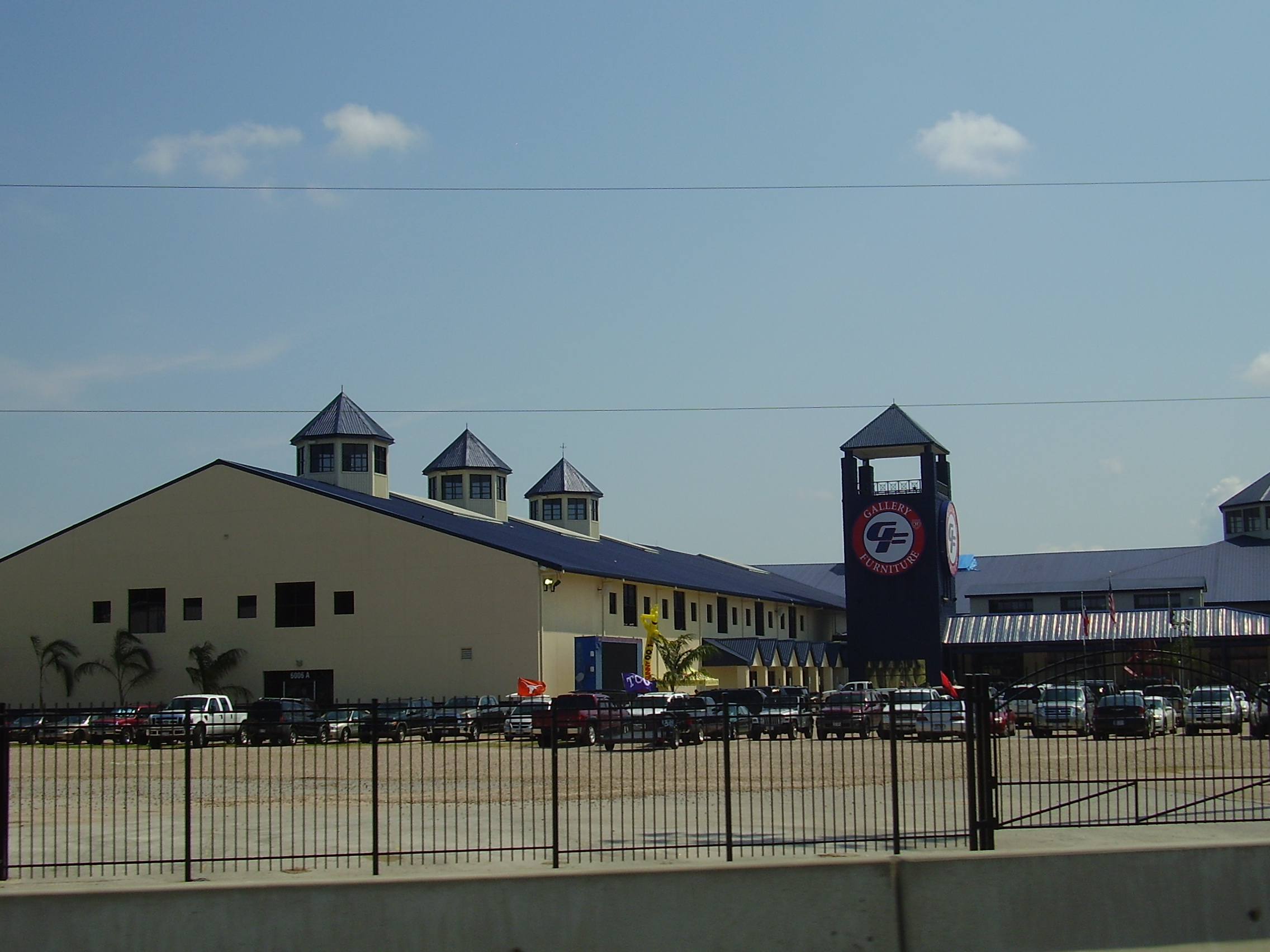
The main Gallery Furniture store in the Northside

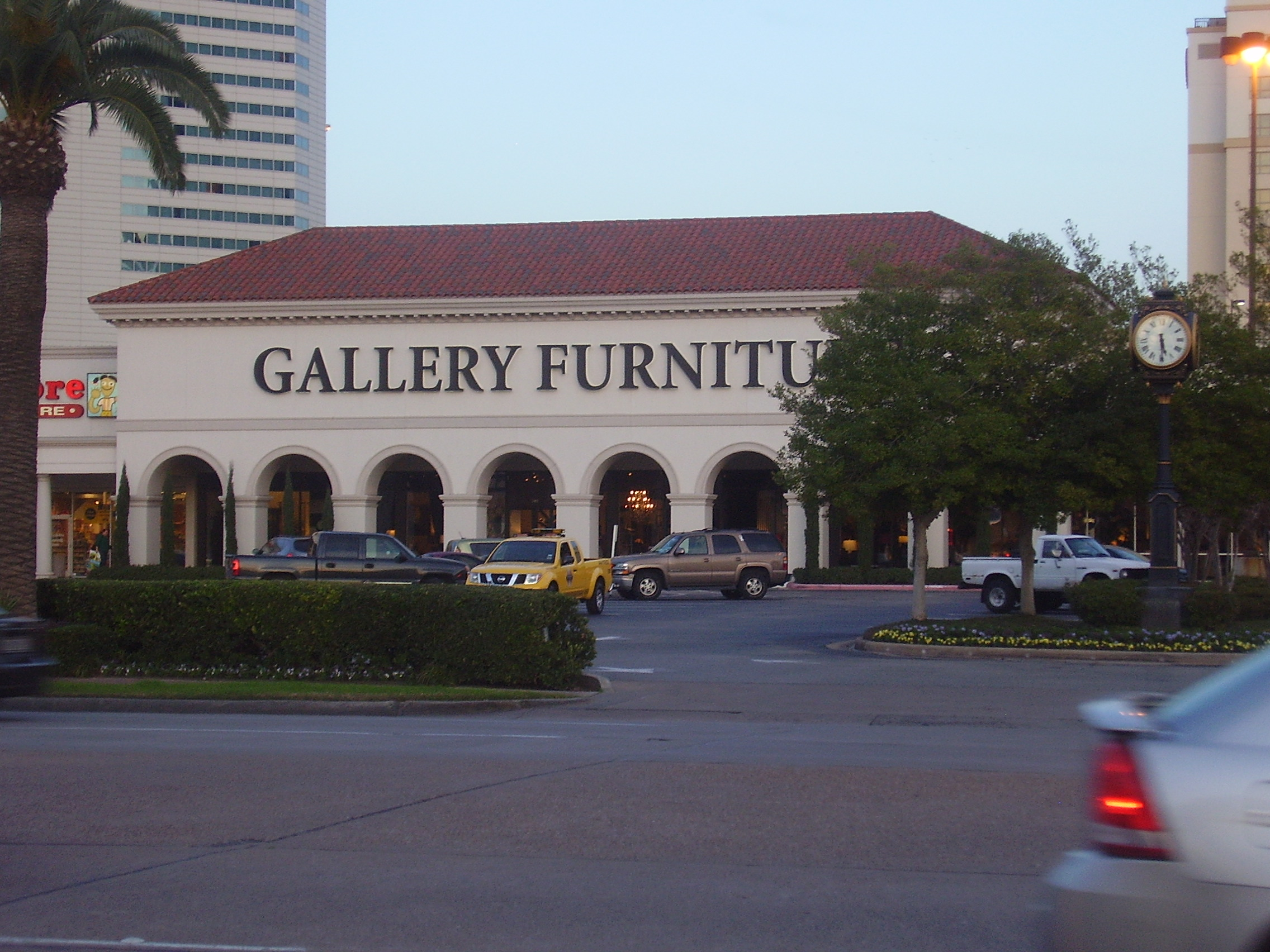
Gallery Furniture store in Uptown

James Franklin McIngvale (born February 11, 1951), also known as "Mattress Mack", is an American businessman. He is known for owning and operating the Gallery Furniture retail chain, based in Houston, Texas.

== Early life and education ==
McIngvale was born on February 11, 1951, in Starkville, Mississippi. He graduated from Bishop Lynch High School in Dallas, attended the University of Texas at Austin, and later attended North Texas State University, now University of North Texas, in Denton where he played football at both.

== Business career ==
McIngvale is best known for his energetic, fast-paced sales pitches, typically ending with some variant of his catchphrase "saves you money!" His distinctive sales style originated from an incident that occurred early on in Gallery Furniture's history. Faced with financial difficulties, McIngvale invested all his remaining money, approximately $10,000, in a television commercial to be aired on two Houston stations. While watching the commercial being produced, he became dissatisfied and ad-libbed a sales pitch, speaking rapidly because of the limited amount of time available. The commercial proved very effective, and his sales increased dramatically afterward. In 1999, McIngvale spoke to the British Deming Association annual conference about the influence of W. Edwards Deming on his business methods.

McIngvale co-authored the book Always Think Big with Thomas Duening and John Ivancevich, which was published in 2002, and chronicles the ups and downs of his entrepreneurial career.

In May 2009, the Houston Chronicle reported that McIngvale refused to pay $48,000 in taxes to the Greater Northside Management District that were assessed from 2005 to 2007. He did, however, pay taxes to the district in 2008. His Northside facility is within the district's boundary. McIngvale said the management district does not do enough to maintain the area; he described the management district's taxation policies as "taxation without representation." The district sued McIngvale to try to force him to pay the taxes, and McIngvale said he was willing to dispute the charges in court.

== Philanthropic efforts ==
In August 2017, McIngvale opened his stores to people affected by Hurricane Harvey, which had flooded the city. When Tropical Storm Imelda flooded Houston in 2019, McIngvale once again opened the doors of Gallery Furniture and partnered with Crisis Clean-Up to provide free meals and shelter at the North Freeway location.

During the 2021 Texas power crisis and winter storms, McIngvale allowed people to shelter from the cold and spend the night at Gallery Furniture. Also in 2021, in the wake of evacuation and destruction due to Hurricane Ida, McIngvale sheltered displaced Louisianan residents at Gallery Furniture and provided warm meals and amenities for free. He also organized a supply donation drive and caravan into south Louisiana to deliver supplies to the area. In 2024, he did it again after Hurricane Beryl struck Houston, opening up his business for people to use air conditioning and charge their phones; by July 9, 3,000 people had been fed by McIngvale.

== Political donations and positions ==
McIngvale has primarily donated to Republican candidates for office, including Donald Trump, Ted Cruz, Lauren Boebert and Madison Cawthorn.

In 2010, McIngvale supported the Tea Party movement. He funded full-page ads for the Tea Party that appeared in the Houston Chronicle. He was a guest speaker along with many local conservative radio hosts for The North Houston Tea Party Patriots at Sam Houston Race Park.

During the 2015 Houston mayor's race, McIngvale endorsed conservative candidate Bill King over Sylvester Turner. Turner won the election.

In 2018, McIngvale endorsed the reelection of Republican U.S. Representative John Culberson and appeared in commercials supporting the congressman. Culberson lost the election to Lizzie Fletcher. In February 2020, after endorsing Bill King for mayor in 2015, McIngvale endorsed the reelection of Turner. During the 2022 Texas Attorney General election, McIngvale backed unsuccessful challenger George P. Bush against incumbent Ken Paxton.

Governor Greg Abbott named McIngvale to the Strike Force to Open Texas, a group "tasked with finding safe and effective ways to slowly reopen the state" amid the COVID-19 pandemic in April 2020.

After Joe Biden was declared the winner of the 2020 presidential election, McIngvale did not issue payouts to customers who correctly predicted that Biden would win. Speculation emerged that McIngvale had concerns about voter fraud in the 2020 election. However, in January 2021, two months after the election, McIngvale sent out checks to those who predicted Biden would win. He said the delay was due to the fact he believed the results of the election could change, but conceded those odds were always "very small."

McIngvale paid for the funeral of Jocelyn Nungaray in 2024, stating that "if [the killers] wouldn't have been here, she would still be alive," in reference to the alleged murderers being illegal immigrants. He also criticized Harris County prosecutors in comparison to neighboring Montgomery County, which he believes is tougher on criminals.

== Personal life ==
McIngvale married Olympic diver Cynthia Potter in 1975. Their marriage lasted three years before McIngvale filed for divorce, citing "conflict of personalities". He remarried to Linda McCullough in 1981. They have four children. He lives in the Northgate Forest community in an unincorporated area of Harris County, Texas. Ericka Mellon of the Houston Chronicle said that he was "one of Northgate's most recognizable residents."

In 1992, McIngvale and his wife were executive producers of the action-comedy film Sidekicks starring Chuck Norris and Jonathan Brandis; in return, Norris did several television advertising commercials for Gallery Furniture, owned by Jim and Linda. In June 2019, McIngvale suffered a possible transient ischemic attack.

During the 2022 World Series, McIngvale attended Game 3 at Citizens Bank Park in Philadelphia. Phillies fans brought up the Astros sign stealing scandal and accusations of their second baseman Jose Altuve cheating. McIngvale responded by repeatedly yelling "fuck you" at the fans. After the incident, McIngvale referred to Philadelphia sports fans as the "worst fans ever."

=== Sports gambling ===
On February 3, 2022, McIngvale placed an unsuccessful $4.5 million wager on the Cincinnati Bengals to win Super Bowl LVI. It officially set the record for the largest mobile wager in sports betting history.

As a result of the Houston Astros winning the 2022 World Series championship, Mack was awarded $75 million in total sports betting payouts, the highest total in sports betting history.

McIngvale has lost $9.2 million betting on two CFP National Championship games. In 2022, he bet $6.2 million on the Alabama Crimson Tide to defeat the Georgia Bulldogs; Georgia won, 33–18. A year later, he once again bet against the Bulldogs, putting $3 million on the TCU Horned Frogs to pull an upset. Georgia instead won a second straight championship, 65–7, to date the biggest blowout ever in an FBS bowl game.
