= Westfield High School (Harris County, Texas) =

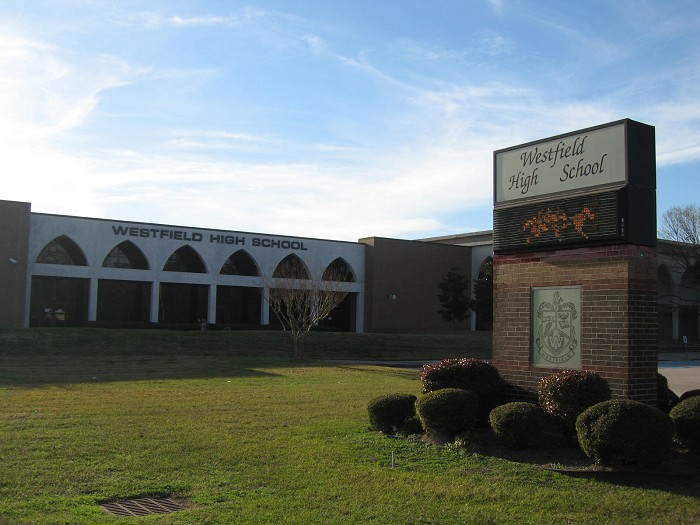

Location
- 16713 Ella Blvd; Houston, Texas 77090; United States; 30°00′26″N 95°26′48″W

Information
- Type: Public school
- Established: 1981
- School district: Spring Independent School District
- Superintendent: Lupita Hinojosa
- Principal: Laura Hunter
- Faculty: 112.19 (on an FTE basis)
- Grades: 9–12
- Enrollment: 2,264 (2024–2025)
- Student to teacher ratio: 20.18
- Colors: Red, white, and black
- Mascot: Mustang
- Nickname: Mustangs
- Website: whs.springisd.org

Westfield High School is a high school located in unincorporated Harris County, Texas, United States, near Houston.

The school, which serves grades 9-12, is a part of the Spring Independent School District. The school, in the Westfield community, has a Houston, Texas postal address. At one time it also served Remington Ranch.

== History ==
In 1976, Spring High School 9th and 10th grade students were moved into a separate campus known as Spring High School – South. In 1981, the campus was converted into a four-year high school known as Westfield High School.

In 2004, the district moved Westfield 9th grade students to a separate building. In 2009, Westfield 9th grade students were moved back into the main campus. In February 2017 the district proposed redrawing the attendance boundaries of its high schools; this would take effect in the 2020-2021 school year. The district also plans to establish one ninth grade center for each comprehensive high school.

== Academics ==
For the 2023–2024 school year, 65% of students were scored as "approaches grade level or above" on the state's standardized tests, 26% scored as "meets grade level or above," and 4% scored as "masters grade level."

== Demographics ==
The demographic breakdown of the 2,264 students enrolled for 2024–2025 was:

- Male - 1,207
- Female - 1,057
- Native American/Alaska Native - 23
- Asian - 54
- Black - 872
- Hispanic - 1,219
- White - 45
- Native Hawaiian/Pacific Islander - 4
- Two or More Races - 47

2,065 students were eligible for free or reduced-price lunch.

== Attendance boundaries ==
School attendance within Spring Independent School District is determined by attendance boundaries. The district has different attendance boundary maps for each level: elementary, middle, and high school. Westfield High School's attendance boundary covers the southwestern area of the district.

== Notable people and alumni ==
- Ryan Bingham — singer-songwriter/actor
- Tyrie Cleveland — NFL wide receiver
- Vaughn Eshelman — MLB pitcher
- Chad Fox — MLB pitcher
- Brad Halsey — MLB pitcher
- A.J. Holmes Jr. — college football defensive tackle
- Cordel Iwuagwu — NFL player
- Wes Iwundu — NBA player
- Lee Mays — NFL player
- Danny McCray — NFL player
- Ed Oliver — NFL defensive tackle
- Justin Outten — former assistant football head coach
- Kelly Rowland — singer-songwriter
- Mike Sirotka — MLB pitcher
- Takia Starks — professional basketball player
- Tony Ugoh — NFL offensive lineman
- Cardell Williams – college football quarterback for the Maryland Terrapins
- Steve Wisniewski — NFL offensive guard
- Kim Zmeskal — gymnast
