= Spring, Texas =

Census-designated place in Texas, U.S.

- Census-designated place
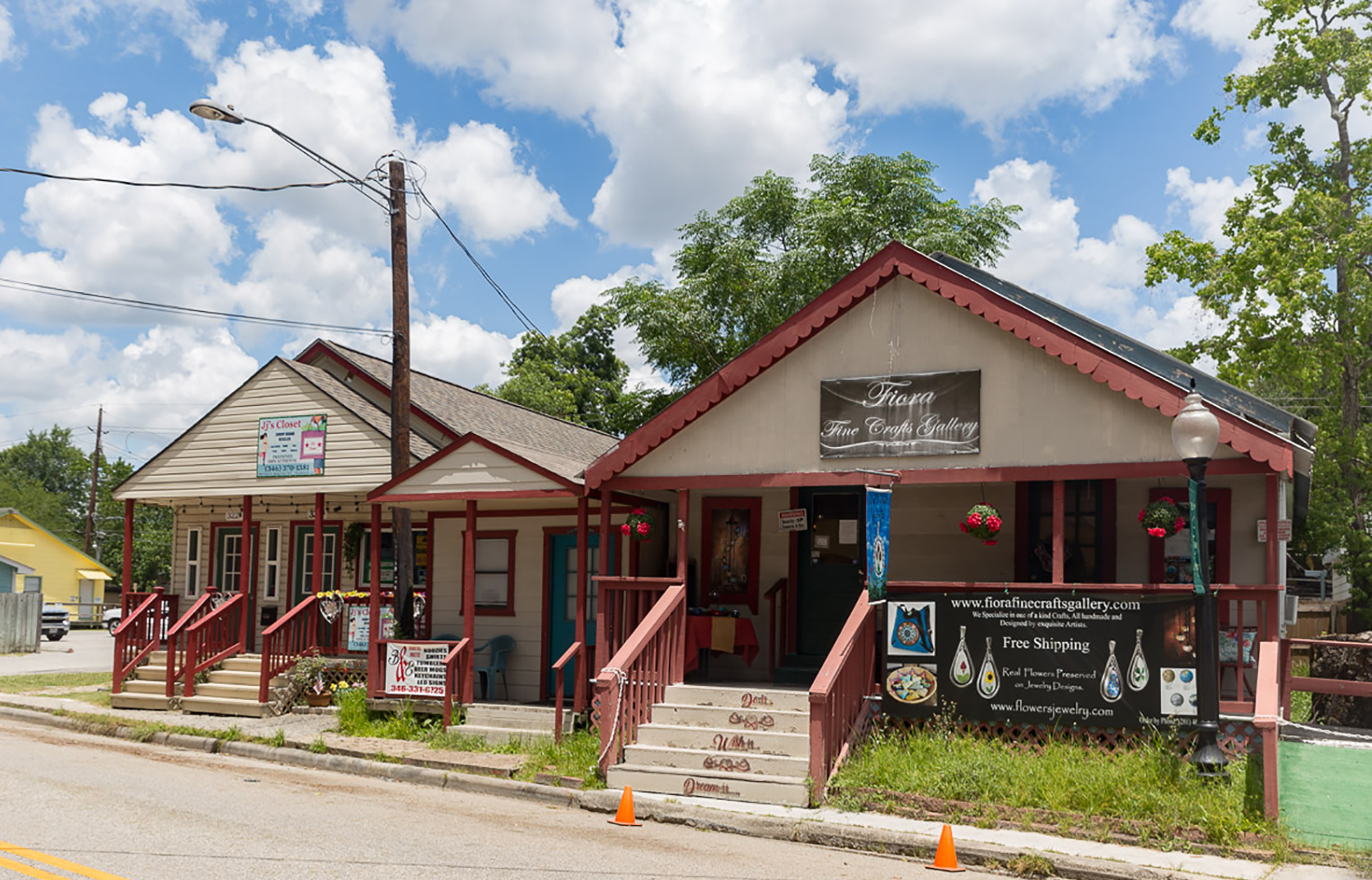
- Old Town Spring
- Interactive map of Spring, Texas
- Location within Texas Location within the United States
- Coordinates: 30°3′15″N 95°23′13″W
- Country: United States
- State: Texas
- County: Harris

Area
  - Total: 23.6 sq mi (61.0 km^{2})
  - Land: 23.2 sq mi (60.1 km^{2})
  - Water: 0.35 sq mi (0.9 km^{2})
- Elevation: 121 ft (37 m)

Population (2020)
  - Total: 62,559
  - Density: 2,700/sq mi (1,040/km^{2})
- Time zone: UTC-6 (Central (CST))
  - Summer (DST): UTC-5 (CDT)
- ZIP codes: 77373
- Area codes: 281, 346, 621, 713, 832
- FIPS code: 48-69596
- GNIS feature ID: 1347681

Spring is a census-designated place (CDP) in Harris County, Texas, United States. It lies within the extraterritorial jurisdiction of Houston and is part of the Greater Houston metropolitan area. The population was 62,559 at the 2020 census. While the name "Spring" is popularly applied to a large area of northern Harris County and a smaller area of southern Montgomery County, the original town of Spring, now known as Old Town Spring, is at the intersection of Spring-Cypress and Hardy roads and encompasses perhaps 1 square kilometer (0.39 sq mi).

== History ==
The large geographic area now known as Spring was originally inhabited by the Orcoquiza Native Americans. In 1836, the Texas General Council of the Provisional Government placed what is now the town of Spring in the Harrisburg municipality. In 1838, William Pierpont placed a trading post on Spring Creek. In 1840, the town of Spring had 153 residents. By the mid-1840s, many German immigrants, including Gus Bayer and Carl Wunsche, moved to the area and began farming. People from Louisiana and other parts of the post-Civil War southern U.S. settled in Spring. The main cash crops in Spring were sugar cane and cotton; residents also grew vegetables.

The International and Great Northern Railroad, built through Spring, opened in 1871 and caused Spring to expand. In 1873, Spring received a post office. By 1884, Spring had 150 residents, two steam saw and grist mills, two cotton gins, three churches, and several schools. In 1901–1903, the International-Great Northern Railroad opened, connecting Spring to Fort Worth. Spring, now with a roundhouse, became a switchyard with 200 rail workers and 14 track yards. The population increased to 1,200 by 1910. After the roundhouse relocated to Houston in 1923, Spring's population declined; by 1931, it was 300. The Spring State Bank opened in 1912. It was robbed several times in the 1930s; there was a false rumor that one of the robberies was committed by Bonnie and Clyde. The bank consolidated with Tomball Bank in 1935.

By 1947, Spring had 700 residents. In the 1970s, Houston's suburbs began to expand northward, and more subdivisions and residential areas opened in the Spring area. Some older houses in the town of Spring were restored and housed shops. The Old Town Spring Association opened in 1980 to promote the Old Town Spring shopping area, which consists of the restored houses. In 1984, the Spring area had 15,000 residents. By 1989, Old Town Spring became a tourist area. In 1990, the Spring area had 33,111 residents.

From 1969 to 1992, the Goodyear airship America was based in Spring from its large hangar visible just off Interstate 45. Takeoffs and landings were a major attraction and motorists continually pulled off to the interstate's shoulders to watch. In 1992 the America was moved to Akron, Ohio, and the massive hangar was eventually torn down. As of 2020, the hangar's concrete foundation is still visible at the intersection of Holzwarth Road and Meadow Edge Lane west of Lowe's Home Improvement Center.

The 1992 Log Cabin Republicans convention was held in Spring.

== Geography ==
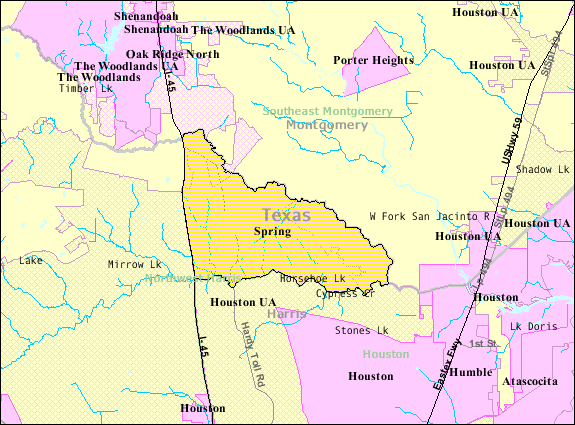
Map of Spring CDP (as of 2000)

Spring is located at 30°3′15″N 95°23′13″W (30.054127, −95.386991).

According to the United States Census Bureau, the CDP has an area of 23.6 square miles (61.0 km^{2}), of which 23.2 square miles (60.1 km^{2}) is land and 0.35 square miles (0.9 km^{2}), or 1.51%, is water.

=== Climate ===
Spring's climate is characterized by hot, stifling, humid summers and generally mild to cool winters. According to the Köppen Climate Classification system, Spring has a humid subtropical climate, abbreviated "Cfa" on climate maps.

== Demographics ==
Historical population
Census	Pop.	Note	%±
1990	33,111		—
2000	36,385		9.9%
2010	54,298		49.2%
2020	62,559		15.2%
U.S. Decennial Census; 1850–1900 1910; 1920 1930 1940; 1950 1960 1970; 1980 1990 2000; 2010 2020

Spring first appeared as a census designated place in the 1990 U.S. census.

=== Racial and ethnic composition ===
Spring CDP, Texas – Racial and ethnic composition Note: the US Census treats Hispanic/Latino as an ethnic category. This table excludes Latinos from the racial categories and assigns them to a separate category. Hispanics/Latinos may be of any race.
Race / Ethnicity (NH = Non-Hispanic)	Pop 2000	Pop 2010	Pop 2020	% 2000	% 2010	% 2020
White alone (NH)	26,808	25,477	18,408	73.68%	46.92%	29.43%
Black or African American alone (NH)	2,500	10,293	15,492	6.87%	18.96%	24.76%
Native American or Alaska Native alone (NH)	158	157	134	0.43%	0.29%	0.21%
Asian alone (NH)	503	1,671	1,967	1.38%	3.08%	3.14%
Native Hawaiian or Pacific Islander alone (NH)	40	178	228	0.11%	0.33%	0.36%
Other race alone (NH)	44	146	368	0.12%	0.27%	0.59%
Mixed race or Multiracial (NH)	488	931	2,258	1.34%	1.71%	3.61%
Hispanic or Latino (any race)	5,844	15,445	23,704	16.06%	28.44%	37.89%
Total	36,385	54,298	62,559	100.00%	100.00%	100.00%

=== 2020 census ===
As of the 2020 census, Spring had a population of 62,559. The median age was 34.4 years. 26.8% of residents were under the age of 18 and 10.6% were 65 years of age or older. For every 100 females there were 94.1 males, and for every 100 females age 18 and over there were 91.0 males age 18 and over.

99.4% of residents lived in urban areas, while 0.6% lived in rural areas.

There were 20,861 households and 15,092 families in Spring; 40.7% had children under the age of 18 living in them. Of all households, 50.3% were married-couple households, 16.0% were households with a male householder and no spouse or partner present, and 26.2% were households with a female householder and no spouse or partner present. About 19.1% of all households were made up of individuals and 6.1% had someone living alone who was 65 years of age or older.

There were 21,897 housing units, of which 4.7% were vacant. The homeowner vacancy rate was 1.5% and the rental vacancy rate was 7.4%.

Racial composition as of the 2020 census
Race	Number	Percent
White	23,440	37.5%
Black or African American	15,847	25.3%
American Indian and Alaska Native	828	1.3%
Asian	2,037	3.3%
Native Hawaiian and Other Pacific Islander	258	0.4%
Some other race	9,788	15.6%
Two or more races	10,361	16.6%
Hispanic or Latino (of any race)	23,704	37.9%

=== 2010 census ===
As of the census of 2010, there were 54,298 people, 18,050 households, and 14,068 families residing in the CDP. The population density was 2,300.8 inhabitants per square mile (888.3/km^{2}). There were 19,191 housing units at an average density of 813.2 per square mile (314.0/km^{2}).

In 2010, the racial makeup of the CDP was 63.8% White, 19.5% African American, 0.6% Native American, 3.1% Asian, 0.4% Pacific Islander, 9.3% from other races, and 3.3% from two or more races. Hispanic or Latino people of any race were 28.4% of the population.

=== 2000 census ===
In 2000, the racial makeup of the CDP was 83.01% White, 6.99% African American, 0.51% Native American, 1.42% Asian, 0.13% Pacific Islander, 5.62% from other races, and 2.31% from two or more races. Hispanic or Latino residents of any race were 16.06% of the population.

In 2000, there were 12,302 households, out of which 46.2% had children under the age of 18 living with them, 62.9% were married couples living together, 12.6% had a female householder with no husband present, and 20.1% were non-families. 15.4% of all households were made up of individuals, and 2.8% had someone living alone who was 65 years of age or older. The average household size was 2.96 and the average family size was 3.30.

In the CDP, 31.0% of the population was under the age of 18, 8.7% was from 18 to 24, 33.8% from 25 to 44, 22.0% from 45 to 64, and 4.5% was 65 years of age or older. The median age was 32 years. For every 100 females, there were 95.0 males. For every 100 females age 18 and over, there were 91.4 males.

The median income for a household in the CDP was $56,662, and the median income for a family was $60,934 as of 2000. Males had a median income of $42,134 versus $30,270 for females. The per capita income for the CDP was $21,027. About 3.1% of families and 4.1% of the population were below the poverty line, including 4.7% of those under age 18 and 4.5% of those age 65 or over.

== Government and infrastructure ==
=== Local government ===
The Spring Fire Department serves areas within the Spring CDP and some areas outside it with Spring addresses. The fire department is headquartered at 656 E. Louetta, in the middle of the CDP. Stations within the Spring CDP include Station 71 at 646 E. Louetta, Station 73 at 4923 Treaschwig Road, Station 74 at 24030 Old Aldine-Westfield, and Station 78 at 1225 Booker Road. Station 77 at 2900 Cypresswood is adjacent to the Spring CDP, on the other side of Interstate 45. The North Harris County Regional Water Authority provides water services to the Spring CDP, which is in Voting District No. 5. The Texas House of Representatives bill that created the water authority, HB 2965, was signed into law on June 18, 1999. On January 15, 2000, voters affirmed the creation of the authority in a special election.

Harris County Housing Authority (HCHA) operates Louetta Village, a public housing complex for seniors near the Spring CDP, with a Spring postal address. It has 116 units.

=== County representation ===
Spring is in Harris County Precinct 3. It was in Precinct 4 until a redistricting plan was approved in October 2021. As of 2022 Tom Ramsey heads the precinct. The CDP is served by Harris County Sheriff's Office District II Patrol, headquartered in the Humble Substation at 7900 Will Clayton Parkway in Humble. Areas west of Interstate 45 that have Spring addresses and are outside the CDP are served by Harris County Sheriff's Office District I Patrol, headquartered in the Cypresswood Substation at 6831 Cypresswood Drive. The office formerly operated the Old Town Spring Storefront, which was in Old Town Spring.

Harris County Precinct 4 operates a recycling center at Jesse H. Jones Park, southeast of the Spring CDP. Montgomery County operates the Precinct 3 Recycling Center at 1122 Pruitt Road in an unincorporated area of Montgomery County, north of the Spring CDP.

The Harris Health System (formerly Harris County Hospital District) designated the E. A. "Squatty" Lyons Health Center in Humble for the ZIP code 77373. The designated public hospital is Lyndon B. Johnson Hospital in northeast Houston.

=== State and federal representation ===
Spring is in District 150 of the Texas House of Representatives. As of November 2024 Valoree Swanson represents the district. It is in District 4 of the Texas Senate; as of 2023, Brandon Creighton represents the district in the Texas Senate.

Spring is in Texas's 2nd congressional district; as of November 2024 Dan Crenshaw is the representative.

Spring's designated United States Postal Service post office is the Spring Post Office at 1411 Wunsche Loop. The post office serves around 80,000 people.

== Economy ==
In January 2010 the Houston Business Journal reported that real estate officials said that ExxonMobil planned to build a corporate campus in unincorporated Harris County along Interstate 45, adjacent to the Spring CDP. According to the article, ExxonMobil plans to consolidate thousands of employees from Houston and Fairfax County, Virginia, into the facility; employees from over two dozen locations in Greater Houston are also expected to be consolidated into it. The 9,000-employee campus opened in 2014 and became ExxonMobil's new headquarters in 2023, after moving from its campus in Irving, Texas. In 2026 the company also moved it's legal headquarters from New Jersey to Texas citing a business friendly environment.

In December 2020 Hewlett Packard Enterprise announced it was relocating it's headquarters from San Jose, California to Spring Texas, which opened in April 2022.

== Education ==
=== Primary and secondary schools ===
==== Public schools ====
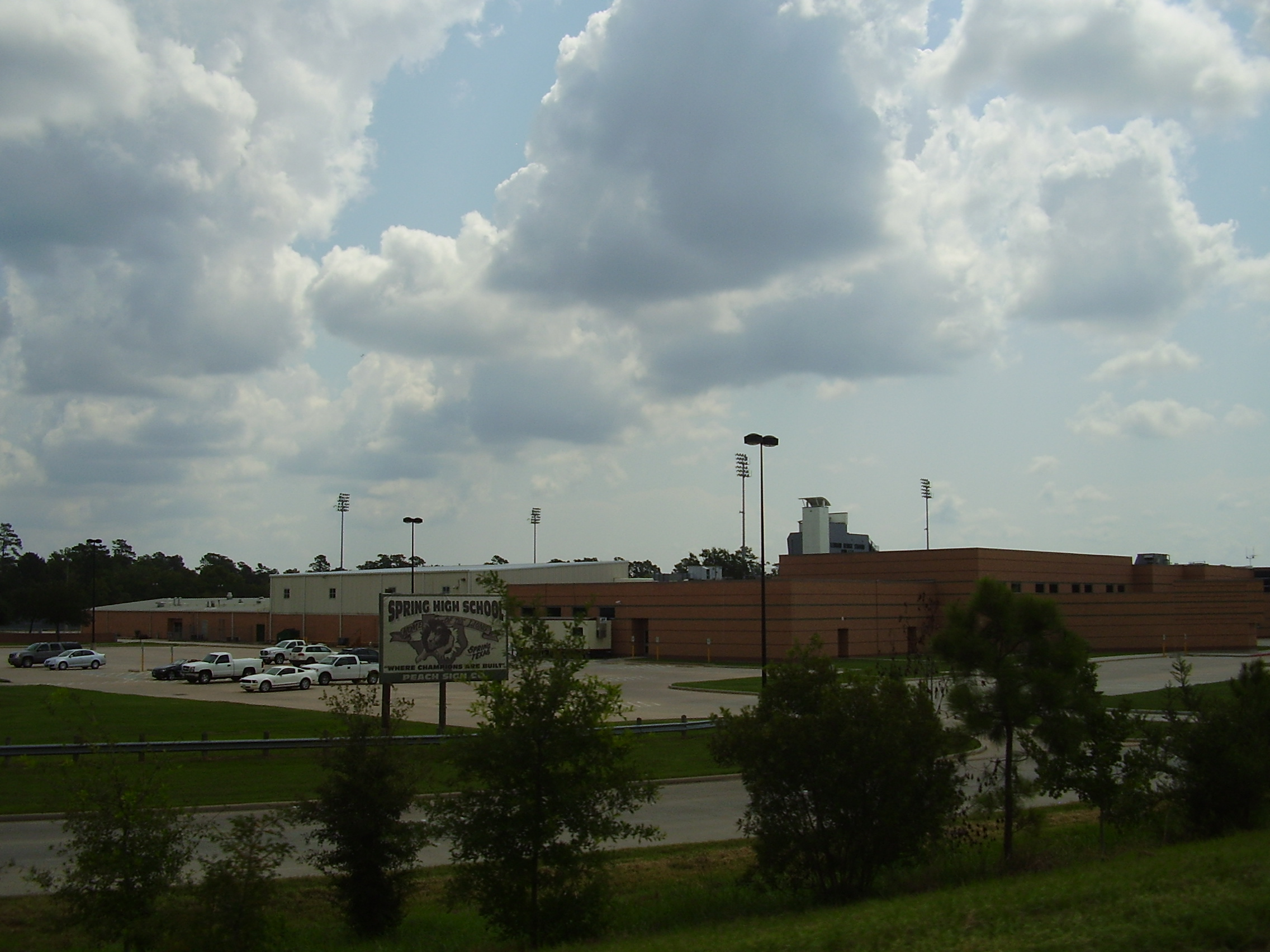
Spring High School

The Spring CDP is in the Spring Independent School District. Several elementary schools, George E. Anderson, Chet Burchett, Pearl M. Hirsch, Mildred I. Jenkins, Ginger McNabb, Northgate Crossing, Salyers, Lewis Eugene Smith, and John A. Winship, are in the CDP and serve sections of the CDP. Marshall Elementary School was scheduled to open in 2010.

Four middle schools, Bailey, Dueitt, Springwoods Village, and Twin Creeks, are in the CDP and serve sections of the CDP. All residents are zoned to Spring High School. Carl Wunsche Sr. High School is in the Spring CDP. In February 2017 the district proposed redrawing the attendance boundaries of its high schools; this would take effect in the 2020–21 school year. According to the proposed 2020–21 high school map, the eastern portion of the Spring CDP will be reassigned from Spring High School to Dekaney High School. Due to the impact of the COVID-19 pandemic in Texas, the district delayed the high school boundary changes until at least 2022–23.

Harris County residents with Spring addresses that are not in the CDP attend schools in either Spring ISD or Klein Independent School District. Montgomery County residents with Spring addresses attend schools in Conroe Independent School District. Areas in Klein ISD with Spring addresses are served by Klein Oak High School, Klein High School, Klein Cain High School, and Klein Collins High School. Areas in Conroe ISD with Spring addresses are served by Oak Ridge High School and Grand Oaks High School on the eastern side, and both The Woodlands High School and The Woodlands College Park High School on the western side.

Sam Houston State University operates a charter elementary school in the CDP.

===== History of public schools =====
Originally Spring was served by the Spring Common School District. In 1935 that district and the Harrell Common School District merged, forming the Spring Independent School District. The Southwell School, the segregated African-American school, served Spring from the early 1900s until 1945. In 1932 the Wunsche family donated land to the Spring school district, and the Carl Wunsche School, serving middle and high school, opened. In 1947 an addition opened and elementary school students began to be served by Wunsche. Salyers, opened in 1959 as Spring Elementary School, was Spring ISD's first dedicated elementary school. After Salyers opened, elementary school classes were removed from Wunsche School. Spring High School opened in 1969, taking high school students from Wunsche. As a result, Wunsche became SISD's first dedicated middle school.

Winship Elementary School's classes began in 1972; the Winship campus opened on December 15 of that year. Jenkins opened on February 6, 1977. Hirsch opened in 1978. Anderson opened in 1979. Dueitt opened in 1980. Wunsche closed as a regular middle school in 1983, and was retrofitted to become a multipurpose school. Twin Creeks, which took Wumsche's middle school population, opened in 1984. Smith opened in 1986. Anderson was named a 1989–90 National Blue Ribbon School. Burchett opened in August 2005. Bailey opened in August 2006 and was dedicated on October 15 of that year. By 2015, Spring ISD planned to have built a new elementary school and High School #4 within the Spring CDP. Middle School #8 (Springwoods Village) is scheduled to open in fall 2020.

==== Private schools ====
Langtry Preparatory Academy, a private school, is in the Spring CDP.

Area private schools:

- Frassati Catholic High School
- Founders Christian School
- Houston Peace Academy, of the Islamic Education Institute of Texas of the Islamic Society of Greater Houston - At Masjid Al-Salam (Champions Islamic Center)
- Elements Montessori Preschool
- St. Edward Catholic School

In addition, St. Thomas High School, an all-boys' high school in central Houston, has a bus service to and from St. Edward Catholic School. In 2013 Saint John XXIII High School, in Greater Katy, also served the Spring area; Frassati opened in 2013 with the 9th grade and did not immediately serve all grade levels.

===== Northwoods Catholic School =====
Northwoods Catholic School, a private Catholic school in the Spring area, was off the intersection of Farm to Market Road 2920 and Gosling Road, in a 51-acre (21 ha) campus. It used a curriculum from the Legionaries of Christ. Established c. 1999, it was not affiliated with the Archdiocese of Galveston-Houston. It initially had 13 students, and was in a facility in the Ponderosa Forest neighborhood, an apartment clubhouse temporarily used as a school.

In 2003 it had 200 students. By that year its permanent facility opened; it had a price tag of $6 million. In 2004 it had 250 students. In 2005 academic dean Susan Horne became the principal, and the previous principal, Joe Noonan, became Northwood's executive director. In 2010 it had about 230 students, with about 40% of them originating from The Woodlands. The building's first floor had 44,000 square feet (4,100 m^{2}) of space. Its 22,000-square-foot (2,000 m^{2}) second floor, with offices, computer and science labs, and a library, was blessed on August 13, 2010, and opened on August 18. It was built in three months.

In the 2015–16 school year, the school's final year of operation, it had 268 students; it was projected to have 160 for the following year. The school announced on May 4, 2016, that it was closing because of a shrinking budget and declining enrollment. It closed on June 30, 2016. An area developer who was buying land from the school got into a legal dispute with the landowner and a Catholic priest.

=== Community colleges ===
Lone Star College System (formerly the North Harris Montgomery Community College District) serves Spring ISD, Klein ISD, and Conroe ISD, and therefore the entire Spring area. Areas in Cy-Fair ISD (and therefore Lakes on Eldridge) are in Lone Star College. Spring ISD residents and two other K–12 school districts voted to create North Harris County College. The community college district began operations in 1973.

=== Public libraries ===
Harris County Public Library (HCPL) operates several library branches.

HCPL operates the Baldwin Boettcher Branch Library at Mercer Park at 22248 Aldine Westfield Road, south of the Spring CDP. The 10,137-square-foot (941.8 m^{2}) branch opened in 1986. It was constructed on donated land. It was named after Baldwin Boettcher, a German settler. His descendants deeded the homestead to Harris County. The plans stated that the Boettcher staff would assist the Mercer Park staff in finding any botanical reference books that they or the public need.

The Barbara Bush Branch Library at Cypress Creek is at 6817 Cypresswood Drive in an area with a Spring address west of the Spring CDP. The 32,000-square-foot (3,000 m^{2}) branch opened in 1976 and was upgraded and expanded in 2002. Construction of the current library began in the summer of 2000. The current branch was anticipated to house over 120,000 books and materials, making it twice as large as the previous branch. Jesse Sendejas of the Houston Chronicle said there was "a need to provide a more spacious and accommodating facility to Spring and its surrounding areas. That was apparent when county voters approved a $15 million bond for library improvements in November 1997."

== Parks and recreation ==
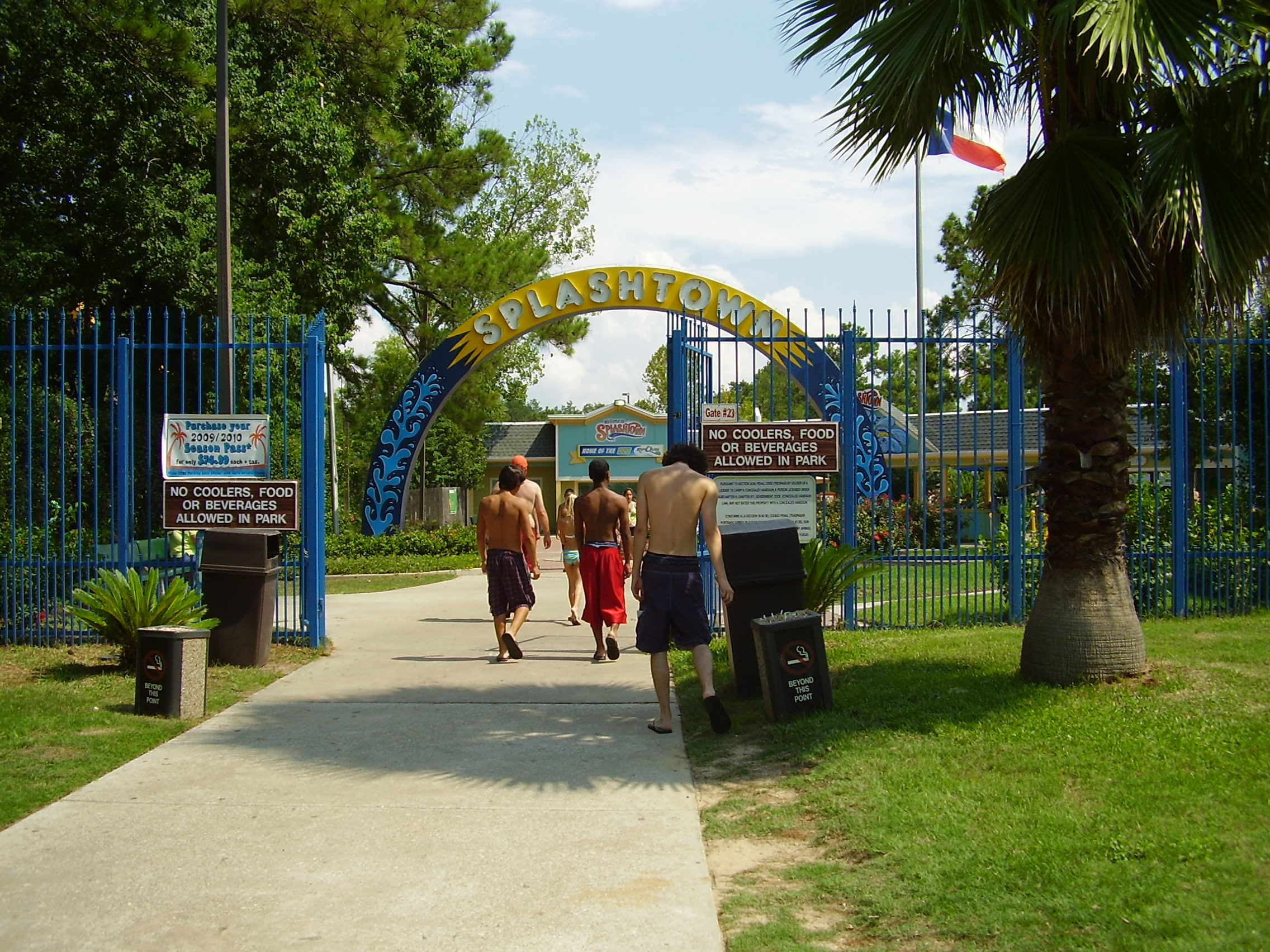
Six Flags Hurricane Harbor SplashTown

Harris County Precinct 4 operates parks in the Spring CDP. Southwell Park, a 5-acre (2.0 ha) facility located at 27419 Nelson Street, includes the B.F. Clark Community Building, a picnic pavilion with tables and a barbecue pit, one lighted basketball pavilion, barbecue grills, toilets, and two playgrounds: one for children aged 2 through 5 and one for those aged 5 through 12. Bayer Park, a 30-acre (12 ha) facility at 24811 West Hardy Road, includes four lighted softball fields, seven lighted baseball fields, and toilets. Pundt Park is a 380-acre (150 ha) park at 4129 Spring Creek Drive that was being developed as of 2008. The park was to have a canoe launch, a pavilion facility with a meeting room and toilets, a playground facility, picnic areas, and a trail system connecting Bayer Park to the Spring Creek Greenway. Precinct 4 also operates the Mercer Arboretum and Botanic Gardens, south of and adjacent to the Spring CDP at 22306 Aldine Westfield Road. The facility includes the Baldwin Boettcher Branch Library, an endangered species garden with a beaver pond, a canoe launch, picnic areas, a playground for children aged 6 through 12, a tea house, a trail, and a visitor center.

The Cypresswood Golf club is at 21602 Cypresswood Drive in the CDP. It leases the land from Harris County and maintains the facilities.

A water park called Six Flags Hurricane Harbor SplashTown is in Spring. Old Town Spring is a popular shopping area in Spring.

The Cynthia Woods Mitchell Pavilion in The Woodlands is in proximity to Spring.

=== Old Town Spring ===
Old Town Spring is an old town with over 150 shops, restaurants, and art galleries in Spring, a community in unincorporated Harris County, Texas.

Old Town Spring is north of Houston and outside Beltway 8. Many of the original buildings, some over 100 years old, now house places to buy antiques, collectibles, clothing, and gifts.

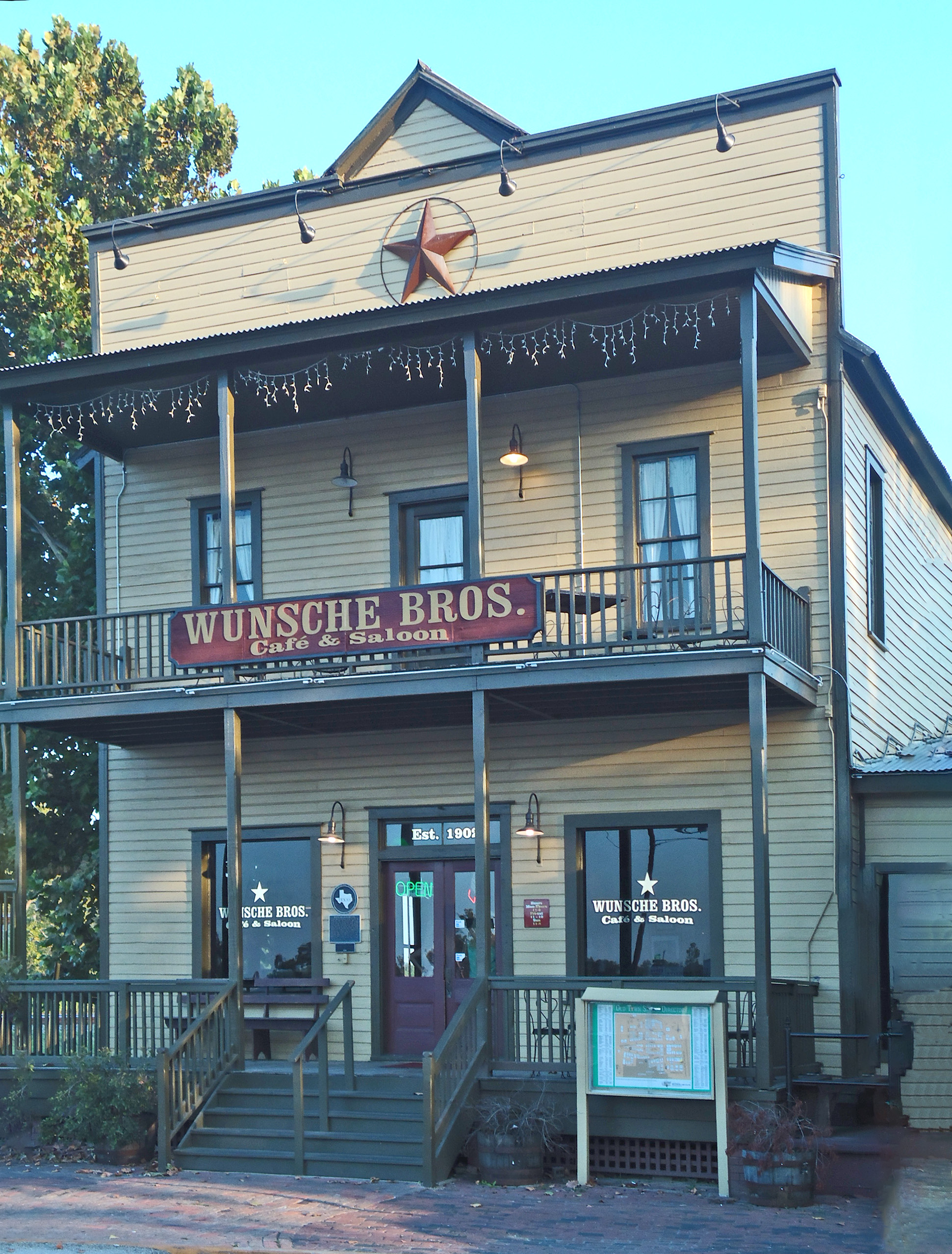
Wunsche Bros. Saloon was the first two-story building erected in Old Town Spring. It is still standing today after undergoing massive restoration after a fire burned it down. It reopened in 2019.

After the Depression, Prohibition, and a relocation of the railroad headquarters, the town slowly declined in population until Houston's oil boom in the 1970s and 1980s brought merchants back to the area.

== Notable people ==
- Greg Baldwin, voice actor, Avatar: The Last Airbender; graduated from Spring High School in 1978
- Luken Baker, MLB player for the St. Louis Cardinals
- Josh Beckett, MLB pitcher (Los Angeles Dodgers); born and raised in Spring and attended Spring High School; selected as USA Today's High School Pitcher of the Year
- Shelton Benjamin, professional wrestler and former amateur wrestler; works for World Wrestling Entertainment
- Simone Biles, artistic gymnast, Olympic gold medalist; raised and resides in Spring
- Matthew Bomer, actor, White Collar
- Austin Dean (born 1993), Major League Baseball outfielder for the San Francisco Giants
- Garrett Gerloff, motorcycle racer; two-time MotoAmerica Supersport champion in 2016 and 2017; competes in the Superbike World Championship; born and raised in Spring
- Matthew Golden, NFL player, wide receiver (Green Bay Packers); graduated from Klein Cain High School
- Chad Hedrick, speedskater; 2006, 2010 Olympian; Olympic multiple gold medalist
- Daltyn Knutson, soccer player
- Lyle Lovett, musician
- Tig Notaro, stand-up comedian
- Jonathan Owens, NFL safety (Houston Texans); resides in Spring
- Lee Pace, actor in Pushing Daisies; graduated from Spring's Klein High School
- Jim Parsons, actor, The Big Bang Theory; graduated from Klein Oak High School
- Patrick Reed, professional golfer; five professional wins; resides in Spring
- Stephen Rippy, composer; grew up in the Spring area
- Riley Ann Sawyers, child murder victim, who was a resident of Spring at the time of her murder
- Aaron Scott, basketball player
- Kendra Scott, founder of the company, Kendra Scott; graduated from Klein High School
- Eddie Steeples, actor, My Name is Earl and "Rubberband Man" from the OfficeMax ad campaigns; 1992 graduate of Klein Oak High School.
- Laura Wilkinson, Olympic diver, gold medalist in platform diving 2000 Olympics

== Photo gallery ==
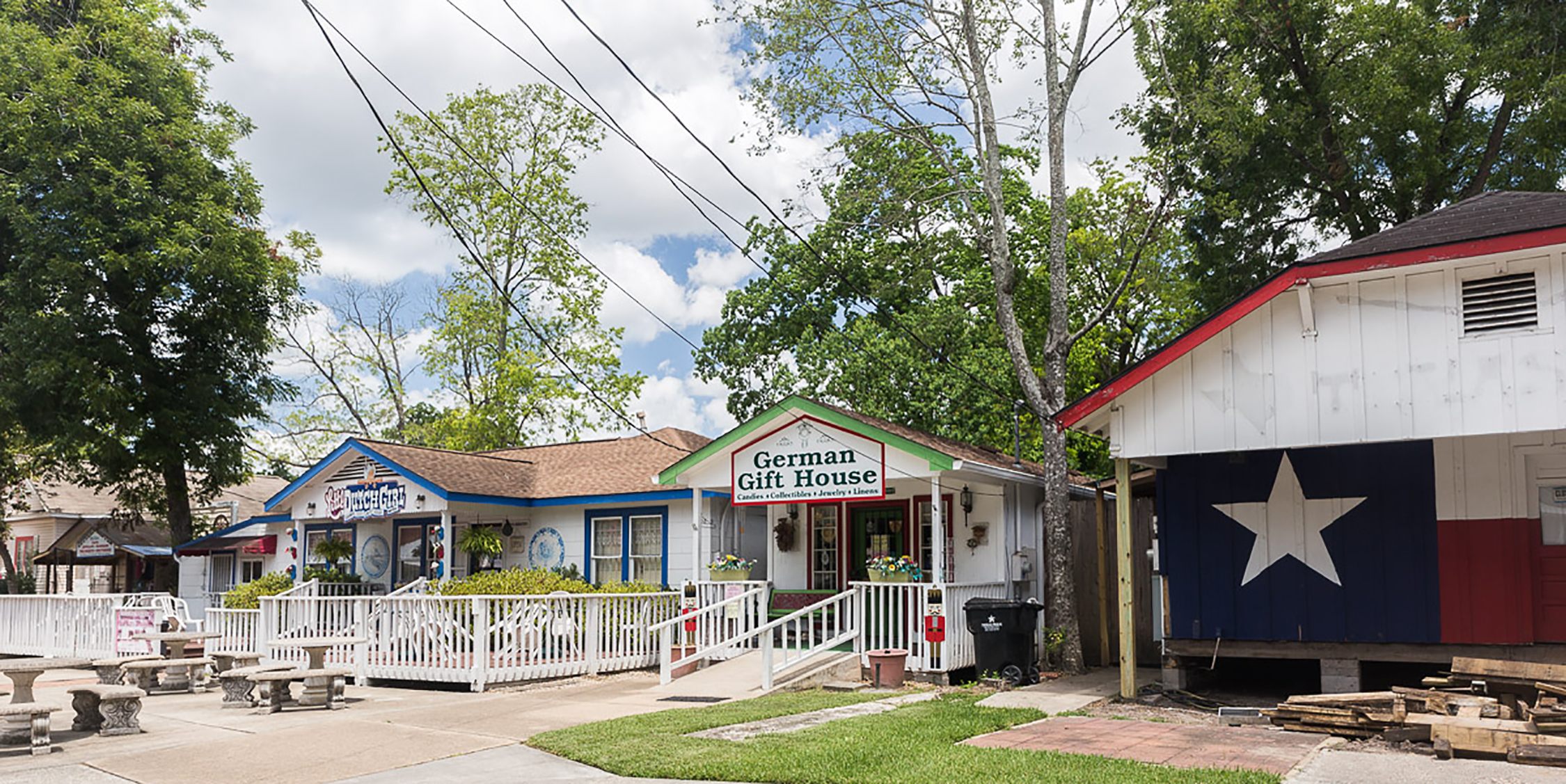

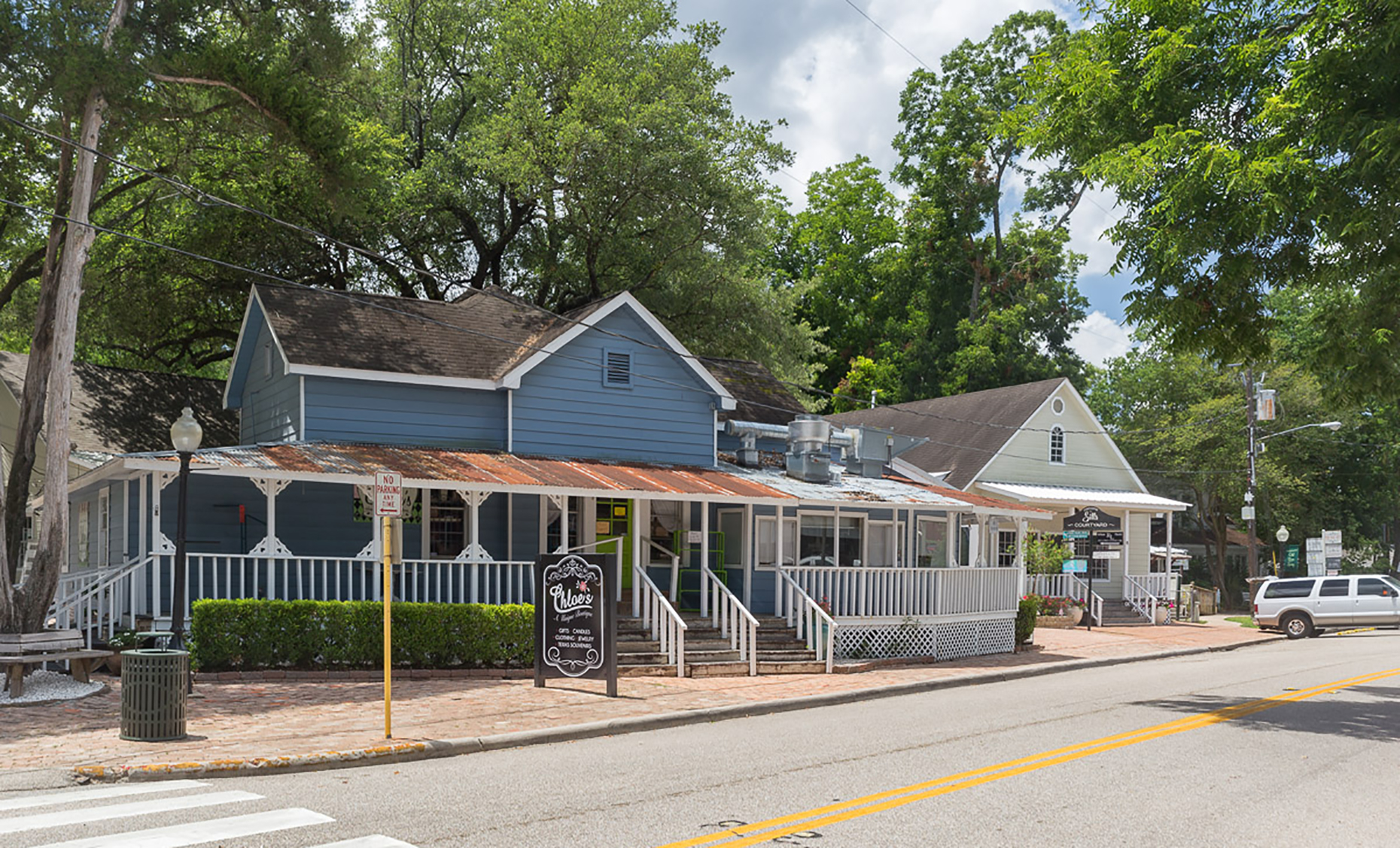

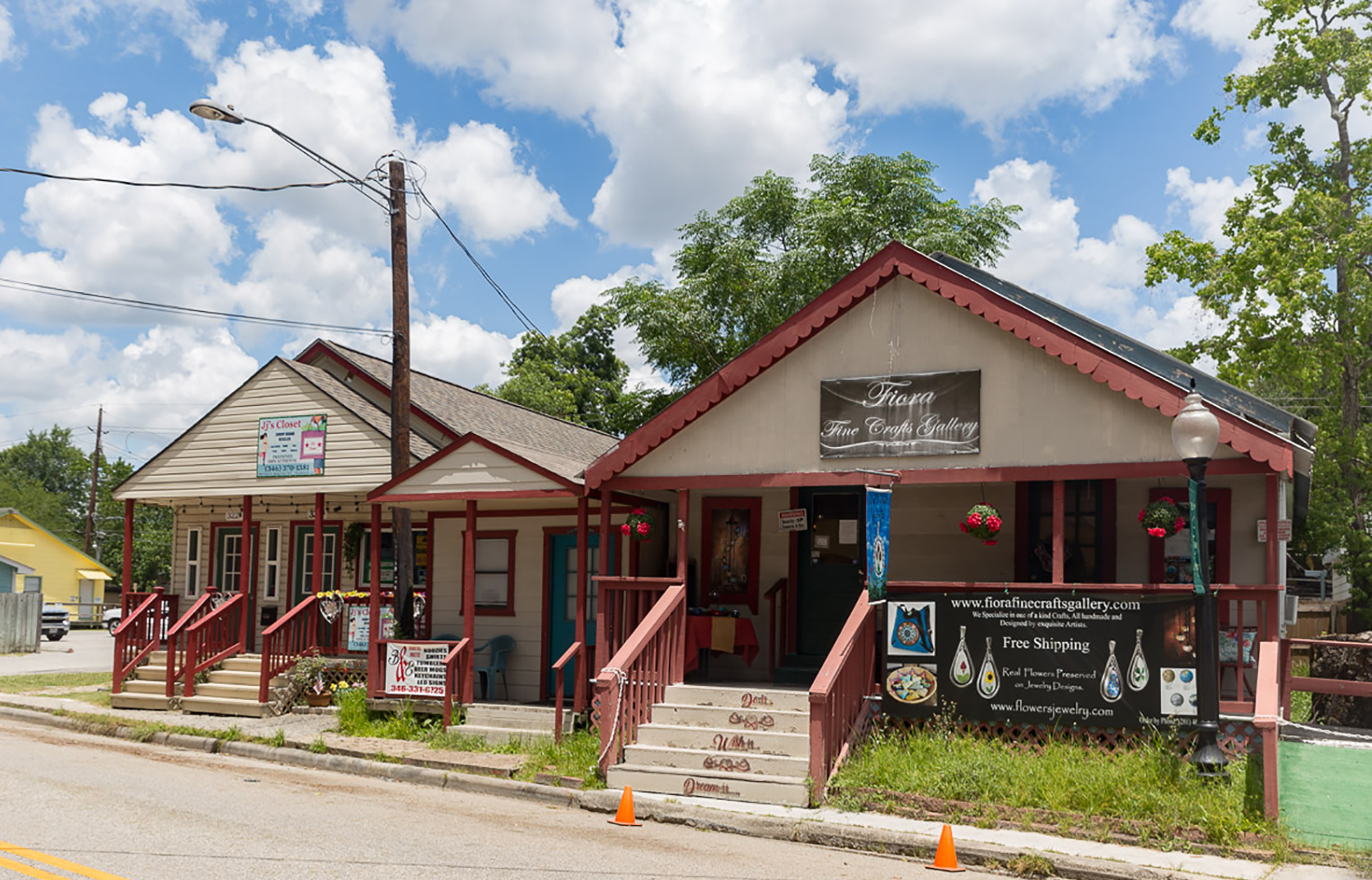

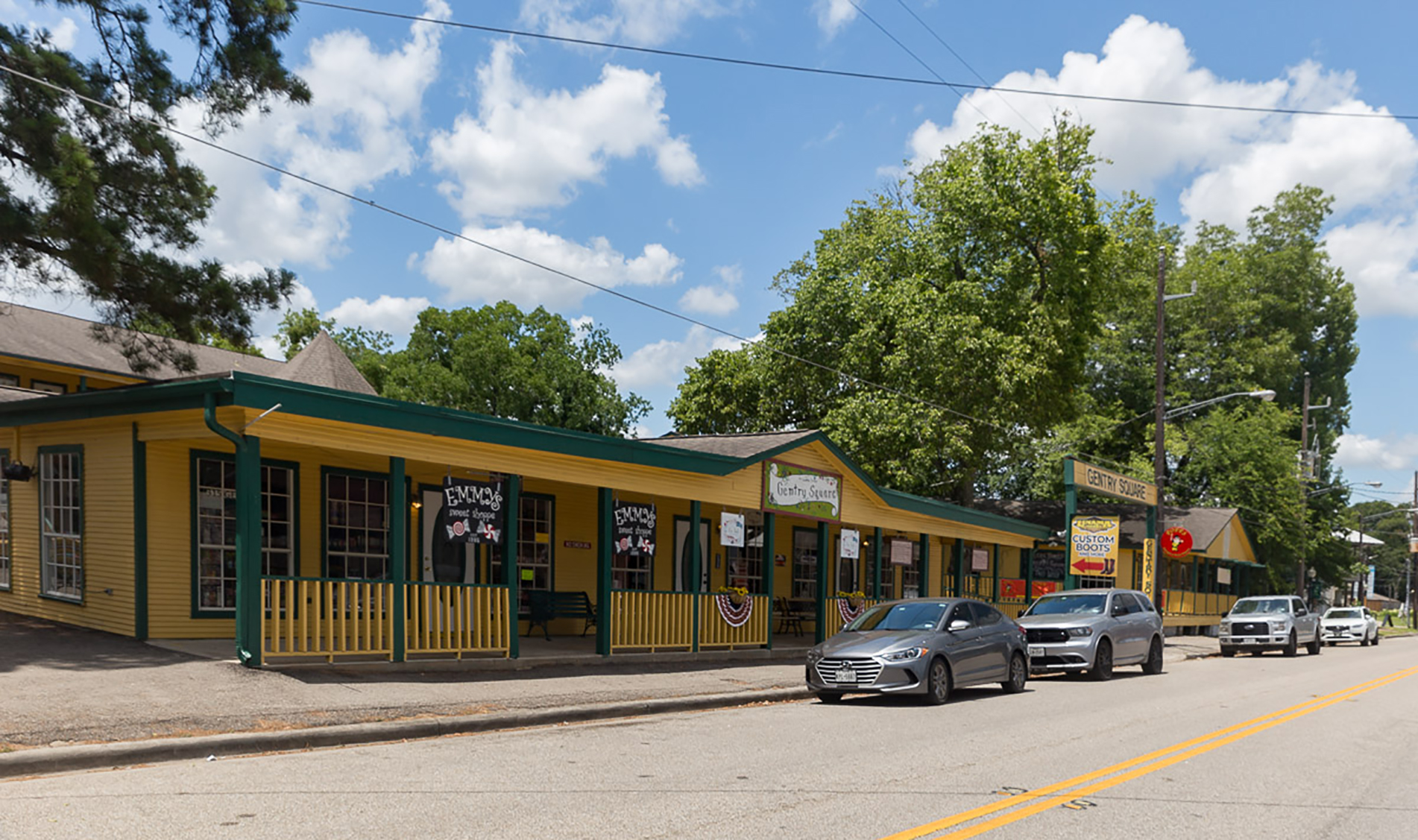

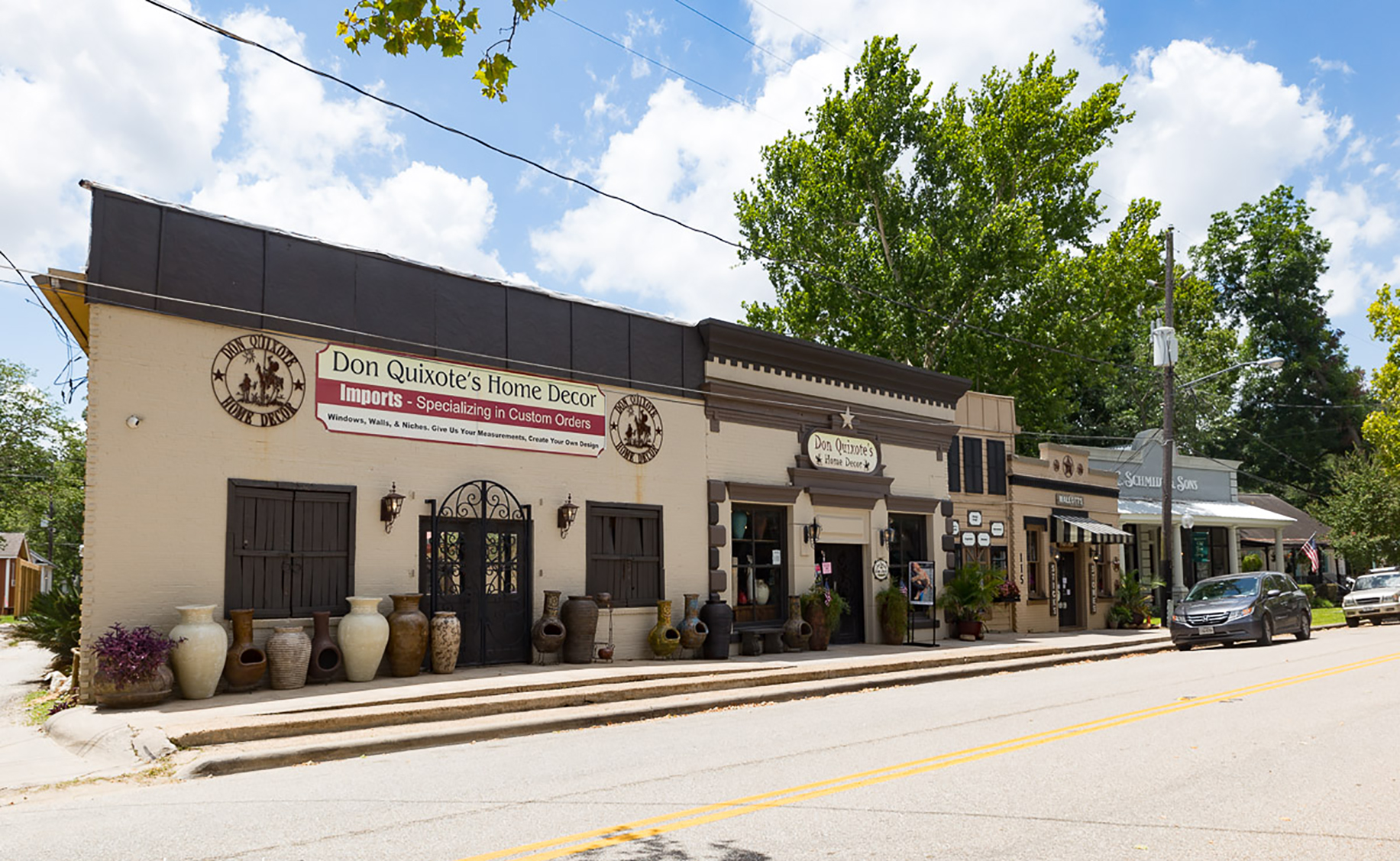
