= Northcliffe =

Northcliffe may refer to:

== People ==
- Alfred Harmsworth, 1st Viscount Northcliffe, a press baron

== Places ==
=== Australia ===
- Northcliffe, Queensland, a town on Facing Island in Gladstone Harbour in the Gladstone Region
- Northcliffe, Western Australia, a town in Western Australia

=== United States ===
- Northcliffe, Texas, an unincorporated community in Harris County, Texas, United States
- Northcliffe Manor, Texas, an unincorporated community in Harris County, Texas, United States

== Others ==
- Northcliffe Media, a newspaper publisher

== See also ==
- Northcliff, a suburb of Johannesburg, South Africa
- North Cliffe, a hamlet and former civil parish in the East Riding of Yorkshire, England
