= Northcliffe, Texas =

Neighborhood in Texas, US

Northcliffe is a neighborhood in unincorporated northwestern Harris County, Texas, United States.

It is located near Richey Road and Veterans Memorial Drive. The neighborhood is north of Northcliffe Manor, southeast of Willowbrook, and west of Kleinbrook. The subdivision is located three miles from the Houston city limits and has a Houston mailing address.

== Police service ==
The neighborhood is within the Harris County Sheriff's Office jurisdiction.

== Education ==
Most students living in Northcliffe Manor are zoned to the Klein Independent School District.

Schools include:

- Klein Forest High School
- Wunderlich Intermediate School
- Kaiser Elementary
