= Umair A. Shah =

American physician and official

- Education: Bachelor of Arts in philosophy from Vanderbilt University; Doctor of Medicine from the University of Toledo Health Science Center; Master of Public Health from the University of Texas School of Public Health
- Occupations: Physician, public health executive
- Known for: Secretary of Health for the State of Washington (2020–2025); Executive Director of Harris County Public Health (2013–2020)

Umair A. Shah is an American physician, public health executive, and former state health official. He served as the Secretary of Health for the State of Washington from 2020 to 2025, where he led the Washington State Department of Health during and after the COVID-19 pandemic. Shah has held senior leadership roles in local, county, and state public health agencies, including as executive director and Local Health Authority of Harris County Public Health in Texas, one of the largest county-level public health jurisdictions in the United States. His career spans emergency medicine, population health administration, and national public health leadership.

== Early life and education ==
Shah earned a Bachelor of Arts in philosophy from Vanderbilt University. He received his Doctor of Medicine degree from the University of Toledo Health Science Center. He subsequently completed postgraduate medical training in internal medicine, including an internship and residency, followed by a primary care and general medicine fellowship at the University of Texas Health Science Center.

Shah later earned a Master of Public Health degree with a concentration in management and policy sciences from the University of Texas School of Public Health. During his medical education, he also completed an international health policy externship with the World Health Organization in Geneva, focusing on global health systems and policy.

== Career ==
=== Early career ===
Shah began his career as an emergency medicine physician, practicing at the Michael E. DeBakey Veterans Affairs Medical Center in Houston, Texas. He later transitioned into public health leadership roles, combining clinical practice with population health administration.

=== Emergency medicine and clinical practice ===
Shah practiced as an emergency medicine physician for over 20 years, primarily at the Michael E. DeBakey Veterans Affairs Medical Center in Houston, Texas. In this role, he provided frontline emergency care to veterans in a high-volume urban medical center while concurrently engaging in public health and administrative responsibilities.

In addition to his work at the VA Medical Center, Shah held clinical roles in hospitalist and primary care settings in Texas during the early years of his medical career. His clinical work informed his later focus on integrating healthcare delivery with public health systems, particularly in emergency preparedness and population health response.

=== Harris County Public Health ===
From 2013 to 2020, Shah served as executive director and Local Health Authority of Harris County Public Health (HCPH) in Texas. In this role, he led public health and emergency response efforts for a population of nearly five million residents across one of the most populous counties in the United States.

As executive director, Shah oversaw a large, multidisciplinary public health agency responsible for disease prevention, environmental health, clinical services, and emergency preparedness. During his tenure, the agency expanded its operational scope and capacity, including significant increases in funding and staffing over the course of his tenure. Under his leadership, Harris County Public Health was named Local Health Department of the Year in 2016 and received national recognition for innovation among peer public health agencies.

Shah directed responses to multiple large-scale public health and emergency events, including hurricanes, tropical storms, chemical incidents, and infectious disease outbreaks such as Ebola, Zika virus, H1N1 influenza, and West Nile virus.

In addition to his executive role, Shah served as the county's statutory Local Health Authority, providing medical and public health oversight during declared emergencies and major disease response efforts.

=== Galveston County Health District ===
Earlier in his public health career, Shah served as Chief Medical Officer of the Galveston County Health District in Texas. In this role, he provided medical leadership for county-level public health programs, including disease prevention, clinical services, and emergency preparedness activities.

=== Washington State Department of Health ===
In December 2020, Shah was appointed Secretary of Health for the State of Washington by Governor Jay Inslee. He served in the role until January 2025, leading the Washington State Department of Health (DOH), a $3 billion agency with approximately 3,000 employees responsible for public health services for more than eight million residents.

Shah assumed office during the COVID-19 pandemic and oversaw statewide disease surveillance, vaccination strategy, testing infrastructure, and public communication efforts.

During his tenure, Washington recorded among the lowest COVID-19 mortality rates during portions of the pandemic despite being the location of the nation's first confirmed case.

Shah stepped down from the position in January 2025.

=== Later work ===
After concluding his tenure as Washington State Secretary of Health in 2025, Shah founded Rickshaw Health, a healthcare and public health advisory firm.

== Professional affiliations and national leadership ==
Shah has held leadership and advisory roles with several national public health and health policy organizations. He has served in elected and appointed positions with the National Association of County and City Health Officials (NACCHO), including serving as its national president, as well as president of its Texas affiliate. He has participated in national advisory and governance roles with organizations such as the Association of State and Territorial Health Officials (ASTHO), the National Academies of Sciences, Engineering, and Medicine, and Trust for America's Health. Shah has also served on federal advisory bodies related to public health preparedness and response, including appointments connected to the U.S. Department of Health and Human Services and the Centers for Disease Control and Prevention. Through these roles, Shah has contributed to national discussions on public health infrastructure, emergency preparedness, health equity, and the integration of public health with healthcare systems.

== Recognitions and awards ==
Shah has received national and international recognition for his contributions to public health leadership, preparedness, and system innovation. In 1999, Shah received the Outstanding Primary Care Award during his Internal Medicine Residency at the University of Texas Health Science Center at Houston.

In 2014, Shah was featured by the Houston Press in a community-focused recognition of his public health work in Harris County.

In 2015, Shah was invited to the Director's Circle at Buckingham Palace, hosted by Prince Philip.

In 2016, under Shah's leadership, Harris County Public Health was named Local Health Department of the Year by the National Association of County and City Health Officials (NACCHO).

In 2017, Shah was elected President of the National Association of County and City Health Officials (NACCHO).

In 2018, Shah received the Patient Advocacy Community Service Award from Doctors for Change. That same year, he was elected President of the Texas Association of County and City Health Officials.

In 2019, Shah was awarded the Milton and Ruth Roemer Prize for Creative Local Public Health Work by the American Public Health Association (APHA), one of the organization's highest honors recognizing innovation in public health practice. He also received the Public Service Award for Outstanding Service from the APHA that year.

In 2021, Shah was recognized as Public Official of the Year by the University of Houston.

In 2023, the Washington State Department of Health received the HIMSS Davies Award for Public Health Excellence from the Healthcare Information and Management Systems Society (HIMSS) under Shah's leadership. The agency also received Northwest Emmy Awards in PSA and Campaigns categories, presented by the National Academy of Television Arts and Sciences.

In 2024, Shah was elected to the Region X Board of Directors at the Association of State and Territorial Health Officials (ASTHO).

In 2025, Shah was awarded the Chancellor Sparks Award in Health and Preventive Medicine from the University of Nebraska Medical Center.
