= Harris County, Texas jails =

Government complex in Houston

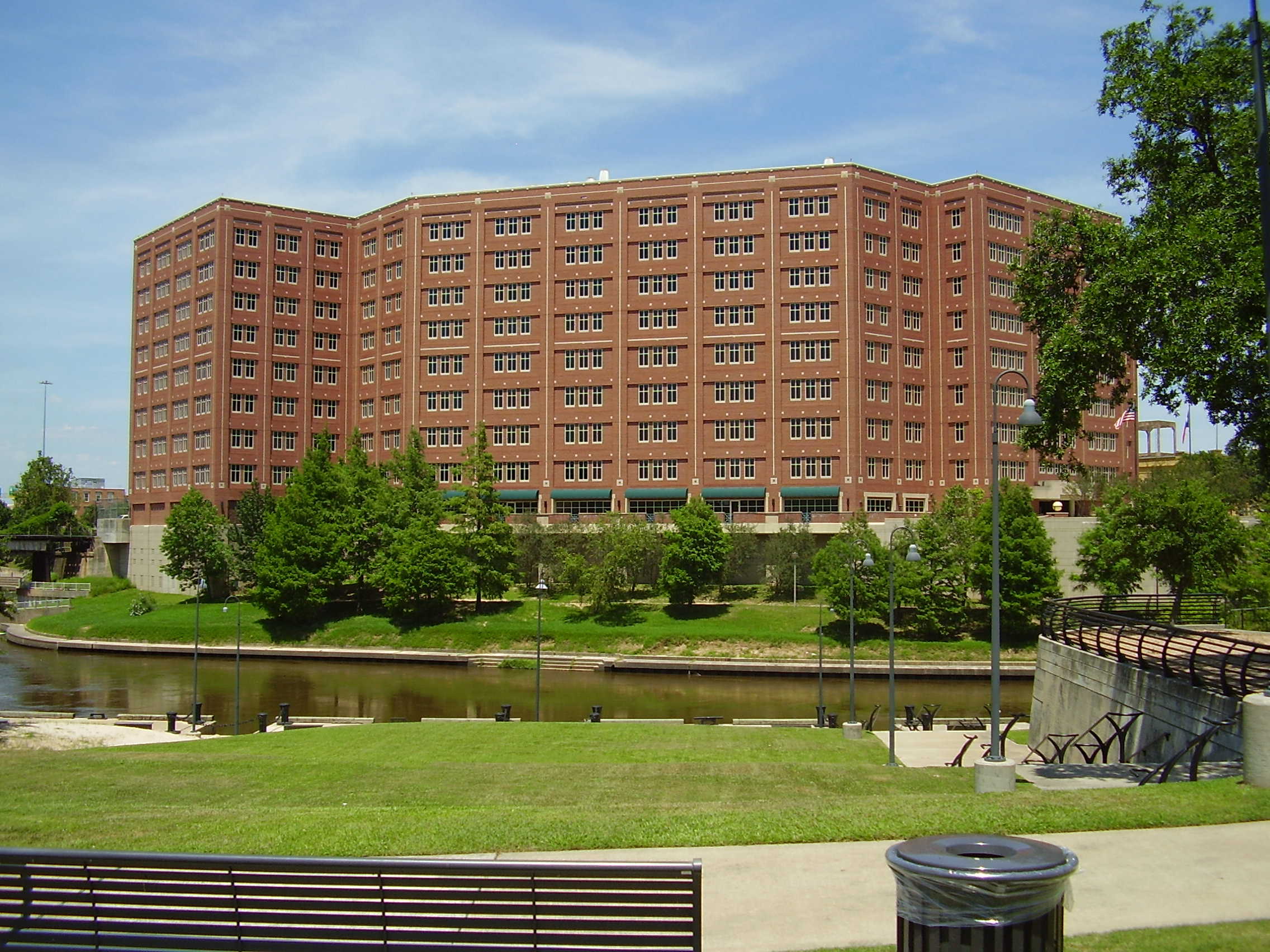
- 701 Jail, one of the jails in the complex
- Location: Houston, Texas, United States
- Governing body: Harris County Sheriff's Office

The government of Harris County, Texas maintains its main jail complex in Downtown Houston, Texas. The complex, operated by the Harris County Sheriff's Office (HCSO), lies in the peninsula formed by the Buffalo Bayou in Northern Downtown. While most of the complex is based on county jails serving Harris County, Joe Kegans State Jail is also located within the complex. The Harris County District Court is located just next to the jail complex.

== History ==
=== 1880 Jail ===
The Harris County Commissioners' Court hired Eugene T. Heiner to serve as chief architect for a new county jail to be located at the corner of Caroline Street and Preston Avenue. The previous jail had been located within the Harris County Courthouse, located at Courthouse Square, bounded by Fannin and San Jacinto streets, and by Congress and Preston avenues. This larger, free-standing jail was located two blocks away from the courthouse. The bottom two floors were decorated with arched-moldings over the windows and quoins at the corners. The third floor was formed with a mansard roof, featuring ocular windows. This jail opened in 1880.

=== 21st Century ===
In 2007 there was a proposal to construct a jail facility with a bond worth $245 million, but voters rejected it.

In 2021 prisoners reported problems with the plumbing system and lack of heat during the 2021 Texas power crisis.

In 2022 the jails had higher assault rates compared to other large jails in the state. By then the rate of prisoner deaths also increased. Lucio Vasquez of Houston Public Media stated that Texas Senate Bill 6, which ended many forms of cashless bail, may be contributing to overcrowding and deaths. As of October 2022, over 10,000 inmates are in the jail complex. As of November 2022, 24 prisoners in the jail complex died in custody in the year 2022.

In 2022, 80% of the prisoners are classified as having mental health issues, and as of November 2022, more than 12 of the deaths in custody had documented issues with mental health.

On April 5, 2024, a Gaza war protest took place outside of the jail as at least three protesters at an earlier Al Quds Day demonstration had been arrested.

== Demographics ==
As of 2024, the Harris County jail facilities together have a capacity for 9,575 inmates; at times they have held over 12,000. Due to a state-mandated staffing ratio, the HCSO had to ship inmates to other jails, including some in Louisiana; in June 2010 1,600 Harris County inmates were serving time in other jails. By January 2012 the Harris County jails had 8,573, a decrease by 31% from 2008 to 2012, and there were only 21 inmates serving time in other jail facilities, all in Texas.

The jail population increased since the Texas Legislature cut its community mental health services funding by $400 million in 2003. Between 2004 and 2009 the population of the Harris County jails increased from 7,648 to 11,546. From 2003 to 2011 the number of full-time psychiatrists increased from three to eleven. As of 2011 25% of prisoners require mental health services. Of them, 90% had been previously placed in the Harris County jail.

== Complex and facilities ==
The Harris County jail complex consists of three county jails and the Joe Kegans State Jail.

=== 1200 Jail ===
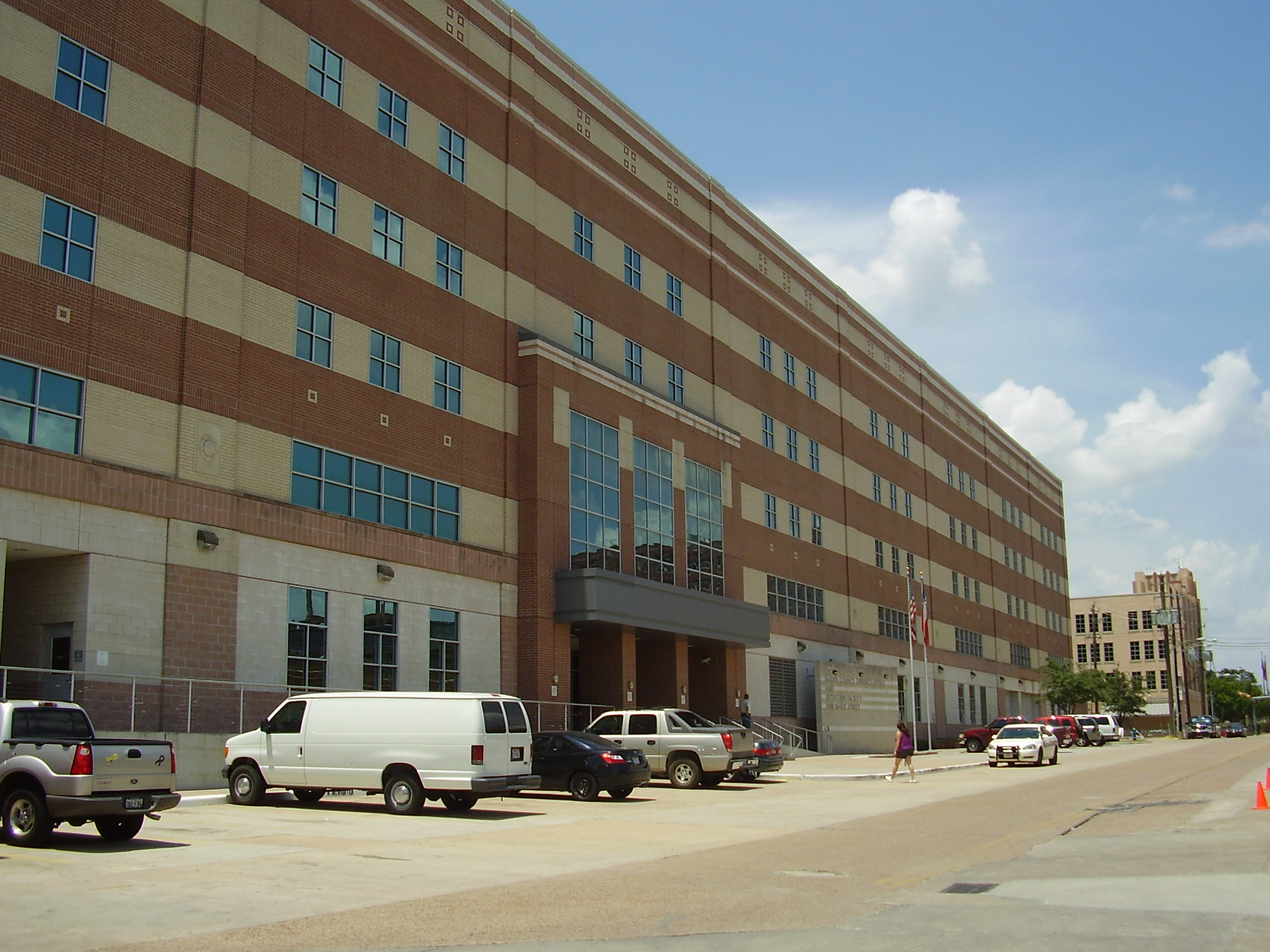
The 1200 Jail, the headquarters of the Harris County Sheriff's Office

The 1200 Jail (1200 Baker Street) opened on January 23, 2003. The 1200 Jail has the administrative offices of the Sheriff's Department. The building has 603,000 square feet (56,000 m^{2}) of space, and it has a 100,000 square feet (9,300 m^{2}) parking garage. The facility, which has 4,156 regular beds, 124 beds for the Medical Division, and 96 beds for MHMRA, is one American football field deep and two American football fields in length. 430 sheriff's deputies and detention officers work at the facility. The facility houses an inmate classification center. Each floor has counseling rooms, MHMRA examination/interview rooms, multi-purpose rooms, a recreation area, triage rooms. The fourth floor houses women. The sixth floor houses a law library and vocational rooms. The jail offers New Choices, a substance abuse program. The 1200 Jail includes a large medical clinic, a dental facility, an infirmary, mental health facilities, a pharmacy, an x-ray facility.

=== 701 Jail ===
The 701 Jail (701 North San Jacinto Street) is one of the largest detention facilities in the United States. The seven floor 701 Jail has 4,144 inmate beds. The 701 Jail, originally a five-story building to be used as a cold storage warehouse, opened in the late 1920s. The Houston Terminal Warehouse and Cold Storage Facility was constantly occupied throughout its history. In 1989 the county completed the planning and design stage of its new jail. The cold storage portion was allowed to thaw, and construction on the facility began in December of that year. The facility was gutted and two floors were added. The 701 Jail opened in August 1991. Harris County stated that the re-use of the warehouse saved the county about $21,000,000. About 600 sheriff's deputies and detention officers work in the facility. The county designates the 701 Jail as a "Direct Observation" facility, where staff members monitor inmates continuously for 24 hours per day, 7 days per week. In 2002 the 701 Jail was the second largest American jail, with the Los Angeles County Men's Central Jail of the Los Angeles County Sheriff's Department being the largest.

=== 1307 Jail ===
The 1307 Jail (1307 Baker Street), located east of the 701 Jail, was originally built as a state jail for the Texas Department of Criminal Justice. The building was at first occupied by the Harris County Community Supervision and Corrections Department. The building reopened under the Sheriff's office in 1998. As of 2010 the Harris County Sheriff's Office is leasing the facility. The 1,070 inmate beds are located in two wings. The county designates this jail as a "Semi-Direct Observation," where staff members monitor inmates in the dormitory area continuously for twenty-four hours per day, seven days per week. One lieutenant, nine sergeants, and 112 sheriff's deputies and detention officers staff the jail. The jail also has the Farm Shop, a place where stray livestock confiscated by the Sheriff are kept.

=== Joe Kegans State Jail ===
The Joe Kegans State Jail is a Texas state jail that generally houses inmates from Harris County serving shorter term felonies. It is the only jail in the complex that is a state facility in contrast to a county jail.

=== Former facilities ===
The 850,000 square feet (79,000 m^{2}) 1301 Franklin facility opened on September 13, 1982. The county built the jail due to the aftermath of the early 1980s Alberti lawsuit. The jail, with 13 stories and a basement, had the HCSO's administrative offices. The facility opened on September 13, 1982, and had the capacity to house around 4,000 inmates. After the opening of the 1200 Jail on January 23, 2003, the former Franklin facility was no longer used as a jail. Currently the HCSO's Crime Scene Unit, Emergency Dispatch Center(EDC), Warrants and A.F.I.S is housed in the building.

The 301 San Jacinto facility is a former jail. Before 1982 a portion of the 3rd floor had the headquarters of the HCSO. Three floors housed inmates. The basement had the booking, kitchen, laundry, and releasing areas. The commissary operated in a room on one of the housing floors. The Alberti lawsuit forced the county to build additional jails. In 2002 400 trustees were housed in the top four floors in the building. As of the same year administrative offices, court processing/holding cells, and visitation facilities were in the basement. The facility's formal capacity was 409.

=== Other facilities ===
The Crites Vocational Center is away from the main jail area.

== Programs ==
In the middle of the 1970s the county government established job training courses for inmates of the county jail. The state of Texas provided funding. Houston Community College (HCC) assisted with the program. Vocational programs happen around Downtown and have done so since September 2004, when the former Atascocita boot camp, which once housed the programs, was closed.

The jail no longer has animal husbandry programs as generally prisoners no longer are positioned for agricultural careers. The jail officers discontinued wearing cowboy boots, television and radio repair was deemed obsolete, and the county authorities began purchasing furniture instead of reupholstering existing pieces; these actions resulted in the end of leathercraft, radio and television repair, and upholstery programs.

Previously the jail only had job training for male inmates in certain programs but by 2019 began admitting female inmates into these programs.

In previous eras prisoners who still had the right to vote, as in prisoners who were not convicted of felony offenses, received mail-in ballots so they could vote elections. In 2021 the jail set up a dedicated center for voting. In November of that year 96 prisoners voted.

== Overcrowding ==
The Harris County Jail has faced chronic overcrowding in recent decades. In March 1992, the jail was 43% over capacity less than a year after the opening of a new 4,000-bed facility. Police overtime arrests and drug case sentencing practices were highlighted as significant contributors to the population increase.

A Criminal Justice Coordinating Council was created in 2009 with goals including the reduction of the jail population. A report from the same year recommended more diversion programs and revised bail bond practices.

=== Outsourcing ===
Harris County spends $50 million of taxpayer funds annually on the outsourcing of people held in the jail. In September 2024, Harris County announced that it would begin outsourcing people in its custody to Natchitoches Parish Detention Center, located more than 200 miles away in Louisiana. This became the County's third out-of-state outsourcing contract, in addition to ones with Tallahatchie County Correctional Facility in Mississippi and the LaSalle Correctional Center in Louisiana. Tallahatchie County Correctional Facility is operated by CoreCivic.

Harris County spends millions to house inmates in private, out-of-state prisons, raising concerns about oversight and accountability. Facilities like LaSalle and CoreCivic's Tallahatchie have faced allegations of neglect, abuse, and substandard care. The prisons are accredited by the American Correctional Association, whose process has been criticized as ineffective and biased. Advocates call for reducing the jail population by dismissing low-level nonviolent cases, but the district attorney has resisted.

== Abuse and neglect of detainees ==
Harris County Jail has been known publicly as one of the most violent and deadly jails in the country. Harris County Jail has a long history of guards assaulting prisoners brutally to death, failure in protecting prisoners from assaults, solitary confinement as punishment, allowing suicides attempts of vulnerable detainees, and medically neglecting pregnant women.

Mikayla Savage, a 23-year-old woman had a miscarriage after a detention officer and other prisoners had allegedly assaulted her while in the Harris County Jail.

== Detainee deaths ==
Between 2019 and 2024, more than 90 people have died while in the jail's custody.

On February 15, 2023, the Federal Bureau of Investigation opened a federal civil rights investigation into the jail after dozens of inmate deaths in the past few years: 21 in 2021, 28 in 2022, and 4 in the first two months of 2023. The investigation looked into the February 2021 death of Jaquaree Simmons, and the January 2023 death of Jacoby Pillow. An earlier internal investigation into Simmons's death by the Harris County Sheriff's Office led to 11 firings, 6 suspensions, and one corrections worker charged for manslaughter.

== See also ==
- Crime in Houston
- Rikers Island (New York City)
- Twin Towers Correctional Facility (Los Angeles)
- Cook County Jail (Chicago)

== Bibliography ==
- Bradley, Barrie Scardino (2020). Improbable Metropolis: Houston's Architectural and Urban History. Austin: University of Texas Press. ISBN 978-1-4773-2019-8.
