= Kleinbrook, Texas =

Unincorporated community in Texas, US

Kleinbrook is an unincorporated community in northwestern Harris County, Texas, United States.

It is located near Beltway 8 and Bammel North Houston Drive, it is east of the Willowbrook area of Houston, and south of the unincorporated area of Champion Forest. The main road of the subdivision is Bammel North Houston Drive.

Fifteen developers, including Genstar, Ryland, Mint Homes and U.S. Home, built houses in Kleinbrook.

== History ==
In 2001 most of the houses in Kleinbrook were built in the 1980s before the economy collapsed.

== Government and infrastructure ==
Klein is within Harris County Precinct 4. As of 2010 Jack Cagle heads the precinct.

The community is served by the Harris County Sheriff's Office District I Patrol, headquartered from the Cypresswood Substation at 6831 Cypresswood Drive. The area is served by the Northwest Volunteer Fire Department.

== Education ==
Students living in Kleinbrook are zoned to the Klein Independent School District. The zoned schools are Klenk Elementary School, Wunderlich Intermediate School, and Klein Forest High School. The zoning to the Klein Independent School District schools attracted residents to Kleinbrook. In January 2004 the Klein ISD board of trustees considered rezoning Kleinbrook to McDougle Elementary School in Proposal 2; at that time Kleinbrook had 230 students.
