= Harris County, Texas =

County in Texas, U.S.

- County
- Downtown Houston, Harris County Courthouse

- Flag Seal

- Location within the U.S. state of Texas
- Coordinates: 29.857273°N 95.393037°W
- Country: United States
- State: Texas
- Founded: December 22, 1836 (created); March 10, 1837 (organized)
- Named for: John Richardson Harris
- Seat: Houston
- Largest city: Houston

Government
  - County judge: Lina Hidalgo

Area
  - Total: 1,777.359 sq mi (4,603.34 km^{2})
  - Land: 1,707.288 sq mi (4,421.86 km^{2})
  - Water: 70.071 sq mi (181.48 km^{2}) 3.94%

Population (2020)
  - Total: 4,731,145
  - Estimate (2025): 5,045,026 ▲
  - Density: 2,771.146/sq mi (1,069.946/km^{2})

GDP
  - Total: $592.751 billion (2024)
- Time zone: UTC−6 (Central)
  - Summer (DST): UTC−5 (CDT)
- Congressional districts: 2nd, 7th, 8th, 9th, 18th, 22nd, 29th, 36th, 38th
- Website: harriscountytx.gov

Harris County is a county located in the U.S. state of Texas. As of the 2020 census, the population was 4,731,145, and was estimated to be 5,045,026 in 2025, making it the most populous county in Texas and the third-most populous county in the United States. Its county seat is Houston, the most populous city in Texas and the fourth-most populous city in the United States. The county was founded on December 22, 1836 and organized on March 10, 1837. It is named for John Richardson Harris, who founded the town of Harrisburg on Buffalo Bayou in 1826. It contains over 16% of the state's population. Harris County is included in the nine-county Houston–Pasadena–The Woodlands metropolitan statistical area, which is the fifth-most populous metropolitan area in the United States.

== History ==
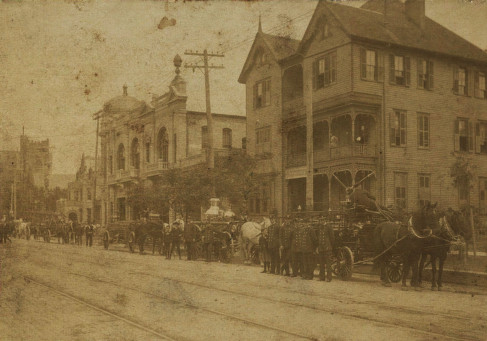
Firefighters on San Jacinto Street, circa 1914

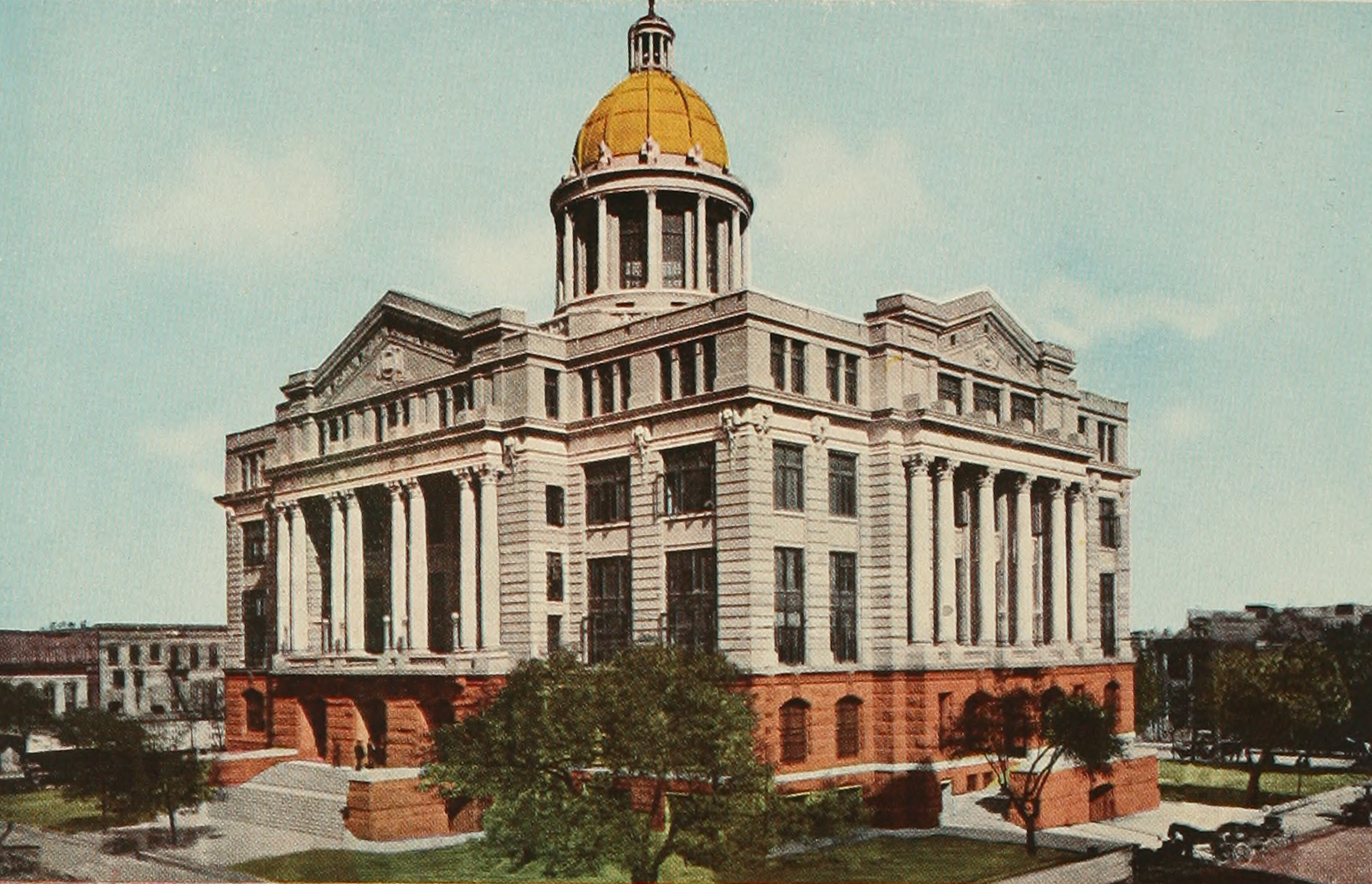
The Harris County Courthouse in Houston, in 1913

Human remains date habitation to about 4000 BC. Other evidence of humans in the area dates from about 1400 BC, 1 AD, and later in the first millennium. The region became uninhabited from 1 AD to European contact. Little European activity predates 1821. Álvar Núñez Cabeza de Vaca may have visited the area in 1529. French traders recorded passing through in the 18th century. Spaniards attempted to establish a fort in the area around the same time, but did not persist for long.

The first recorded European settlers in Harris County arrived in 1822. Their schooner sailed into Galveston Bay and ran aground on the Red Fish Bar. Some of those passengers traveled further up the bay system, but it is not known whether they settled up Buffalo Bayou or the San Jacinto River. One of these passengers, a Mr. Ryder, settled at what is now known as Morgan's Point, Texas. Also in 1822, John Iiams settled his family at Cedar Point after sailing from Berwick's Bay, Louisiana. Dr. Johnson Hunter arrived just after Iiams. He also wrecked his boat near Galveston. He settled at Morgan's Point and was a grantee of land there. Nathaniel Lynch settled in the area and operated a ferry.

In 1824, the land empresario, Stephen F. Austin convened at the house of William Scott for the purpose of conveying titles for Mexican headrights. He was joined by the land commissioner, Baron von Bastrop, and Austin's secretary, Samuel May Williams. About thirty families gained legal titles to land in what would later be known as Harris County. A few immigrants settled on Buffalo Bayou in these early years, including Moses Callahan, Ezekial Thomas, and the Vince brothers.

Nicolas Clopper arrived in the Galveston Bay area from Ohio in the 1820s. He attempted to develop Buffalo Bayou as a trading conduit for the Brazos River valley. He acquired land at Morgan's Point in 1826. John Richardson Harris (1790–1829), for whom the county was later named, arrived in 1824. Harris had moved his family to Sainte Genevieve, Missouri Territory, where they had been residing until the early 1820s.

Harris was granted a league of land (about 4,428 acres) at Buffalo Bayou. He platted the town of Harrisburg in 1826, while he established a trading post and a grist mill there. He ran boats transporting goods between New Orleans and Harrisburg until his death in the fall of 1829.

The First Congress of the Republic of Texas established Harrisburg County on December 22, 1836. The original county boundaries included Galveston Island, but were redrawn to its current configuration in May 1838.

The area has had a number of severe weather events, such as the following hurricanes and tropical storms:

- "Galveston" (1900)
- "Texas" (1941)
- "Surprise" (1943)
- Carla (1961)
- Alicia (1983)
- Rita (2005)
- Allison (2001)
- Erin (2007)
- Ike (2008)
- Harvey (2017)
- Imelda (2019)
- Beta (2020)
- Nicholas (2021)
- Beryl (2024)
- Arthur (2026)

== Geography ==
According to the United States Census Bureau, the county has a total area of 1,777.359 square miles (4,603.34 km^{2}), of which 1,707.288 square miles (4,421.86 km^{2}) is land and 70.071 square miles (181.48 km^{2}) (3.94%) is water. It is the 14th largest county in Texas by total area. Both its total area and land area are larger than the U.S. state of Rhode Island.

=== Adjacent counties ===
Montgomery
Waller	northwest	north	northeast	Liberty
		self	east	Chambers
Fort Bend	southwest	south	southeast	Galveston
Brazoria

== Communities ==
=== Cities ===
==== Multiple counties ====
- Baytown (partly in Chambers County)
- Friendswood (mostly in Galveston County)
- Houston (county seat and largest municipality) (small parts in Fort Bend and Montgomery counties)
- Katy (partly in Fort Bend, Harris, and Waller counties)
- League City (mostly in Galveston County)
- Missouri City (mostly in Fort Bend County)
- Pearland (mostly in Brazoria County and a small part in Fort Bend County)
- Seabrook (some water surface in Chambers County)
- Stafford (mostly in Fort Bend County)
- Waller (partly in Waller County)

==== Harris County only ====
- Bellaire
- Bunker Hill Village
- Deer Park
- El Lago
- Galena Park
- Hedwig Village
- Hilshire Village
- Humble
- Hunters Creek Village
- Jacinto City
- Jersey Village
- La Porte
- Morgan's Point
- Nassau Bay
- Pasadena
- Piney Point Village
- South Houston
- Southside Place
- Spring Valley Village
- Taylor Lake Village
- Tomball
- Webster
- West University Place

Lomax consolidated into La Porte in 1980. Shoreacres consolidated into La Porte in 2026.

=== Unincorporated areas ===
==== Census-designated places ====
- Aldine
- Atascocita
- Barrett
- Channelview
- Cinco Ranch (mostly in Fort Bend County)
- Cloverleaf
- Crosby
- Highlands
- Mission Bend (mostly in Fort Bend County)
- Sheldon
- Spring
- The Woodlands (mostly in Montgomery County)

==== Other communities ====
- Alief (Partially annexed by Houston, partially unincorporated)
- Airline
- Bammel
- Barker
- Beaumont Place
- Bridgeland Community
- Cedar Bayou
- Champion Forest
- Cimarron
- Coady
- Cypress
- Dyersdale
- East Aldine
- Fall Creek
- Hockley
- Houmont Park
- Huffman
- Hufsmith
- Kinwood
- Klein
- Kleinbrook
- Kohrville
- Louetta
- Lynchburg
- McNair
- North Houston
- Northcliffe
- Northcliffe Manor
- Northgate Forest
- Remington Ranch
- Rose Hill
- Satsuma
- Traces
- Westfield

== Demographics ==
Historical population
Census	Pop.	Note	%±
1850	4,668		—
1860	9,070		94.3%
1870	17,375		91.6%
1880	27,985		61.1%
1890	37,249		33.1%
1900	63,786		71.2%
1910	115,693		81.4%
1920	186,667		61.3%
1930	359,328		92.5%
1940	528,961		47.2%
1950	806,701		52.5%
1960	1,243,158		54.1%
1970	1,741,912		40.1%
1980	2,409,547		38.3%
1990	2,818,199		17.0%
2000	3,400,578		20.7%
2010	4,092,459		20.3%
2020	4,731,145		15.6%
2025 (est.)	5,045,026	▲	6.6%
U.S. Decennial Census; 1850–1900 1910; 1920 1930 1940; 1950 1960 1970; 1980 1990 2000; 2010 2020

=== 2024 housing value ===
As of the third quarter of 2024, the median home value in Harris County was $295,790.

=== American Community Survey 2025 data ===
The United States Census Bureau estimated that in 2025, Harris County’s population was 5,045,026. It was also estimated that the county's population was 24.94% Non-Hispanic White, 46.06% Hispanic or Latino, 18.79% Non-Hispanic Black, 7.75% Asian, 0.17% Native American, 0.07% Pacific Islander, and 2.23% Multiracial.

Total	Population	Percentage
Non-Hispanic White	1,258,010	24.94%
Hispanic or Latino	2,323,633	46.06%
Non-Hispanic Black	947,847	18.79%
Asian	391,122	7.75%
Native American	8,677	0.17%
Pacific Islander	3,312	0.07%
Non-Hispanic Multiracial	112,425	2.23%

=== 2020 census ===
As of the 2020 census, Harris County had a population of 4,731,145, 1,692,730 households, and 1,156,059 families; the population density was 2,771.7 inhabitants per square mile (1,071.7 per square kilometer).

As of the 2020 census, the median age was 34.3 years, with 25.6% of residents under the age of 18 and 11.5% aged 65 or older; there were 97.1 males for every 100 females and 94.9 males for every 100 females age 18 and over.

As of the 2020 census, the racial makeup of the county was 36.4% White, 19.2% Black or African American, 1.2% American Indian and Alaska Native, 7.4% Asian, 0.1% Native Hawaiian and Pacific Islander, 18.9% from some other race, and 16.9% from two or more races, with Hispanic or Latino residents of any race comprising 43.0% of the population.

As of the 2020 census, 98.9% of residents lived in urban areas and 1.1% lived in rural areas.

As of the 2020 census, 36.9% of the county’s households had children under 18, 44.9% were married-couple households, 20.1% had a male householder without a spouse or partner, 28.6% had a female householder without a spouse or partner, 25.6% were made up of individuals, and 7.2% had someone living alone who was 65 or older.

As of the 2020 census, there were 1,842,683 housing units, of which 8.1% were vacant; among occupied units, 53.3% were owner-occupied, 46.7% were renter-occupied, the homeowner vacancy rate was 1.6%, and the rental vacancy rate was 10.2%.

As of the 2020 census, 55.6% of residents aged five and older spoke only English at home while 44.4% spoke another language at home, alone or together with English; Spanish remained the second most spoken language at 35%.

As of 2020, the poverty rate was 15.6%.

=== Racial and ethnic composition ===
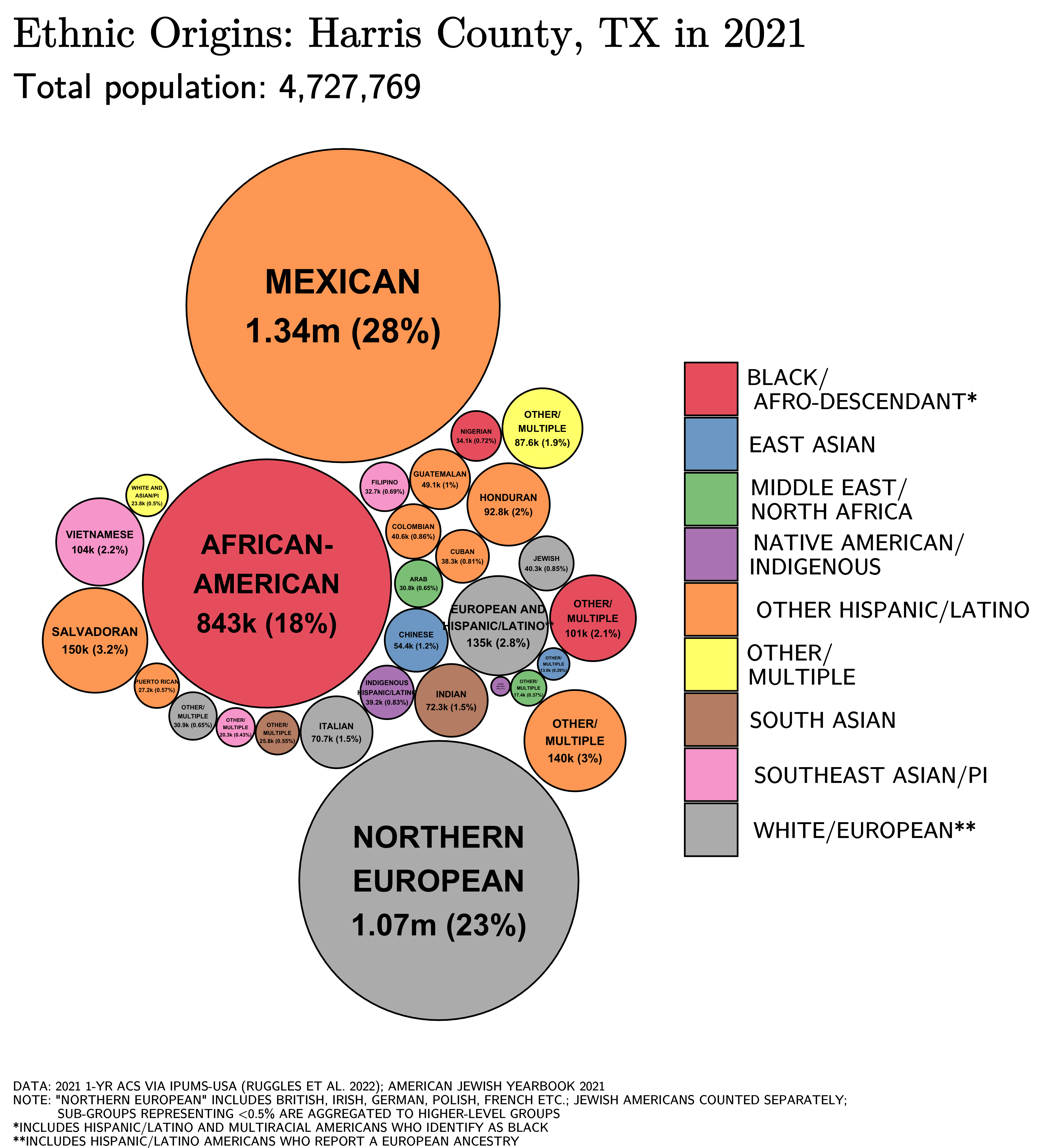
Ethnic origins in Harris County

Harris County, Texas – Racial and ethnic composition Note: the US Census treats Hispanic/Latino as an ethnic category. This table excludes Latinos from the racial categories and assigns them to a separate category. Hispanics/Latinos may be of any race.
Race / Ethnicity (NH = Non-Hispanic)	Pop 1980	Pop 1990	Pop 2000	Pop 2010	Pop 2020	% 1980	% 1990	% 2000	% 2010	% 2020
White alone (NH)	1,509,430	1,528,113	1,432,264	1,349,646	1,309,593	62.64%	54.22%	42.12%	32.98%	27.68%
Black or African American alone (NH)	469,290	527,964	619,694	754,258	885,517	19.48%	18.73%	18.22%	18.43%	18.72%
Native American or Alaska Native alone (NH)	5,346	6,143	7,103	8,150	8,432	0.22%	0.22%	0.21%	0.20%	0.18%
Asian alone (NH)	46,355	106,327	173,026	249,853	344,762	1.92%	3.77%	5.09%	6.11%	7.29%
Native Hawaiian or Pacific Islander alone (NH)	x	x	1,392	2,260	3,199	x	x	0.04%	0.06%	0.07%
Other race alone (NH)	10,049	4,717	4,499	7,914	23,262	0.42%	0.17%	0.13%	0.19%	0.49%
Mixed race or Multiracial (NH)	x	x	42,849	48,838	121,671	x	x	1.26%	1.19%	2.57%
Hispanic or Latino (any race)	369,077	644,935	1,119,751	1,671,540	2,034,709	15.32%	22.88%	32.93%	40.84%	43.01%
Total	2,409,547	2,818,199	3,400,578	4,092,459	4,731,145	100.00%	100.00%	100.00%	100.00%	100.00%

=== Child welfare estimates ===
Children At Risk—a local nonprofit research organization—estimated that 21% of Harris County children lived in poverty, 6.5 per 1,000 infants died before age one, and 38% dropped out of high school as of 2007.

=== 2000 census ===
In 2000, 1,961,993 residents of Harris County spoke English only. The five most spoken foreign languages in the county were Spanish or Spanish Creole (1,106,883 speakers), Vietnamese (53,311), Chinese (33,003), French including Louisiana French and Patois (33,003), and Urdu (14,595). Among these groups, 46% of Spanish speakers, 37% of Vietnamese speakers, 50% of Chinese speakers, 85% of French speakers, and 72% of Urdu speakers said that they spoke English at least "very well".

=== Religion ===
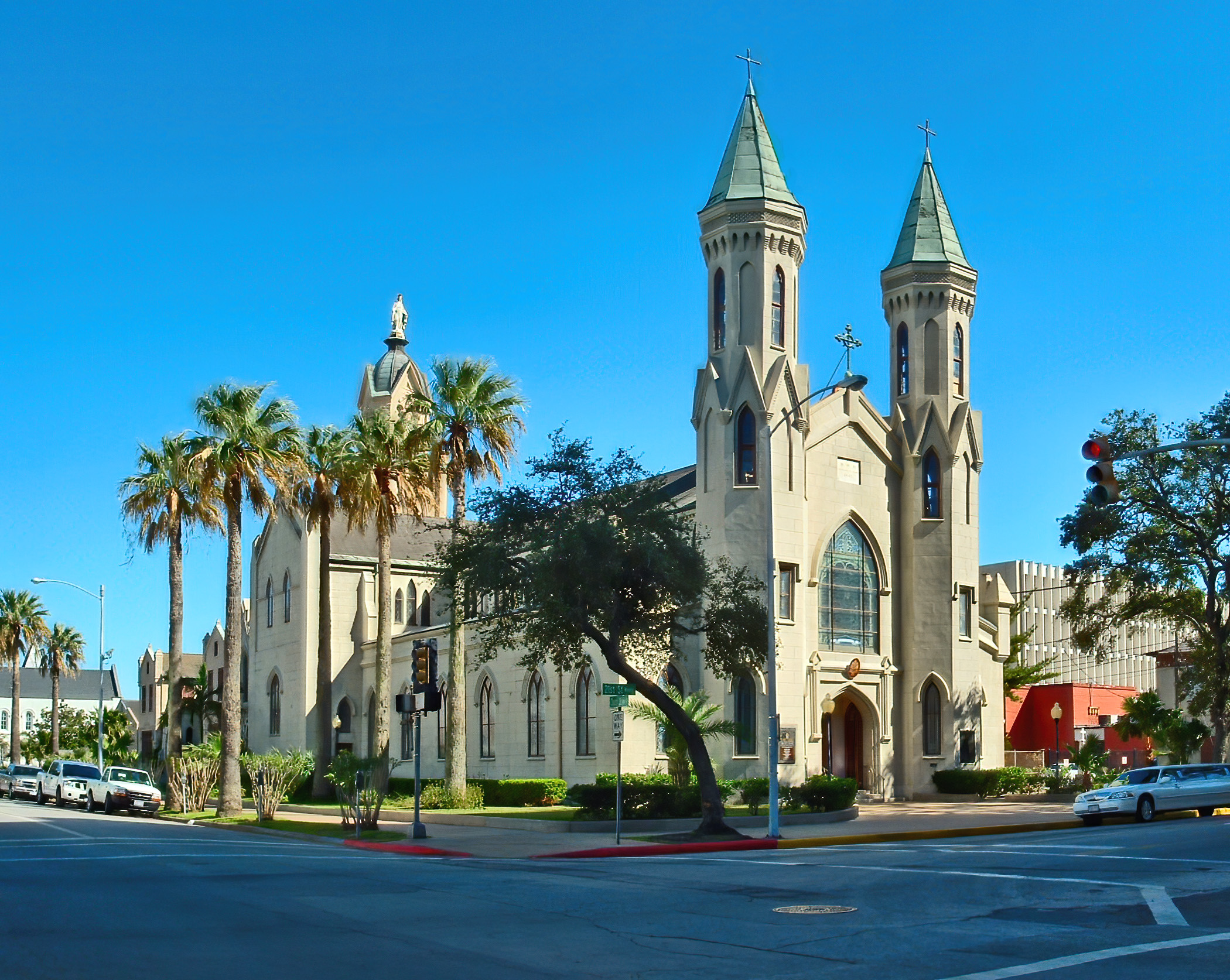
Saint Mary Cathedral Basilica, seat of the Roman Catholic Archdiocese of Galveston–Houston

In 2010 statistics, the largest religious group in Harris County was the Roman Catholic Archdiocese of Galveston–Houston, with 1,947,223 Catholics worshiping at 109 parishes, followed by 579,759 Southern Baptists with 811 congregations, 348,461 non-denominational Christian adherents with 577 congregations, 182,624 United Methodists with 124 congregations, an estimated 117,148 Muslims with 47 congregations, 44,472 LDS Mormons with 77 congregations, 39,041 Episcopalians with 43 congregations, 34,957 PC-USA Presbyterians with 49 congregations, 33,525 Churches of Christ Christians with 124 congregations, and 30,521 LCMS Lutherans with 46 congregations. Altogether, 58.4% of the population was claimed as members by religious congregations, although members of historically African-American denominations were underrepresented due to incomplete information. In 2014, the county had 1,607 religious organizations, the third most out of all U.S. counties.

== Government and politics ==
County governments serve as agents of the state, with responsibilities defined in the Texas Constitution. Counties are governed by the commissioners' court. Each Texas county has four precinct commissioners and a county judge. Although this body is called a court, it conducts the general business of the county and oversees financial matters. The commissioners court may hire personnel to run major departments, such as health and human services.

Besides the county judge and commissioners, the other elective offices found in most counties include the county attorney, county and district clerks, county treasurer, sheriff, tax assessor-collector, justices of the peace, and constables. As a part of the checks and balances system, counties have an auditor appointed by the district courts.

Harris County was one of the earliest areas of Texas to turn Republican. It voted Republican in all but one presidential election from 1952 to 2004, the lone break coming when native Texan Lyndon Johnson carried it in his 44-state landslide in 1964. In 2008, Barack Obama was the first Democrat to win the county since Texas native Lyndon Johnson in 1964. The city of Houston itself holds one of the highest concentrations of Democratic voters in the state, while suburban areas such as Cypress, Spring, and Katy in the county's western and northern areas, tend to be strongly Republican. In 2016, Hillary Clinton won the county by the largest margin for a Democrat since 1964. The Democratic Party performed very strongly in the county during the 2018 elections, as it did nationwide.

In 2020, Joe Biden won the county by 13%, the widest margin for a Democratic nominee since 1964. In 2024, Republican Donald Trump increased his vote share by 4 points to earn 46% to Kamala Harris's 51%, the closest margin since 2012. Though it has shifted towards Democrats in recent years, Harris County has nevertheless voted to the right of Dallas, Travis, Bexar, and El Paso, each of which has a smaller population.

In 2013, Allen Turner of the Houston Chronicle said that residents of Harris County were "consistently conservative in elections" and that they were, according to a Rice University Kinder Institute for Urban Research opinion poll, "surprisingly liberal on topics such as immigration, gun control and equal matrimonial rights for same-sex couples". Harris is regarded as a moderate or swing county in Texas, and has been a bellwether in presidential elections, voting for winners of every presidential election from 2000 through 2012 (both Barack Obama and Texas resident George W. Bush won the county twice).

As a result of the Obama sweep in 2008, many Democratic candidates in contests for lower-level offices also benefited, and many Republican incumbents were replaced by Democrats in the Harris County courthouse. Some of the defeated Republican district court judges were later re-appointed to vacant District Court benches by Governor Rick Perry. In 2018, Democrats swept the court capturing all 59 seats on the civil, criminal, family, juvenile and probate courts.

The Kinder Institute's Houston Survey in 2018 found that from 2014 through 2018 the number of Houston residents who supported adoption of children by same-sex couples climbed above 50% and remained there, while in 2017 over 56% of residents reported gay or lesbian persons among their circle of close personal friends. A 2013 opinion poll had found that 46% of Harris County residents supported same-sex marriage, up from 37% in 2001. Just above 82% favored offering illegal immigrants a path to citizenship provided they speak English and have no criminal record, holding from 83% in 2013, which was up from 19% in 2009. In 2013, 87% supported background checks for all firearms, the latest year that question was included in the Kinder Houston Survey. This measure has moved up steadily from 60% in 1985 to 69% in 2000.

United States presidential election results for Harris County, Texas
Year	Republican		Democratic		Third party(ies)	
Year	No.	%	No.	%	No.	%
1912	726	8.01%	6,409	70.69%	1,931	21.30%
1916	3,009	22.05%	10,131	74.24%	507	3.72%
1920	7,735	26.82%	14,808	51.35%	6,294	21.83%
1924	8,953	27.57%	20,648	63.57%	2,878	8.86%
1928	27,188	55.70%	21,536	44.12%	86	0.18%
1932	8,604	15.37%	46,886	83.77%	480	0.86%
1936	8,083	11.97%	59,205	87.67%	245	0.36%
1940	20,797	22.02%	73,520	77.84%	136	0.14%
1944	11,843	11.37%	71,077	68.27%	21,199	20.36%
1948	43,117	35.16%	58,488	47.70%	21,012	17.14%
1952	146,665	57.63%	107,604	42.28%	228	0.09%
1956	155,555	61.11%	93,961	36.91%	5,033	1.98%
1960	168,170	51.68%	148,275	45.57%	8,954	2.75%
1964	154,401	40.32%	227,819	59.49%	765	0.20%
1968	202,079	42.90%	182,546	38.75%	86,412	18.35%
1972	365,672	62.56%	215,916	36.94%	2,943	0.50%
1976	357,536	52.17%	321,897	46.97%	5,831	0.85%
1980	416,655	57.87%	274,061	38.06%	29,298	4.07%
1984	536,029	61.46%	334,135	38.31%	2,003	0.23%
1988	464,217	57.02%	342,919	42.12%	7,024	0.86%
1992	406,778	43.14%	360,171	38.20%	175,998	18.66%
1996	421,462	49.24%	386,726	45.18%	47,705	5.57%
2000	529,159	54.28%	418,267	42.91%	27,396	2.81%
2004	584,723	54.75%	475,865	44.56%	7,380	0.69%
2008	571,883	48.82%	590,982	50.45%	8,607	0.73%
2012	586,073	49.31%	587,044	49.39%	15,468	1.30%
2016	545,955	41.61%	707,914	53.95%	58,243	4.44%
2020	700,630	42.69%	918,193	55.94%	22,434	1.37%
2024	722,695	46.40%	808,771	51.93%	26,018	1.67%

United States Senate election results for Harris County, Texas
Year	Republican		Democratic		Third party(ies)	
Year	No.	%	No.	%	No.	%
2024	666,027	43.00%	841,784	54.35%	41,103	2.65%

United States Senate election results for Harris County, Texas2
Year	Republican		Democratic		Third party(ies)	
Year	No.	%	No.	%	No.	%
2020	718,228	44.49%	854,158	52.90%	42,139	2.61%
2026	452,865	32.64%	910,177	65.60%	24,479	1.76%

Texas Gubernatorial election results for Harris County
Year	Republican		Democratic		Third party(ies)	
Year	No.	%	No.	%	No.	%
2022	490,261	44.47%	595,653	54.03%	16,504	1.50%
2026	484,994	34.95%	881,448	63.52%	21,122	1.52%

=== County facilities ===
The 1910 county courthouse was renovated in the 1950s to update its systems. In the 21st century, the facility received another major renovation. Completed in 2011, the $50 million, eight-year project was designed to restore notable historic aspects of the courthouse while providing for contemporary communication and building needs.

The Texas First Court of Appeals and the Texas Fourteenth Court of Appeals, since September 3, 2010, are located in the 1910 Harris County courthouse. Previously they were located on the campus of the South Texas College of Law.

The Harris County Jail Complex of the Harris County Sheriff's Office (HCSO) is the largest in Texas, and one of the largest in the nation. In July 2012, the facility held 9,113 prisoners. To handle overcrowding in the facility, the county had to ship inmates to other counties and some are housed out of the state. There are three juvenile facilities operated by the county. The Juvenile Detention Center (JDC) is in Downtown Houston. The Harris County Youth Village is in Pasadena, though its postal address uses the city name "Seabrook, TX". Harris County Leadership Academy (HCLA) is in an unincorporated area in western Harris County, and has a Katy post office address.

The county has a potter's field, the Harris County Cemetery on Oates Road in Houston, which previously had housing for elderly people. It has 18 acres (7.3 ha) of land. It was established in 1921 on property taken from police officers who had acted corruptly. The county paid $80,000 for 100 acres (40 ha) of land, then put in the Harris County Home For the Aged, a poor farm for elderly people of all races which had a capacity of 100; the poor farm opened in 1922. Around that time, the county cemetery was also established there. The Harris County Commissioners closed the poor farm in August 1958. In 2014, no more burials were allowed to occur at the Oates Road facility due to overcapacity.

By 2013 the county was building a second potter's field due to overcapacity at the first. Harris County Eastgate Cemetery had started operations in 2014. It is near the Crosby census-designated place and has a Crosby postal address.

The county had a poor farm in what is now West University Place that closed in 1923. The county cemetery was formerly there; the bodies were transferred to the new property.

=== County government ===
==== Harris County elected officials ====
Position	Name	Party
County Judge	Lina Hidalgo	Democratic
District Attorney	Sean Teare	Democratic
County Attorney	Abbie Kamin	Democratic
District Clerk	Marilyn Burgess	Democratic
County Clerk	Teneshia Hudspeth	Democratic
Tax Assessor-Collector	Annette Ramirez	Democratic
Treasurer	Carla Wyatt	Democratic
Sheriff	Ed Gonzalez	Democratic
Commissioner, Precinct 1	Rodney Ellis	Democratic
Commissioner, Precinct 2	Adrian Garcia	Democratic
Commissioner, Precinct 3	Tom Ramsey	Republican
Commissioner, Precinct 4	Lesley Briones	Democratic
School Trustee, At-Large, Pos. 3	Richard Cantu	Democratic
School Trustee, At-Large, Pos. 5	Erica Davis	Democratic
School Trustee, At-Large, Pos. 7	David W. Brown	Democratic
School Trustee, Pct. 1, Pos. 6	Danyahel "Danny" Norris	Democratic
School Trustee, Pct. 2, Pos. 1	Amy Hinojosa	Democratic
School Trustee, Pct. 3, Pos. 4	Andrea Duhon	Democratic
School Trustee, Pct. 4, Pos. 2	Eric Dick	Republican
Constable, Precinct 1	Alan Rosen	Democratic
Constable, Precinct 2	Jerry Garcia	Democratic
Constable, Precinct 3	Sherman Eagleton	Democratic
Constable, Precinct 4	Mark Herman	Republican
Constable, Precinct 5	Terry Allbritton	Republican
Constable, Precinct 6	Silvia Trevino	Democratic
Constable, Precinct 7	May Walker	Democratic
Constable, Precinct 8	Phil Sandlin	Republican

=== Courts ===
There are 67 District Courts — 24 Civil, 29 Criminal, 11 Family, and 3 Juvenile — in Harris County; each District Court is randomly assigned cases within their specialization from across Harris County. District court judges are elected countywide to serve 4 year terms. In addition to the 67 presiding judges, there are 20 Associate Judges.

==== Criminal District Courts ====
Office	Name	Party
174th District Court	Hazel B. Jones	Democratic
176th District Court	Nikita V. Harmon	Democratic
177th District Court	Emily Detoto	Republican
178th District Court	Kelli Johnson	Democratic
179th District Court	Ana Martinez	Democratic
180th District Court	Tami Pierce	Republican
182nd District Court	Danilo Lacayo	Democratic
183rd District Court	Lance G. Long	Republican
184th District Court	Katherine N. Thomas	Democratic
185th District Court	Andrea Beall	Democratic
208th District Court	Beverly D. Armstrong	Democratic
209th District Court	Brian E. Warren	Democratic
228th District Court	Caroline Dozier	Republican
230th District Court	Chris Morton	Democratic
232nd District Court	Josh Hill	Democratic
248th District Court	Hilary Unger	Democratic
262nd District Court	Lori Chambers Gray	Democratic
263rd District Court	Melissa M. Morris	Democratic
337th District Court	Colleen Gaido	Democratic
338th District Court	Michele Oncken	Republican
339th District Court	Te'iva J. Bell	Democratic
351st District Court	Natalia "Nata" Cornelio	Democratic
482nd District Court	Veronica M. Nelson	Democratic
486th District Court	Aaron Burdette	Republican
487th District Court	Stacey Barrow	Democratic
488th District Court	Matthew Peneguy	Republican
495th District Court	Lori DeAngelo	Republican
496th District Court	Dan Simons	Republican
497th District Court	Peyton Peebles	Republican

==== Juvenile District Courts ====
Office	Name	Party
313th District Court	Natalia Cokinos Oakes	Democratic
314th District Court	Michelle Moore	Democratic
315th District Court	Leah Shapiro	Democratic

=== United States Congress ===
Representatives	Name	Party	First elected	Area(s) of Harris County represented
District 2	Dan Crenshaw	Republican	2018	Atascosita, Huffman, Humble, Kingwood, Spring
District 8	Morgan Luttrell	Republican	2022	Parts of Cypress and Katy, Waller
District 7	Lizzie Fletcher	Democratic	2018	West Houston, Memorial Villages, Bellaire, West University Place, west and northwest areas of county
District 9	Al Green	Democratic	2004	Alief, Southwest Houston, Houston's Southside
District 18	Christian Menefee	Democratic	2026	Downtown Houston, Bush IAH, northwest and northeast Houston, inner portions of Houston's Southside
District 22	Troy Nehls	Republican	2020	Ellington Field, Katy
District 29	Sylvia Garcia	Democratic	2018	Aldine, Channelview, East Houston, Fall Creek portion of Humble, Galena Park, Jacinto City, northern Pasadena, North Shore, western Sheldon, South Houston
District 36	Brian Babin	Republican	2014	Clear Lake City, NASA Johnson Space Center, southern and central Pasadena, Deer Park, Baytown, Crosby, La Porte, eastern Sheldon, Dayton, Seabrook, Morgan's Point, Shore Acres, El Lago, Nassau Bay, Taylor Lake Village
District 38	Wesley Hunt	Republican	2022	Jersey Village, Cypress, Tomball, Katy, and Klein

=== Texas Legislature ===
==== Texas Senate ====
District	Name	Party	First elected	Area(s) of Harris County represented
4	Brett Ligon	Republican	2026	Kingwood, far eastern portions of Baytown
6	Carol Alvarado	Democratic	2013	Houston Ship Channel, eastern portions of Houston, Jacinto City, Galena Park, northern Pasadena, western portion of Baytown
7	Paul Bettencourt	Republican	2014	Memorial Villages, Memorial/Spring Branch area, Addicks Reservoir, northwest portions of county
11	Mayes Middleton	Republican	2022	Southeast
13	Borris Miles	Democratic	2016	Downtown Houston, Texas Medical Center, southwest and northeast Houston, Houston's Southside
15	Molly Cook	Democratic	2024	Northwest Houston, Bush IAH, southern portion of Humble, eastern Harris County
17	Joan Huffman	Republican	2008	Meyerland, Bellaire, West University Place, much of Greater Katy area, far west Houston, Barker Reservoir

==== Texas House of Representatives ====
District	Name	Party	First elected	Area(s) of Harris County represented
126	Sam Harless	Republican	2018	Champions/FM 1960 area
127	Charles Cunningham	Republican	2022	Humble, Kingwood, Lake Houston, Atascocita, Crosby, Wallisville
128	Briscoe Cain	Republican	2016	Baytown, Deer Park, La Porte
129	Dennis Paul	Republican	2014	Clear Lake City, NASA Johnson Space Center, Southeast Harris County (including Seabrook and Webster)
130	Tom Oliverson	Republican	2016	Northwest Harris County (including Cypress, Tomball, Waller)
131	Alma Allen	Democratic	2004	far Southwest Houston and far South Side
132	Mike Schofield	Republican	2020	West Harris County (including Greater Katy area)
133	Mano DeAyala	Republican	2022	West Houston along West Sam Houston Tollway, including western portion of Memorial/Spring Branch and part of the Energy Corridor
134	Ann Johnson	Democratic	2020	Inner western portions of Houston (including Meyerland, River Oaks and Memorial Park), Texas Medical Center, West University Place, Bellaire, Southside Place, Western Montrose
135	Jon Rosenthal	Democratic	2018	Jersey Village and southeastern segments of the Champions/FM 1960 area
137	Gene Wu	Democratic	2013	Southwest Houston (including Sharpstown and Gulfton)
138	Lacey Hull	Republican	2020	Northwest Houston and parts of the Memorial/Spring Branch area north of I-10, Addicks Reservoir
139	Charlene Ward Johnson	Democratic	2024	North Houston and Aldine west of I-45
140	Armando Walle	Democratic	2008	North Houston and Aldine east of I-45
141	Senfronia Thompson	Democratic	1972	Northeast Houston, Bush IAH, Greenspoint, southern portion of Humble
142	Harold Dutton, Jr.	Democratic	1984	East Houston and Northshore area
143	Ana Hernandez Luna	Democratic	2006	East Houston within Loop 610, Houston Ship Channel, Galena Park, Jacinto City, northern Pasadena
144	Mary Ann Perez	Democratic	2016	Southern Pasadena, far southeast Houston
145	Christina Morales	Democratic	2019	Inner southeastern portions of Houston (mainly east of I-45), South Houston (not part of the city of Houston)
146	Lauren Ashley Simmons	Democratic	2024	Inner portions of Houston's South Side
147	Jolanda Jones	Democratic	2022	Downtown Houston, inner southeastern portions of Houston (mainly west of I-45), Eastern Montrose, Midtown, Third Ward
148	Penny Shaw	Democratic	2020	North and Northwest Houston mainly within Loop 610 (including Houston Heights)
149	Hubert Vo	Democratic	2004	Far west Houston, Alief, unincorporated portions of Katy area east of Fry Rd, Barker Reservoir
150	Valoree Swanson	Republican	2016	North Harris County (including Spring and Klein)

The county has an elections administrator and elections office, which was non-partisan but under the oversight of Democrat Lina Hidalgo, the Harris County Judge. The State of Texas Legislature passed a law, SB 1750, that asks for the position to be abolished effective September 2023, as the law states that any county with at least 3,500,000 persons should have elections done by the clerk and tax assessor-collector; of all Texas counties, only Harris would be affected. This was done following failings in the 2022 election, as confirmed by the investigation initiated by Harris County District Attorney Kim Ogg's office. In August 2023, Karin Crump, the presiding judge of the 250th civil district court of Travis County, stated that this went against the Texas Constitution, citing how the law only affected one county. Crump's ruling was overturned by the Texas Supreme Court.

==== County services ====
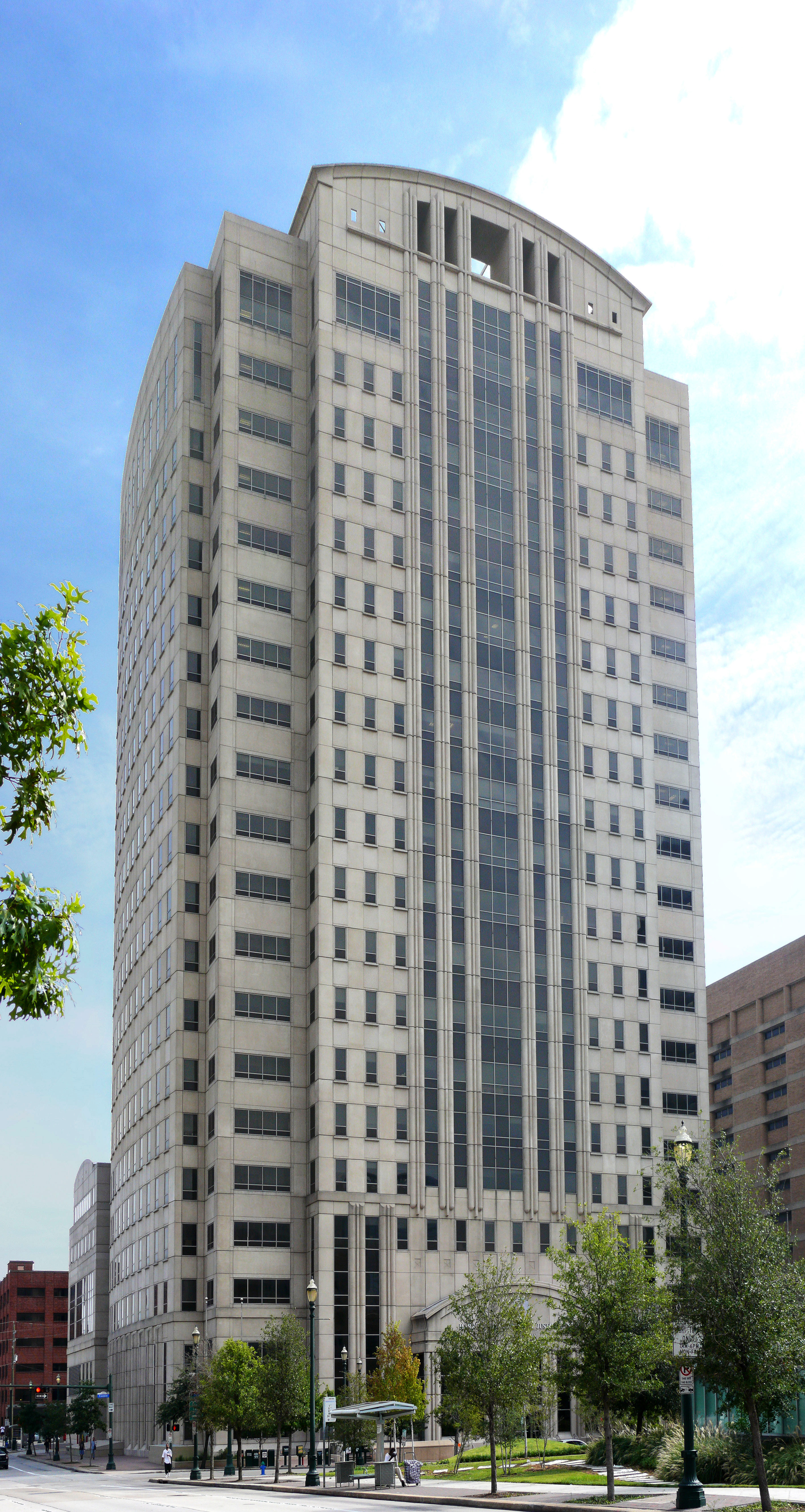
Harris County Criminal Courts Building

The Harris County Flood Control District manages the effects of flooding in the county.

The Harris County Sheriff's Office operates jail facilities and is the primary provider of law enforcement services to the unincorporated areas of the county. The sheriff is the conservator of the peace in the county. The Harris County jail facilities are in northern downtown on the north side of the Buffalo Bayou. The 1200 Jail, the 1307 Jail, (originally a TDCJ facility, leased by the county), and the 701 Jail (formed from existing warehouse storage space) are on the same site.

The Community Services Department provides community services. The department maintains the 20 acres (8.1 ha) Oates Road Cemetery (also known as the Harris County Cemetery) for indigents in eastern Houston, near the former Southern Bible College. In March 2010, the county adopted a cremation first policy, meaning that the default preference for most indigents is to have them cremated instead of buried. As of 2010, the county authorized the Community Services Department to purchase about 50 acres (20 ha) of land in the Huffman area so the county will have additional spaces for indigent burials.

The Harris County Housing Authority (HCHA) is a governmental nonprofit corporation which addresses the need for quality affordable housing. The HCHA has been recognized by the U.S. Department of Housing and Urban Development as the highest performing housing authority in the region and was named one of America's 10 best Public Housing Authorities. Guy R. Rankin, IV is chief executive officer of Harris County Housing Authority (HCHA).

=== State government ===
The Texas Department of Criminal Justice operates some correctional facilities in Harris County, including:

- Kegans Unit, located in Downtown Houston, is a state jail for men. It is in the north of downtown along the north side of the Buffalo Bayou, next to the county facilities.
- Pam Lychner Unit, named after Pam Lychner and located in unincorporated northeast Harris County, east of the city of Humble, is a state jail for men.

As of 2001, Kegans and Lychner serves male state jail offenders from Harris County, with Kegans getting lower-risk offenders and Lychner getting higher-risk and special-needs offenders. If both of the male state jails in Harris County are full, excess offenders go to the Gist Unit in Jefferson County. Female state jail offenders from Harris County go to the Plane Unit in Liberty County.

The South Texas Intermediate Sanction Facility Unit, a parole confinement facility for males operated by Global Expertise in Outsourcing, is in downtown Houston, west of Daikin Park.

=== Law enforcement ===
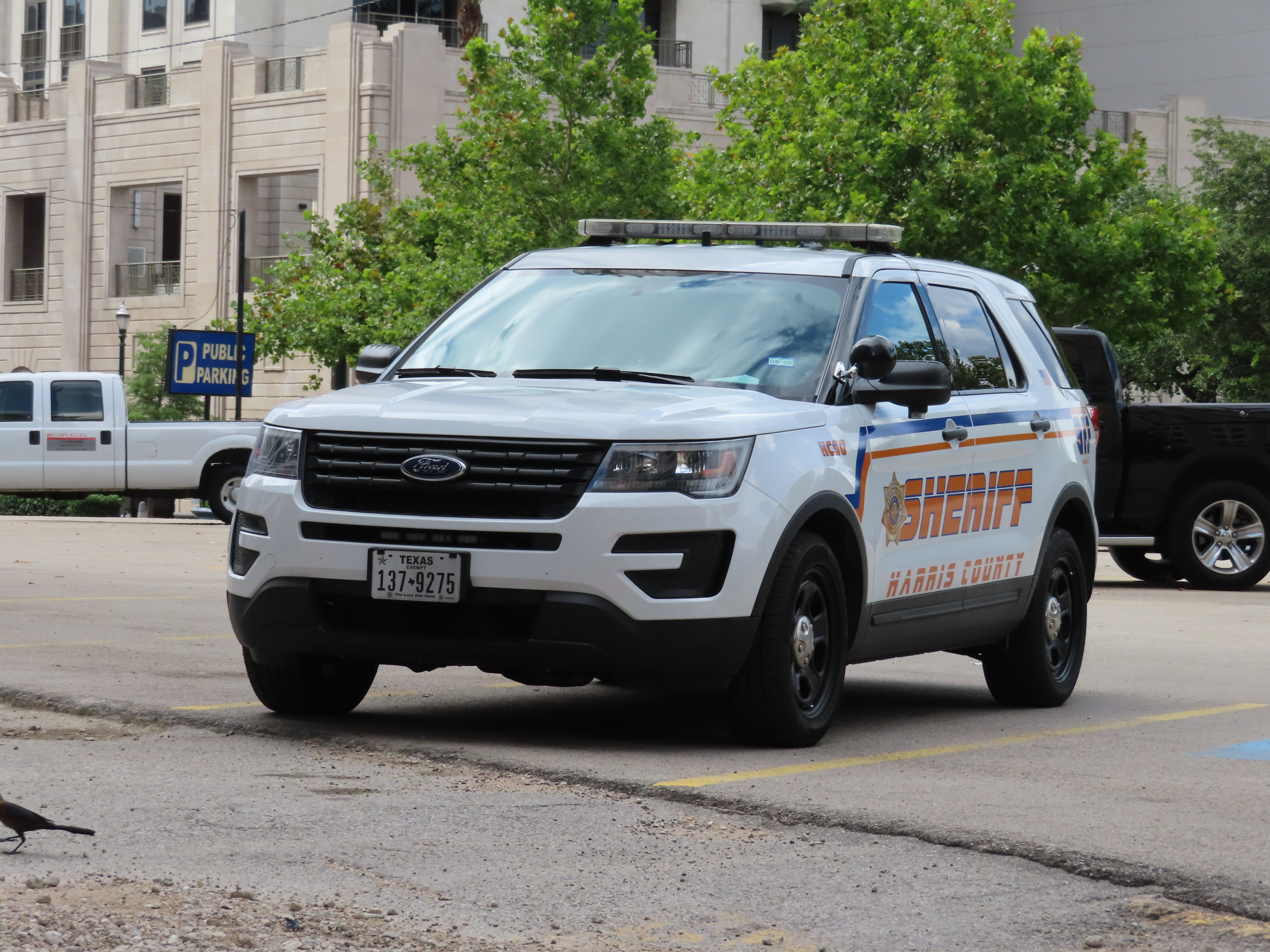
Harris County Sheriff Ford Police Interceptor

As of 2018 there are over 60 law enforcement agencies operating in the county. They include: the Harris County Sheriff's Office, the Harris County Constable Office, the Houston Police Department, METRO Police Department, other municipal police departments, and school district police departments.

The combined yearly sum spent by these agencies circa 2018 was $1.6 billion. That year the Rice University Kinder Institute for Urban Research released a report advocating for consolidating several of these agencies as a way of saving taxpayer money.

== Administration ==
The chief administrative officer of a Texas County, as set up in the Texas Constitution, is the County Judge, who sits as the chair of the county's Commissioners' Court (the equivalent of a Board of Supervisors in some other states). In 2019, Judge Lina Hidalgo was sworn in as the County Judge. The county is split into four geographical divisions called precincts. Each precinct elects a Commissioner to represent them on the commissioners court and oversee county government functions in the precinct.

Other elected positions in Harris County include a County Attorney, a County Clerk, a District Attorney, a District Clerk, a Sheriff, eight Constables, a Tax Assessor-Collector, a County Treasurer, and every judge in the county except municipal judges, who are appointed by the mayors and confirmed by city councils of their respective cities.

Many of the organs of the Harris County government reside in the Harris County Campus in Downtown Houston.

== Economy ==
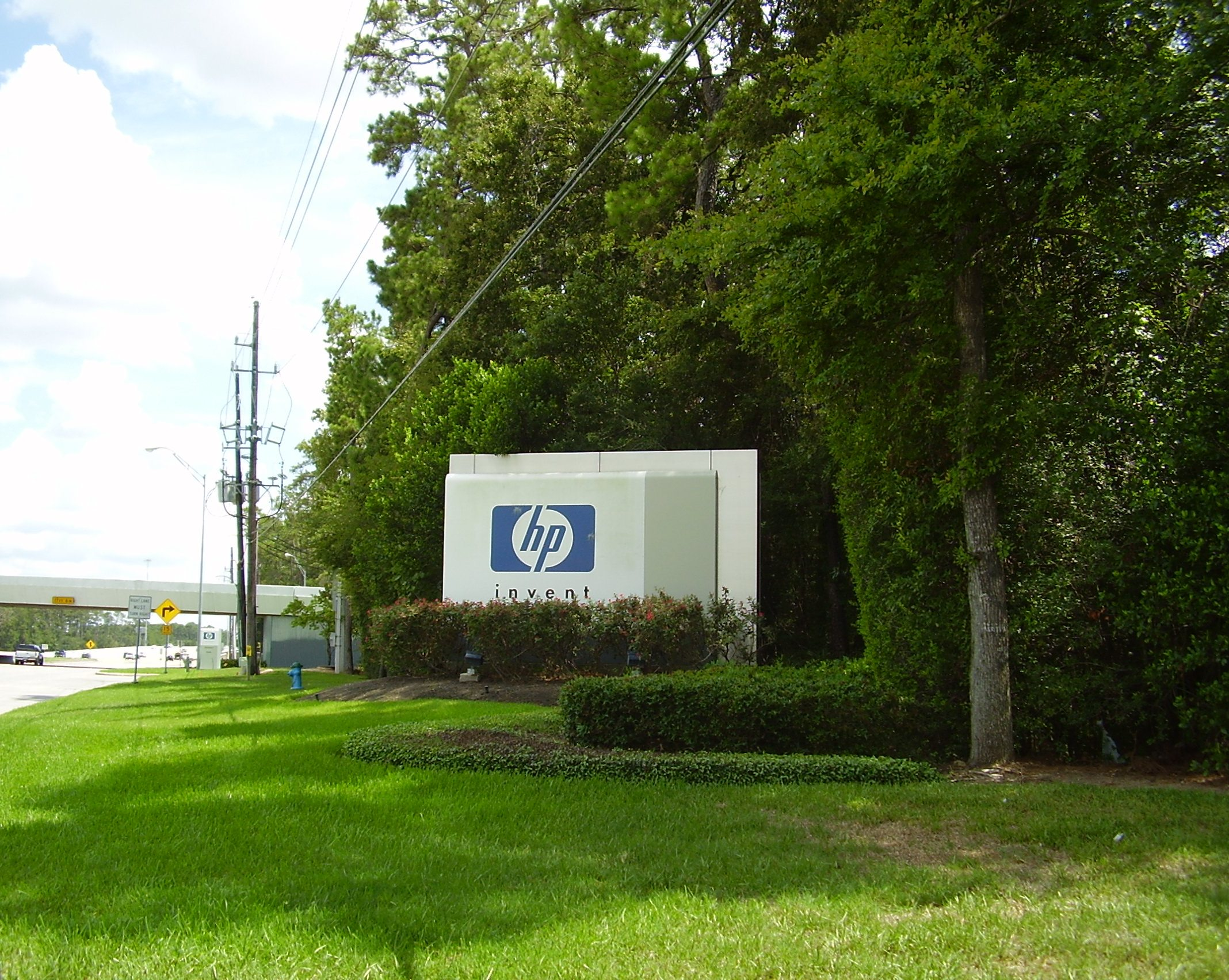
Hewlett-Packard United States offices, formerly headquarters of Compaq

In 2000, the largest employers in Harris County were Administaff, Compaq, Continental Airlines, Memorial Hermann Healthcare System, and Southwestern Bell.

The University of Houston System's annual impact on the Houston-area's economy as of 2011 equates to that of a major corporation: $1.1 billion in new funds attracted annually to the Houston area, $3.13 billion in total economic benefit, and 24,000 local jobs generated. This is in addition to the over 12,500 new graduates the UH System produces every year who enter the workforce in Houston and throughout Texas. These degree-holders tend to stay in Houston; after five years, 80.5% of graduates are still living and working in the region.

In 2009, 20% of the office space in northwest Harris County was vacant. As of that year, more office space was being built; in 2010, northwest Harris will have twice the amount of office space that it had in 2009. The vacancy rate in the area near Farm to Market Road 1960 and Texas State Highway 249 in north Harris County was 53% in 2009.

Various companies are headquartered in incorporated and unincorporated areas throughout Harris County.

Academy Sports and Outdoors, a sporting goods retailer, has its corporate offices and product distribution center in unincorporated western Harris County. Hewlett-Packard formerly operated its United States region office in a complex northwest unincorporated Harris County; the complex formerly belonged to Compaq prior to Compaq's merger with HP. The HP offices, which are now occupied by Hewlett Packard Enterprise, are now in a limited purpose annexation in Houston. Smith International has its headquarters in the Greenspoint district and in an unincorporated area in Harris County. BJ Services Company has its headquarters in the Spring Branch district and in unincorporated Harris County. Cybersoft Technologies has its headquarters in an unincorporated area. In 2012, Noble Energy announced that it was consolidating its headquarters and two other Greater Houston offices into a 10-story building on the former Compaq headquarters property in unincorporated Harris County. In 2022, ExxonMobil announced it was moving its headquarters to Harris County from Irving, Texas. Goya Foods previously had its Texas offices in an unincorporated area in the county.

General Electric operates an aeroderivative division facility on Jacintoport in unincorporated Harris County. Randall's Food Markets, a subsidiary of Safeway Inc., has its distribution center in unincorporated Harris County.

In 2008, KBR announced that it will open a new office facility in an unincorporated area in western Harris County. In December KBR said that it would not continue with the plans due to a weakened economy. In January 2009 KBR announced that it will not open the new office facility.

== Education ==
=== Primary and secondary schools ===
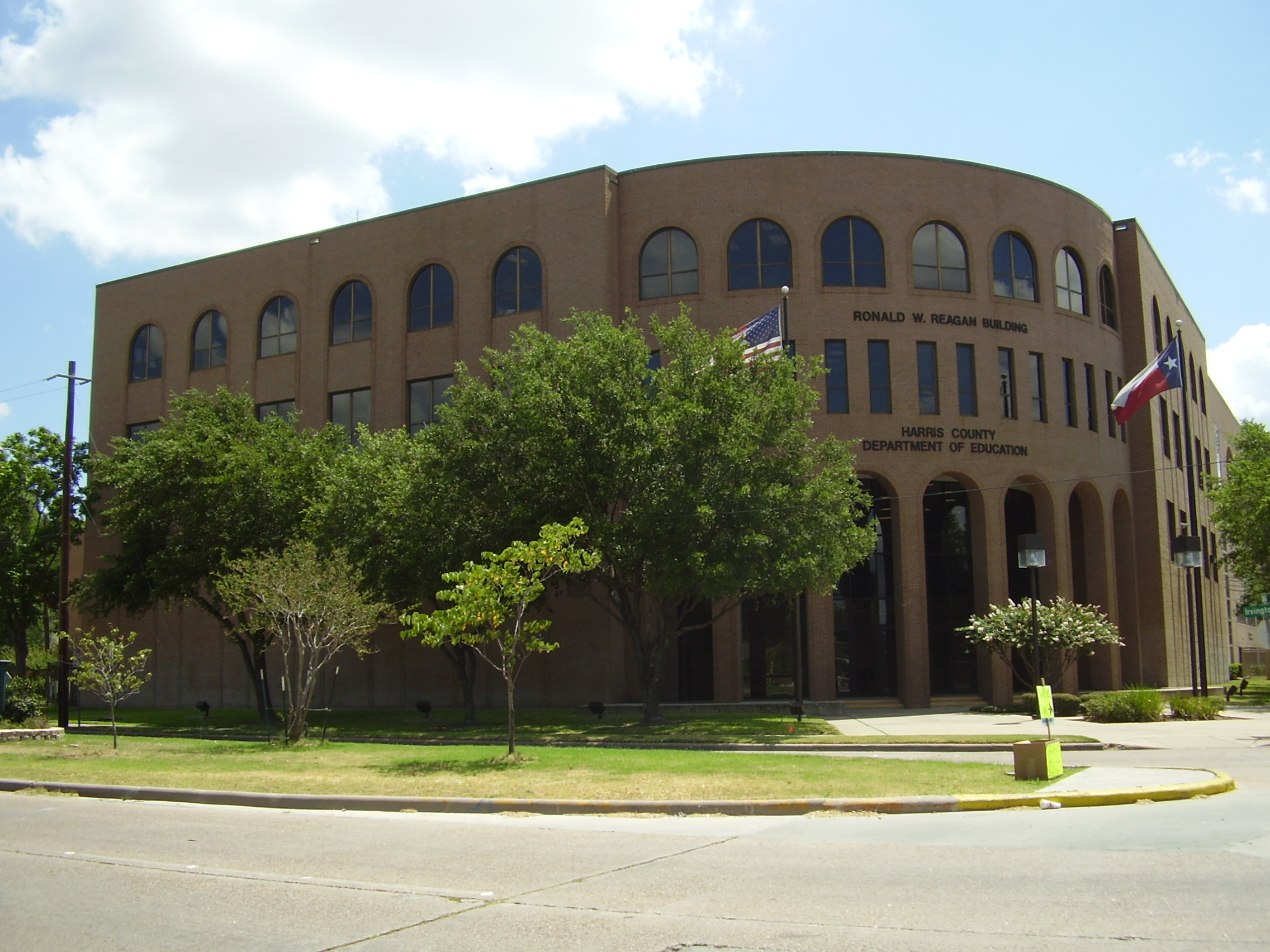
Harris County Department of Education – Ronald W. Reagan Building

The Harris County Department of Education, a county division overseeing education by local school districts, with a 2011 budget around $100 million, is headquartered in the Ronald W. Reagan Building in the Northside district in Houston. It has an Adult Education Center in the Northside and an office in the North Post Oak Building in Spring Branch.

Several school districts serve Harris County communities. Among the 26 districts are:

- Aldine ISD
- Alief ISD
- Channelview ISD
- Clear Creek ISD
- Crosby ISD
- Cypress-Fairbanks ISD
- Dayton ISD
- Deer Park ISD
- Galena Park ISD
- Goose Creek CISD
- Houston ISD
- Huffman ISD
- Humble ISD
- Katy ISD
- Klein ISD
- La Porte ISD
- New Caney ISD
- Pasadena ISD
- Pearland ISD
- Sheldon ISD
- Spring ISD
- Spring Branch ISD
- Stafford MSD
- Tomball ISD
- Waller ISD

On July 1, 2013, the North Forest Independent School District closed and its territory became a part of Houston ISD.

In addition, state-operated charter schools are in the county. Charter schools in unincorporated areas include:

- Jamie's House Charter School (6–12)
- Richard Milburn Academy Houston (high school) – Of Milburn Schools
- YES Prep North Central of YES Prep Public Schools

The department of education of the county operates the Highpoint Schools.

=== Colleges and universities ===
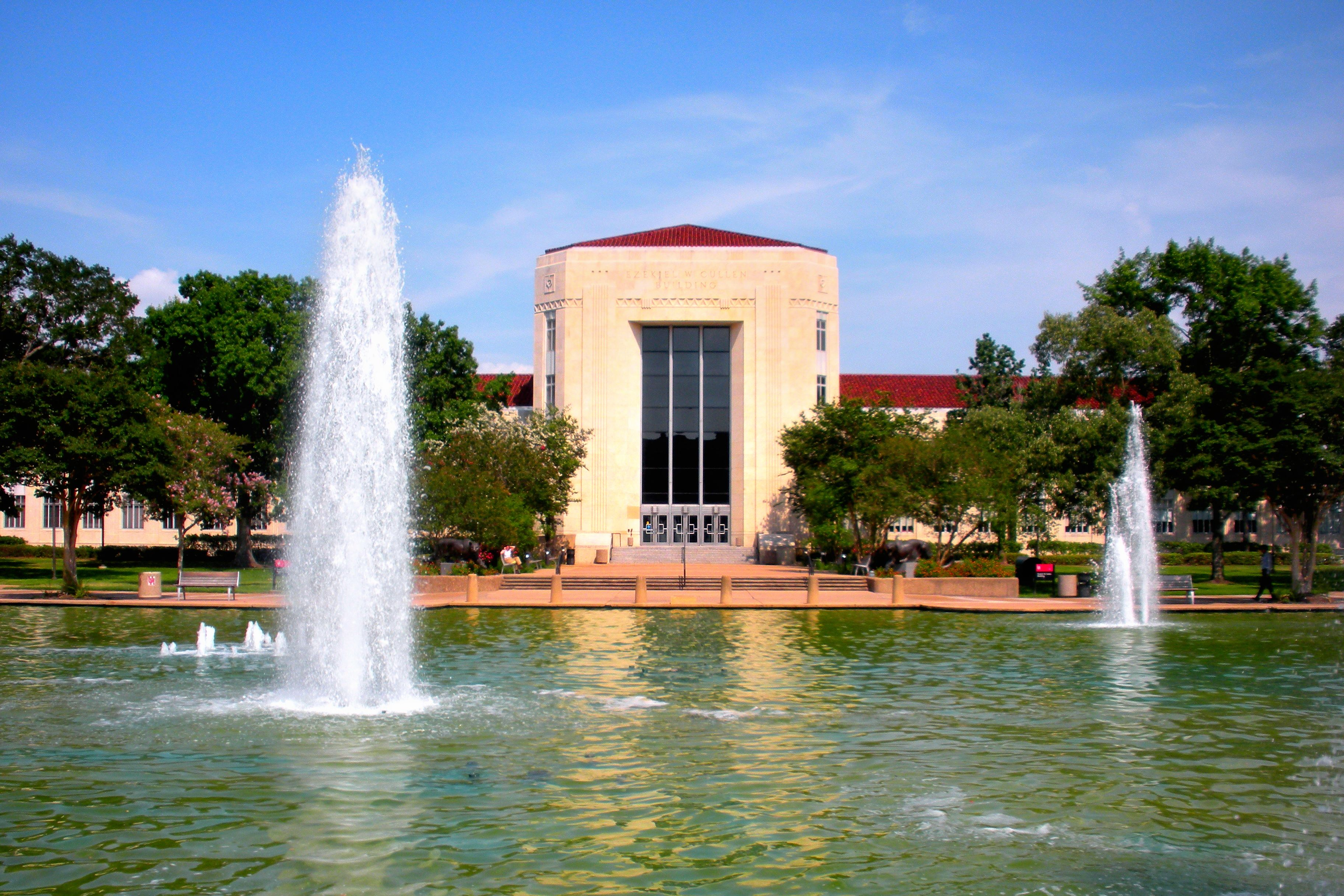
Ezekiel W. Cullen Building at the University of Houston

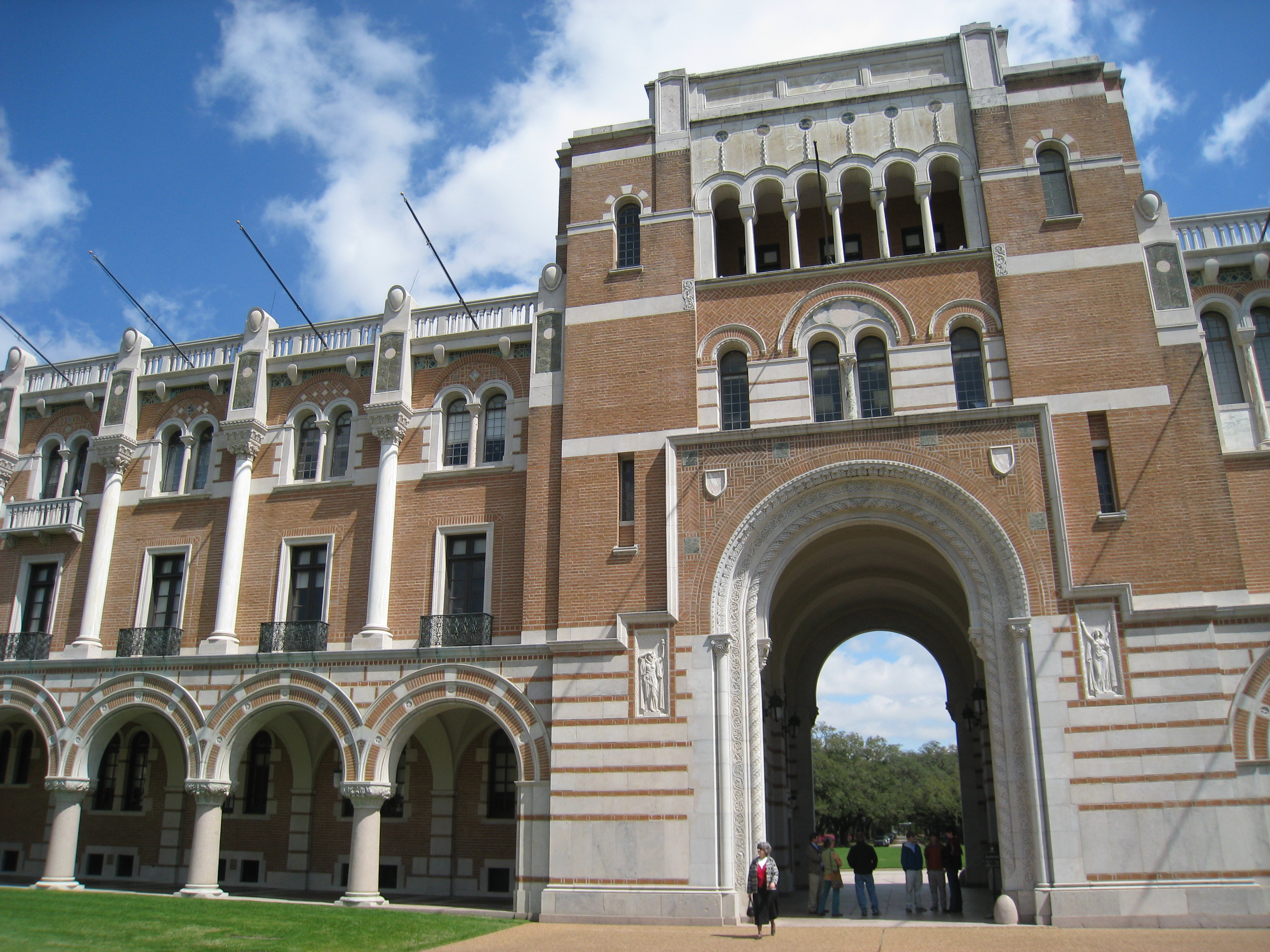
Rice University - Sally Port

Four separate and distinct state universities are located in Harris County. The University of Houston is a nationally recognized Tier One research university, and is the flagship institution of the University of Houston System. The third-largest university in Texas, the University of Houston counted 43,774 (fall 2016) students on its 667-acre campus in southeast Houston. The University of Houston–Clear Lake and the University of Houston–Downtown are stand-alone universities; they are not branch campuses of the University of Houston. Located in the historic community of Third Ward is Texas Southern University, one of the largest historically black colleges and universities in the United States.

Several private institutions of higher learning—ranging from liberal arts colleges to a nationally recognized research university—are located within Harris County. Rice University is one of the leading teaching and research universities of the United States and ranked the nation's 17th best overall university by U.S. News & World Report.

Five community college districts exist with campuses in and around Harris County:

- The Houston Community College System serves Houston ISD (including the former North Forest ISD), Katy ISD, Spring Branch ISD, Alief ISD, and Stafford MSD. This includes most of the City of Houston.
- The Lone Star College System (formerly North-Harris Montgomery Community College District) serves Aldine ISD, Cypress-Fairbanks ISD, Tomball ISD, Humble ISD, and Klein ISD. This constitutes the northwestern through northeastern parts of the county.
- San Jacinto College serves Pasadena ISD, Galena Park ISD, Sheldon ISD, Channelview ISD, Deer Park ISD, La Porte ISD, and the Harris County part of Clear Creek ISD. This constitutes southeastern and eastern portions of the county
- Lee College serves Goose Creek ISD, Crosby ISD, and Huffman ISD, far east to northeast sections
- Blinn College is the community college for portions of Waller ISD in Harris County, far northwestern parts.

The Houston Community College and Lone Star College systems are within the 10 largest institutions of higher learning in the United States.

=== Public libraries ===
Harris County operates its own public library system, the Harris County Public Library.

In addition, Houston has the Houston Public Library, a city-controlled public library system.

The cities of Baytown, Bellaire, Deer Park, and Pasadena have their own city-controlled libraries.

== Emergency services ==
=== Police services ===
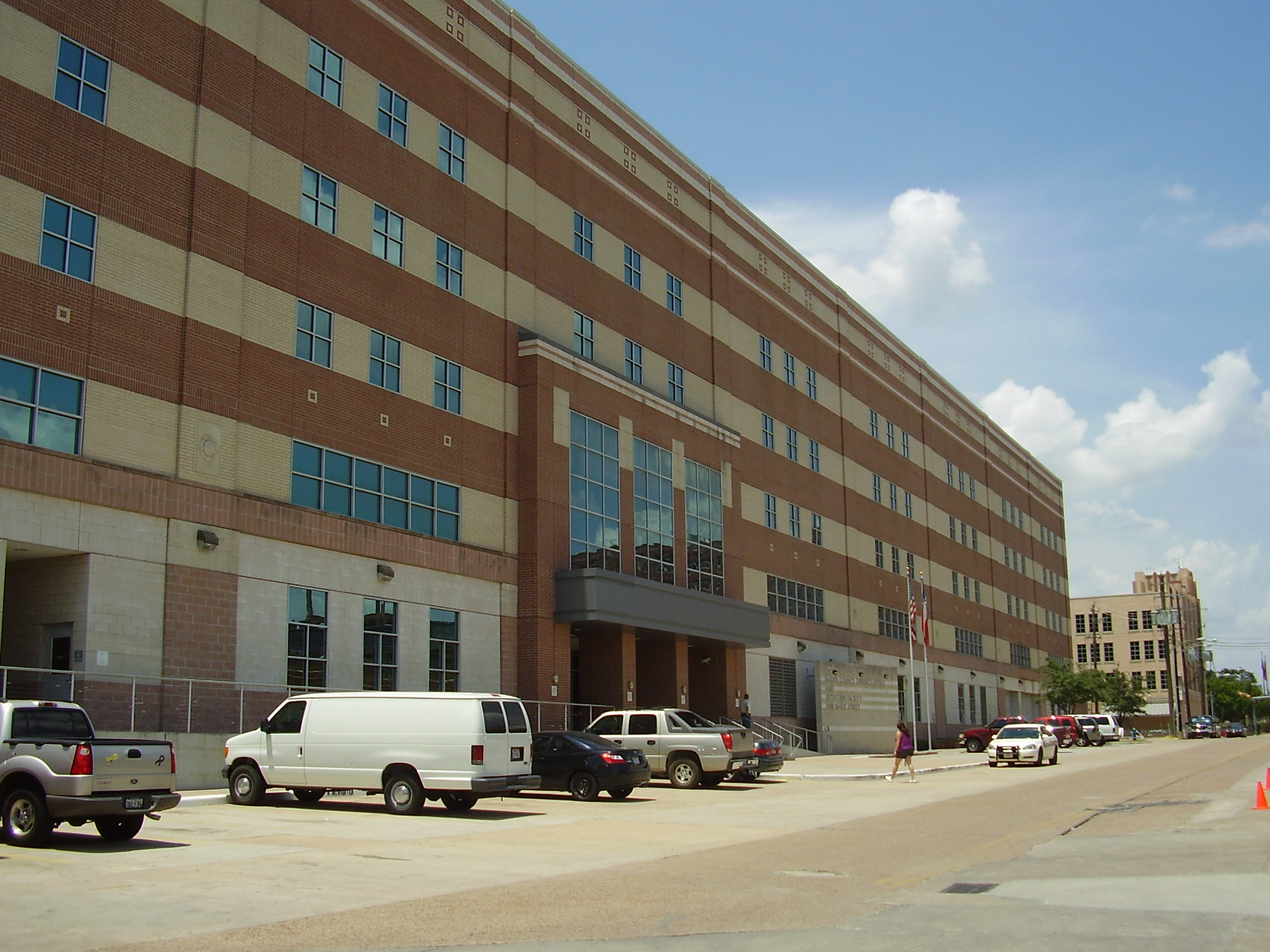
The 1200 Jail, the headquarters of the Harris County Sheriff's Office

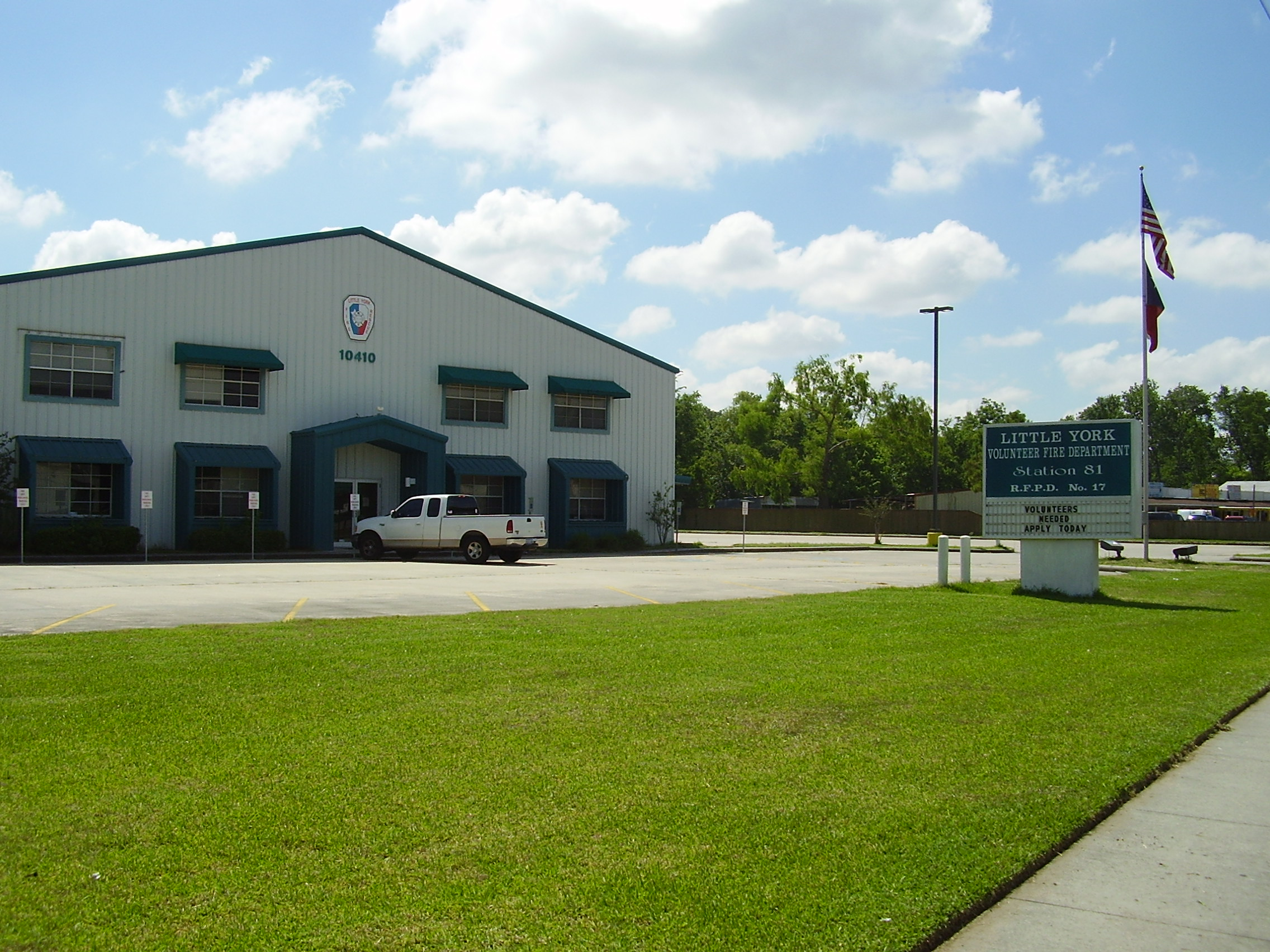
Little York Volunteer Fire Department Station 81

Incorporated cities operate their own police departments, though Harris County operates the Harris County Sheriff's Office, which serves unincorporated areas and supplements police forces of incorporated areas.

Harris County also has a constable for each of its eight precincts and hundreds of deputies assigned to each. They mainly serve in a patrol function, established to maintain peace in the county as well as providing security to county buildings such as court houses and district attorney's offices.

=== Municipal fire/EMS services ===
The Harris County Fire Marshal's Office operates an Investigative Branch, an Emergency Response Branch (Hazardous Materials Response) and Prevention Branch (Inspections). The office is headquartered at 2318 Atascocita Road in an unincorporated area. Incorporated cities operate their own fire departments. The city of Houston operates the Houston Fire Department which provides fire and emergency medical coverage to the city of Houston.

=== Emergency services districts ===
Areas outside of municipal city limits (and some smaller municipalities) have fire and emergency medical services provided by Emergency Service Districts, distinct governmental units with the ability to levy property and sales taxes. ESD's may provide fire service, EMS service or both (dual services) and the services they provide determine the limits on their adoptable tax rate.

ESD's may provide services directly or may contract with an agency or agencies for services. ESD's may overlap one another to ensure both fire and EMS services are provided.

ESD	Type	Provider	Sales Tax Rate (2015)	Property Tax Rate per $100 Valuation (2015)
Harris County ESD #1	EMS	Harris County Emergency Corps		.10
Harris County ESD #2	EMS	South Lake Houston EMS	1%	.0280120
Harris County ESD #4 (4A)	Dual	Huffman FD	1% (2%)	.10 (.10)
Harris County ESD #5	EMS	HCESD5 EMS	1%	.02
Harris County ESD #6	EMS	North Channel EMS	.5%	.0089
Harris County ESD #7	Fire	Spring VFD	1%	.06545
Harris County ESD #8	EMS	Northwest EMS		.10
Harris County ESD #9	Dual	Cy-Fair FD	1%	.055
Harris County ESD #10	Fire	Eastex Fire Department	1%	.10
Harris County ESD #11	EMS	https://esd11.com/		.04185
Harris County ESD #12	Fire	Cloverleaf Fire Department	.5%	.03
Harris County ESD #13	Fire	Cypress Creek FD		.08826
Harris County ESD #14	Dual	Highlands VFD	2%	.05
Harris County ESD #15	Fire	Tomball FD	1%	.05
Harris County ESD #16	Fire	Klein VFD	1%	.05
Harris County ESD #17	Fire	Little York VFD	1%	.10
Harris County ESD #19	Fire	Sheldon VFD		.03
Harris County ESD #20	Fire	Northwest FD	1%	.10
Harris County ESD #21	Dual	Rosehill FD	1%	.10
Harris County ESD #24	Fire	Aldine Fire & Rescue		.10
Harris County ESD #25	Fire	Westfield FD		.10
Harris County ESD #28	Fire	Ponderosa VFD	1%	.10
Harris County ESD #29	Fire	Champions FD	1%	.09032
Harris County ESD #46	Dual	Atascocita VFD	1%	.08
Harris County ESD #47	Dual	Westlake FD	1%	.095186
Harris County ESD #48	Dual	HCESD48 FD	1%	.089
Harris County ESD #50	Dual	Channelview FD	1%	.05
Harris County ESD #60	Fire	Sheldon VFD	1%	.05
Harris County ESD #75	Dual	Baytown FD	1%	.0875
Harris County ESD #80	Fire	Crosby FD	1%	.04178
Harris-Fort Bend ESD #100	Dual	Community FD	1%	.07951
Waller-Harris ESD #200	Other	Multiple Fire/EMS Agencies		.0995

== Health and animal services ==
Within Harris County, hospital services for the indigent and needy are provided by the Harris Health System (Harris County Hospital District), a separate governmental entity. Harris Health System operates two hospitals: LBJ General Hospital and Ben Taub General Hospital, as well as many clinics and the former Quentin Mease Community Hospital.

Numerous private and public hospitals operate in Harris County, including institutions in Texas Medical Center and throughout the county, for example the Harris County Psychiatric Center.

Harris County Public Health is the countywide public health agency.

Harris County Public Health maintains the county animal shelter in Houston. The following municipalities, all or partly in Harris County, operate their own animal shelters: Houston (which operates the Bureau of Animal Regulation and Control or BARC), Friendswood (shelter in Galveston County), Humble, Katy (shelter in Fort Bend County), League City (shelter in Galveston County), Missouri City (shelter in Fort Bend County), Pasadena, and Pearland (shelter in Brazoria County). Bellaire, Galena Park, and West University Place maintain dog kennels.

== Transportation ==
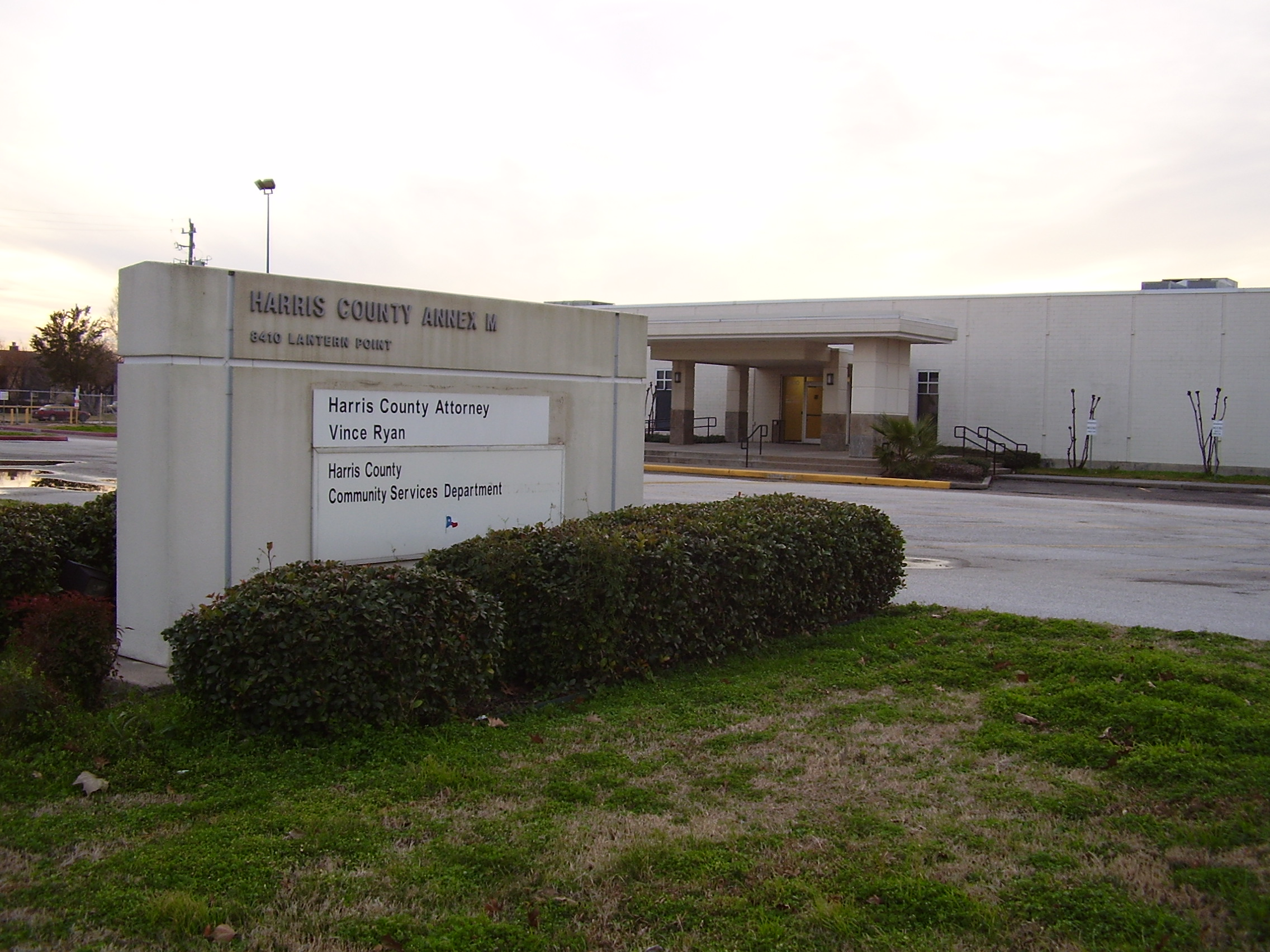
Harris County Annex M has the headquarters of the Harris County Transit agency.

Harris County is a key hub for both traditional and emerging transportation systems, including public transit, highways, and autonomous vehicle technology. With its proximity to major cities and a rapidly expanding infrastructure, the county plays a significant role in shaping the future of transportation in Texas.

=== Public Transportation and Transit Services ===
Harris County is served by multiple transit agencies that aim to make commuting more accessible and sustainable for residents.

- Metropolitan Transit Authority of Harris County, Texas (METRO) provides bus and rail services across the county.
- Harris County Transit offers services to communities outside of METRO’s coverage area, such as Baytown and Channelview, ensuring that more rural parts of the county have access to reliable transportation.

=== Transportation Trends ===
As of recent reports, the average one-way commute for a Harris County resident using an automobile is approximately 25 minutes, while those relying on public transportation face a commute of 44 minutes—a significant disparity that emphasizes the importance of continued investment in mass transit infrastructure. In fact, the county has seen a steady increase in the adoption of autonomous vehicles (AVs), which are expected to play a key role in future transportation patterns, offering safer and more efficient alternatives to traditional methods. As autonomous vehicles become more integrated into the county's transportation network, it will be essential to track safety, traffic, and incident data. A recent study on Texas autonomous vehicle crash analysis (2023-2024) found that Harris County accounts for 28% of all reported AV crashes in Texas, indicating the county’s prominence in AV testing and integration.

=== Major highways ===
- I-10
- I-45
- I-69 / US 59
- I-610
- US 90
  - US 90 Alt.
- US 290 (Northwest Freeway)
- SH 3
- SH 6
- SH 99
- SH 134
- SH 146
- SH 225
- SH 249
- SH 288
- Beltway 8 (Sam Houston Tollway)
- NASA 1
- Loop 494
- Spur 5
- Spur 261
- Spur 330
- Spur 501
- Spur 527
- Spur 548 (unsigned)

=== Mass transit ===
Many areas in Harris County are served by Metropolitan Transit Authority of Harris County, Texas (METRO), a public transportation agency headquartered in Downtown Houston.

Some communities outside of METRO's service area, such as Baytown, Texas, and Channelview, Texas, are served by Harris County Transit.

=== Intercity buses ===
Greyhound Bus Lines operates various stations throughout Harris County.

=== Airports ===
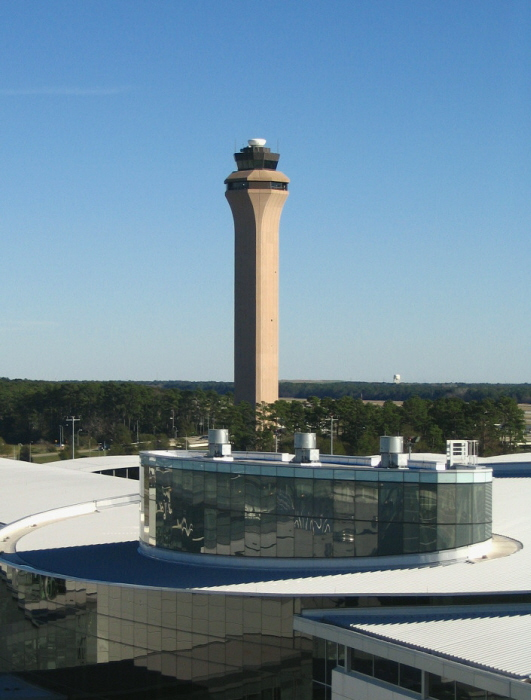
George Bush Intercontinental Airport

Two commercial airports, George Bush Intercontinental Airport and William P. Hobby Airport, are located in Houston and in Harris County. The Houston Airport System defines Harris County as a part of Bush Intercontinental's service region. The city of Houston operates Ellington Field, a general aviation and military airport in Harris County.

General aviation airports for fixed-wing aircraft outside of Houston include:

- Publicly owned
  - La Porte Municipal Airport in La Porte
  - Baytown Airport in unincorporated east Harris County, north of Baytown
- Privately owned, public use
  - West Houston Airport is a general aviation airport located in unincorporated western Harris County, west of the Houston city limits.
  - Dan Jones International Airport in unincorporated northwestern Harris County
  - Weiser Air Park in unincorporated northern Harris County
  - David Wayne Hooks Memorial Airport, a general aviation airport, is located outside of the Tomball city limits in unincorporated northwest Harris County.
  - Sack-O-Grande Acroport (also known as Harbican Airport) is located in western unincorporated Harris County.
- Privately owned, private use
  - Hoffpauir Airport is located in western unincorporated Harris County.

== See also ==
- Braeburn Terrace, Houston
- Greater Houston
- List of museums in the Texas Gulf Coast
- National Register of Historic Places listings in Harris County, Texas
- North Channel Sentinel
- Recorded Texas Historic Landmarks in Harris County
- USNS Harris County (T-LST-822)
