= Braeburn Terrace, Houston =

Braeburn Terrace is a community located in southwestern Harris County, Texas.. A portion of the community is located in Houston, Texas, in the Southwest Management District, and a portion is located in Bellaire, Texas, on the south side of the city. The population of the neighborhood was 1,130 as of the 2010 national census.

== History ==
The community is sometimes also referred to as Holly and/or Avenue B, after the two major streets that run through the neighborhood, Holly Street. The community officially begins at the 4600 block of Holly Street. The streets in Houston are located south of the Meyer Land Shopping Plaza.

== Demographics and racial make-up ==
The demographics of the community are as follows:

- Brae Burn Terrace median household income –
  - $39,740
- Brae Burn Terrace Racial breakdown (from largest to smallest) –
  - 50% Hispanic or Latino
  - 20% Asian or Pacific Islander
  - 20% White or Caucasian
  - 10% Black or African American
  - 0% Native American or American Indian

== Crime ==
Brae Burn Terrace has a higher crime rate than Greater Houston.
