= Traces, Texas =

Unincorporated community in Texas, US

Traces is a subdivision in unincorporated northwestern Harris County, Texas, United States. Mint Homes built houses in Traces.

The 18-house Trace Meadows neighborhood is an affordable housing project created by Housing and Economic Development's Harris County office, and the Great Northwest Community Development Corporation (GNCDC) and Mint Homes. The neighborhood opened in 2004. The houses, with 1,236 to 2,020-square-foot (188 m^{2}) floor plans, ranged in price from $99,000 to $120,000 United States dollars. GNCDC included a $5,000 grant with each three and four bedroom house. Denis Matties, the president of the Traces Homeowners Association, said that the groups involved collaborated with the existing homeowners and agreed to develop the new subdivision in a satisfactory manner.

== History ==
Its 2005 the subdivision had a median price range of $77,000-$124,000 U.S. dollars. The 2005 price per square foot was $70.85 while its 2006 median price per square foot was $69.22.

== Government and infrastructure ==
Klein is within Harris County Precinct 4. As of 2008 Jerry Eversole heads the precinct.

The community is served by the Harris County Sheriff's Office District I Patrol, headquartered from the Cypresswood Substation at 6831 Cypresswood Drive. The area is served by the Northwest Volunteer Fire Department.

== Education ==
Students living in Traces are zoned to the Klein Independent School District. The zoned schools are Klenk Elementary School, Wunderlich Intermediate School, and Klein Forest High School.
