= North Channel Sentinel =

- Type: Weekly
- Format: Broadsheet
- Owner(s): ASP Westward LP
- Publisher: Gordon Gallatin
- Editor: David Taylor
- Founded: 1942
- Ceased publication: August 29, 2010
- Headquarters: 102 South Shaver; Pasadena, Texas 77506; United States
- Circulation: 26,000 weekly
- Price: Free
- Website: http://www.wayback.archive.org/*/http://northchannelsentinel.com/

The North Channel Sentinel was a weekly community newspaper serving the Channelview, Galena Park, Jacinto City, North Shore, and Sheldon communities in east and northeast Harris County. It was owned by ASP Westward LP, The Sentinel started as a family-owned newspaper and was once owned by media mogul Rupert Murdoch.
