= Willowbrook Mall (Houston) =

Shopping mall in Texas, U.S.

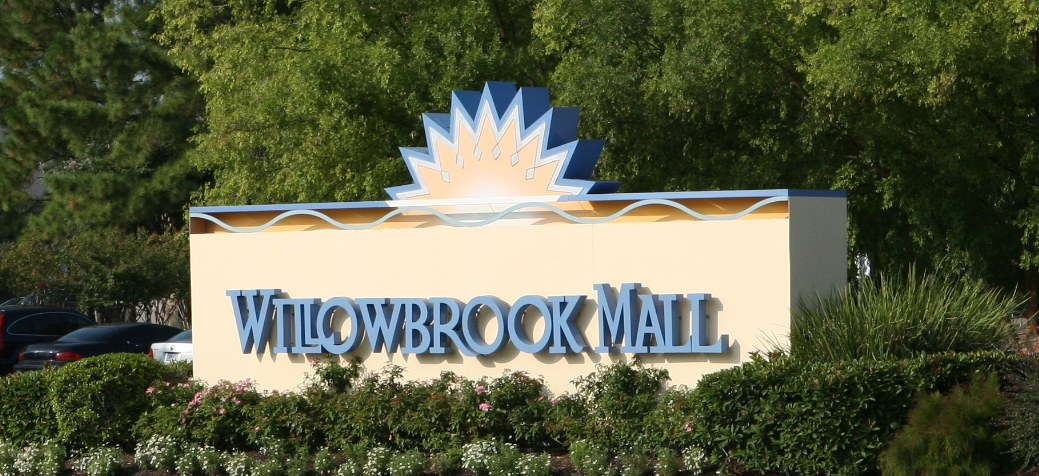
- Entrance sign to Willowbrook Mall, 2012
- Location: Willowbrook, Houston, Texas, United States
- Coordinates: 29.959°N 95.539°W
- Address: 2000 Willowbrook Mall
- Opened: 1981; 45 years ago
- Developer: Homart Development Company
- Manager: GGP
- Owner: GGP
- Architect: Architectonics, Inc.
- Num. of stores: 140
- Floor area: 1,510,000 sq ft (140,000 m^{2})
- Floors: 1 (2 in Dick's Sporting Goods, JCPenney, Macy's, and Round1; 3 in Dillard's)
- Parking: 8,900
- Public transit: METRO Routes 44 & 86
- Website: shopwillowbrookmall.com

Willowbrook Mall is an enclosed regional mall in Willowbrook, Houston, Texas at the intersection of Texas State Highway 249 and Farm to Market Road 1960.

== History ==
Ground for Willowbrook was broken in 1979. The mall was developed by Homart Development Company, a unit of Sears. Architectonics, Inc. of Chicago was the architect. It opened in 1981, a time of high growth for the area, with anchors Foley's, Montgomery Ward, and Sears. Joske's opened a store in 1983, along with Macy's in 1984, and JCPenney added a store in 1992, bringing the total number of anchor stores to 6.

The mall was sold to a group of investors in 1990. The mall underwent extensive remodeling in 1992.

Joske's was bought by Dillard's in 1987. After opening a larger location in 1997 that was originally occupied by Macy's, Dillard's planned to operate its original Joske's location featuring a men's department and housewares and stock the usual merchandise in the space formerly occupied by Macy's. However, Dillard's abandoned plans to operate 2 stores at the mall in 1998 and sold the original Joske's store to Lord & Taylor, which opened a 122,212-square-foot (11,353.9 m^{2}) store later the same year. As part of May Department Stores' reconfiguration of Lord & Taylor, the store was closed in January 2004, and the location eventually became Nordstrom Rack in 2014.

In 2000, the mall was the 3rd largest Houston-area retail development based on net rentable area.

Montgomery Ward closed its store in March 2001 after the company went out of business. The store was taken over by Foley's in 2003. In 2006, the two Foley's stores became Macy's.

In 2001, the mall was acquired by General Growth Properties from a pension fund managed by Lend Lease Real Estate Investments Inc. At that time the mall was "one of the most successful retail shopping malls in Houston, consistently ranking near the Houston Galleria, Memorial City Mall and Baybrook Mall as one of the area's top-grossing malls per square foot, producing sales of about $430 per square foot". Dillard's completed a renovation of its store the same year, expanding it by 50%.

In April 2015, Lush opened a store in the mall.

In October 2016, the mall added Dick's Sporting Goods.

On February 6, 2020, it was announced that Sears would be closing as part of a plan to close 31 stores nationwide. The store closed in April 2020. The former Sears was redeveloped into a Round1 Entertainment Center arcade which opened on December 20, 2025.

In 2025, Primark, an Irish fashion retailer, announced that it would be opening a store in the remainder of the former Sears building next to Round1. Construction on the new Primark store started in 2025. Work was projected to be completed and the store open in summer 2026. Primark opened on July 16, 2026.
