= Harris County Psychiatric Center =

Coordinates: 29°42′44″N 95°22′28″W

The University of Texas Harris County Psychiatric Center

Geography
- Location: Houston, Texas, United States

Organization
- Care system: Public
- Type: Specialist
- Affiliated university: University of Texas Health Science Center at Houston

Services
- Speciality: Psychiatric

History
- Founded: 1981

Links
- Website: hcpc.uth.tmc.edu
- Lists: Hospitals in Texas

The University of Texas Harris County Psychiatric Center (aka the UTHCPC, Harris County Psychiatric Center or HCPC) is a psychiatric hospital in Harris County, Texas,
