= Cybersoft =

American school software company

Cybersoft Technologies, Inc.
- Company type: Private
- Industry: IT services
- Founded: 1998; 28 years ago
- Headquarters: Houston, Texas
- Key people: Charlie Yalamanchili (Founder)
- Products: Software
- Services: Software Products
- Website: Official Website

Cybersoft Technologies, Inc. is a software company that makes software for School Nutrition or Food Service departments in K-12 school districts in the United States. The company has its headquarters along Cypress Creek Parkway in Harris County, Houston, Texas.

The company's customers include West Virginia Department of Education, Houston Independent School District, Buffalo Public Schools, Oklahoma City Public Schools and Fortune 1000 corporations.

== History ==
Cybersoft was founded by Charlie Yalamanchili, an entrepreneur who also founded CNC Investments, a commercial real estate investment company that was launched in 1982.

Cybersoft invented a system, PrimeroEdge, formerly Primero Food Service Solutions, that serves as a pre-paid school cafeteria meal system, so children in cafeterias do not have to have cash on their person as they pay for their meals.
