= Guy R. Rankin =

Guy R. Rankin, IV is the former chief executive officer (CEO) of the Harris County Housing Authority in Houston, Texas.

He is the CEO and President of International Housing Solutions.
