= Harris County Transit =

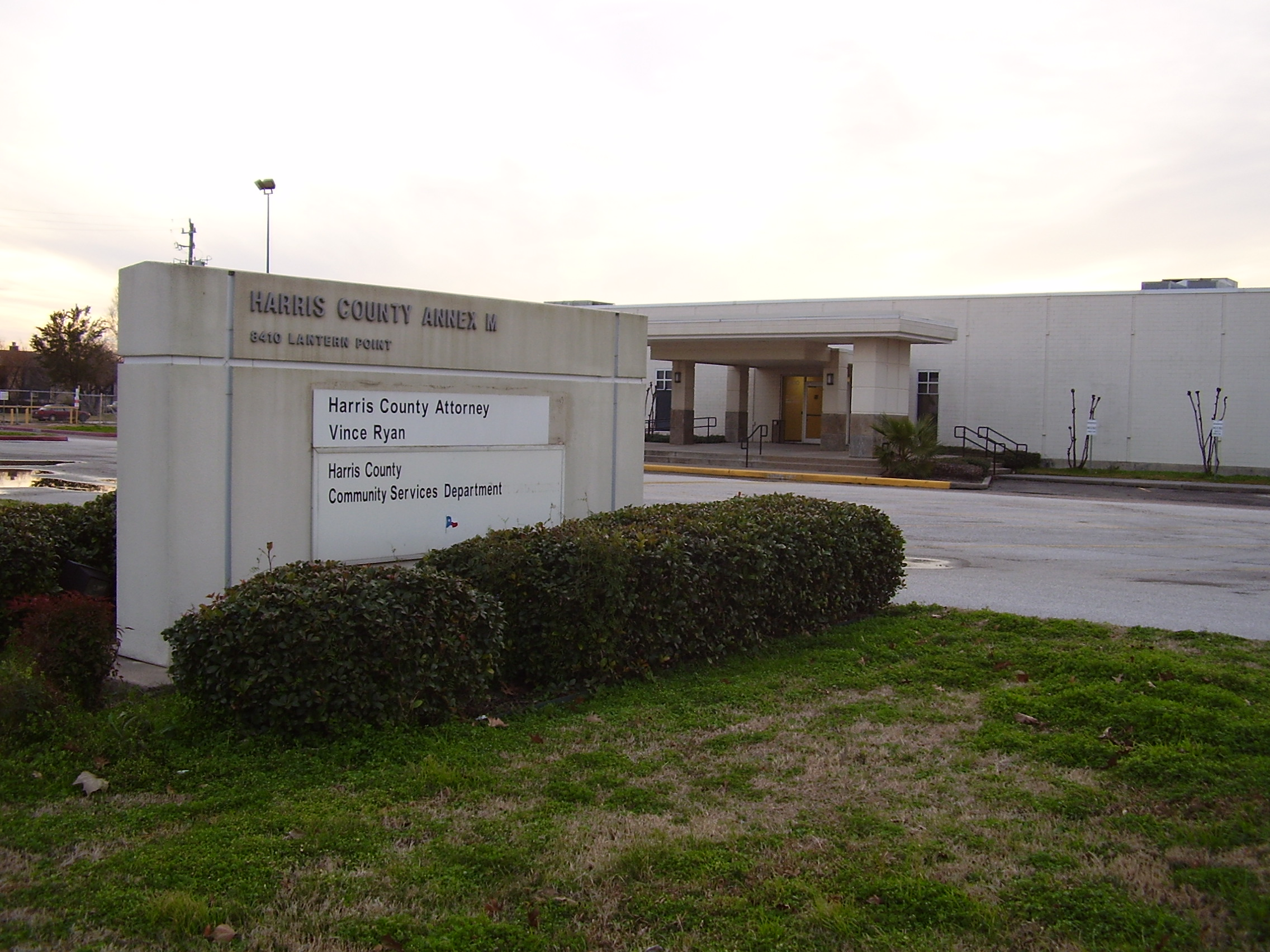
Harris County Annex M has the headquarters of the agency

The Harris County Transit Services Division is a transportation agency that serves areas of Harris County, Texas that do not have service from Metropolitan Transit Authority of Harris County, Texas (METRO). The agency, a division of the Harris County Community Services Department, has its headquarters in Harris County Annex M in Houston.

The agency serves the cities of Baytown and La Porte, as well as the unincorporated area of Crosby. It formerly served the cities of Pasadena, Seabrook, Shoreacres (now a part of La Porte), and South Houston. In addition the agency served Highlands, another unincorporated area, as well as the portion of Clear Lake City in Houston.
