= Harris County Public Health =

Harris County Public Health (HCPH) is a department of the government of Harris County, Texas.

The agency's headquarters are in the Sheila Jackson Lee Building in Downtown Houston.

It was formerly known as Harris County Public Health & Environmental Services (HCPHES).

== History ==
Barbie Robinson was the director until her 2024 termination. She had plans to file a lawsuit against the county government. Kim Ogg, the county district attorney, had filed criminal charges against Robinson, but these charges were dismissed, and the county commissioners voted to cover Robinson's legal fees.

After Robinson's termination, Leah Barton became the interim director of the department. She was officially named the director in 2025.

== Divisions ==
=== Harris County Pets ===
Harris County Pets (animal shelter)

Harris County Pets, formerly known as Harris County Rabies/Animal Control, is the county-run animal shelter and animal control service. Its facility is in northern Houston. It is an open-intake shelter that covers unincorporated Harris County.

The current county animal shelter facility, the 50,000-square-foot (4,600 m^{2}) Harris County Pets Resource Center, began operations in 2020. It can hold 525 animals, twice the number of animals as the previous facility. It was financed by a 2015-passed bond worth $24,000,000.

In 2019 the live release rate, meaning the rate that dogs and cats left the shelter alive, was 95.7. This means it would be considered a "no kill shelter". In 2024 the shelter had a goal of a 95% release rate.

Previously the agency had a 30-day hold stay for animals before the animal would be scheduled for euthanasia. In 2024 the agency reduced this to 15 days.

== See also ==
- Harris Health - The hospital district of Harris County, Texas
