= Champion Forest, Texas =

Subdivision near Houston, Texas

Coordinates: 30.002°N 95.544°W

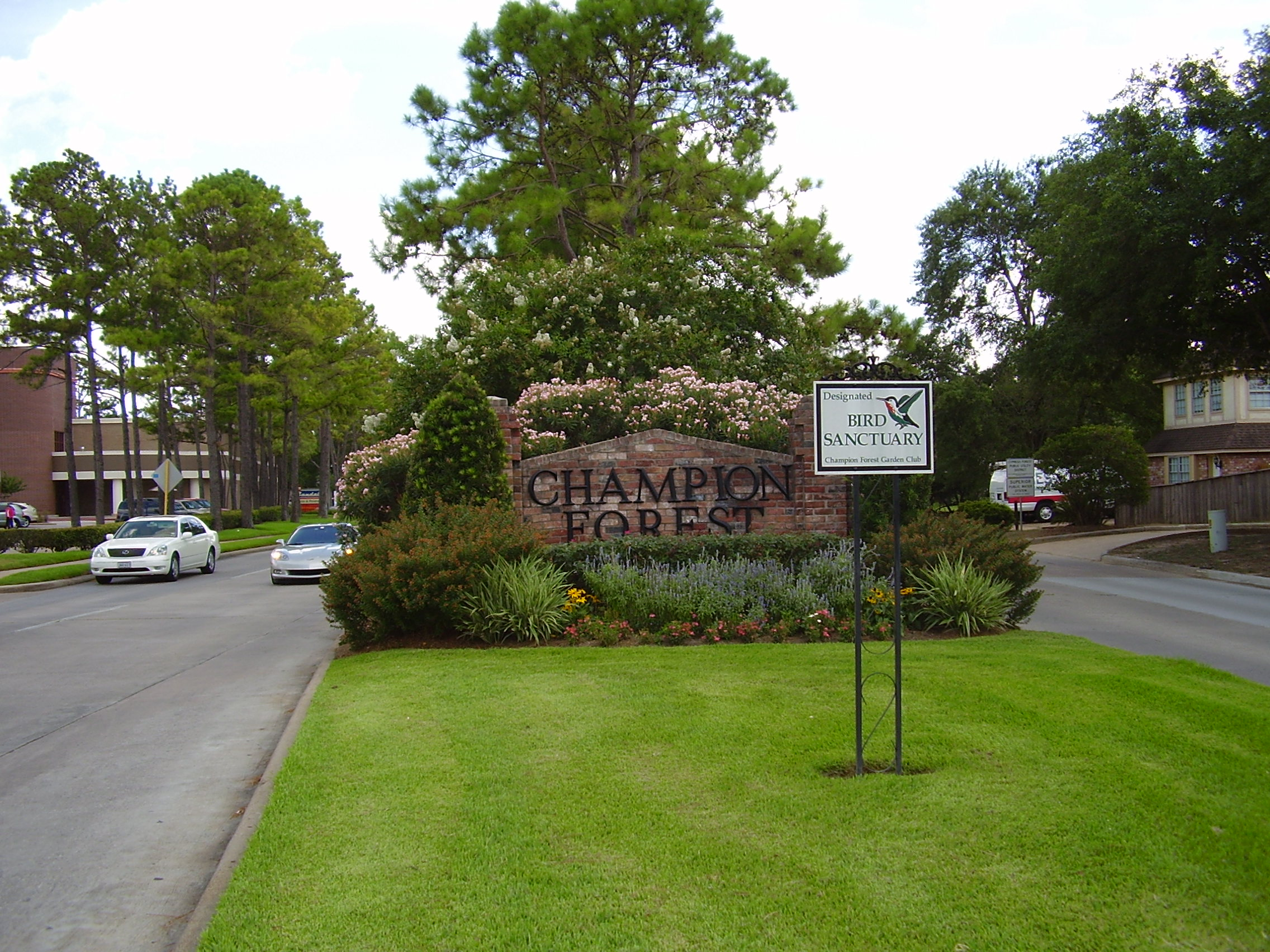
Champion Forest

Champion Forest is a neighborhood in unincorporated northwestern Harris County, Texas, United States, in Greater Houston.

It is located near Farm to Market Road 1960 and Texas State Highway 249 next to Willowbrook. Bill Murphy of the Houston Chronicle described the neighborhood as "affluent". Since 1980, the neighborhood has been designated as a bird sanctuary.

In 2006, Champion Forest opposed the Raveneaux Country Club's plan to build as many as five hundred townhouses and condominiums on its property and then maintain the rest of its property as a golf course. Robert Eckels, the county judge of Harris County who lived near Champion Forest, opposed the plan. Eckels asked the Harris County right-of-way division to see how much it would cost for the county to force 288 acres (1.17 km^{2}) from the country club as eminent domain so the acres could become parkland.

== Education ==
Students living in Champions are zoned to the Klein Independent School District. The zoned schools are Brill Elementary School, Kleb Intermediate School and Klein High School.
