= Joe Kegans State Jail =

Prison in Houston, Texas

Coordinates: 29.7639°N 95.3546°W

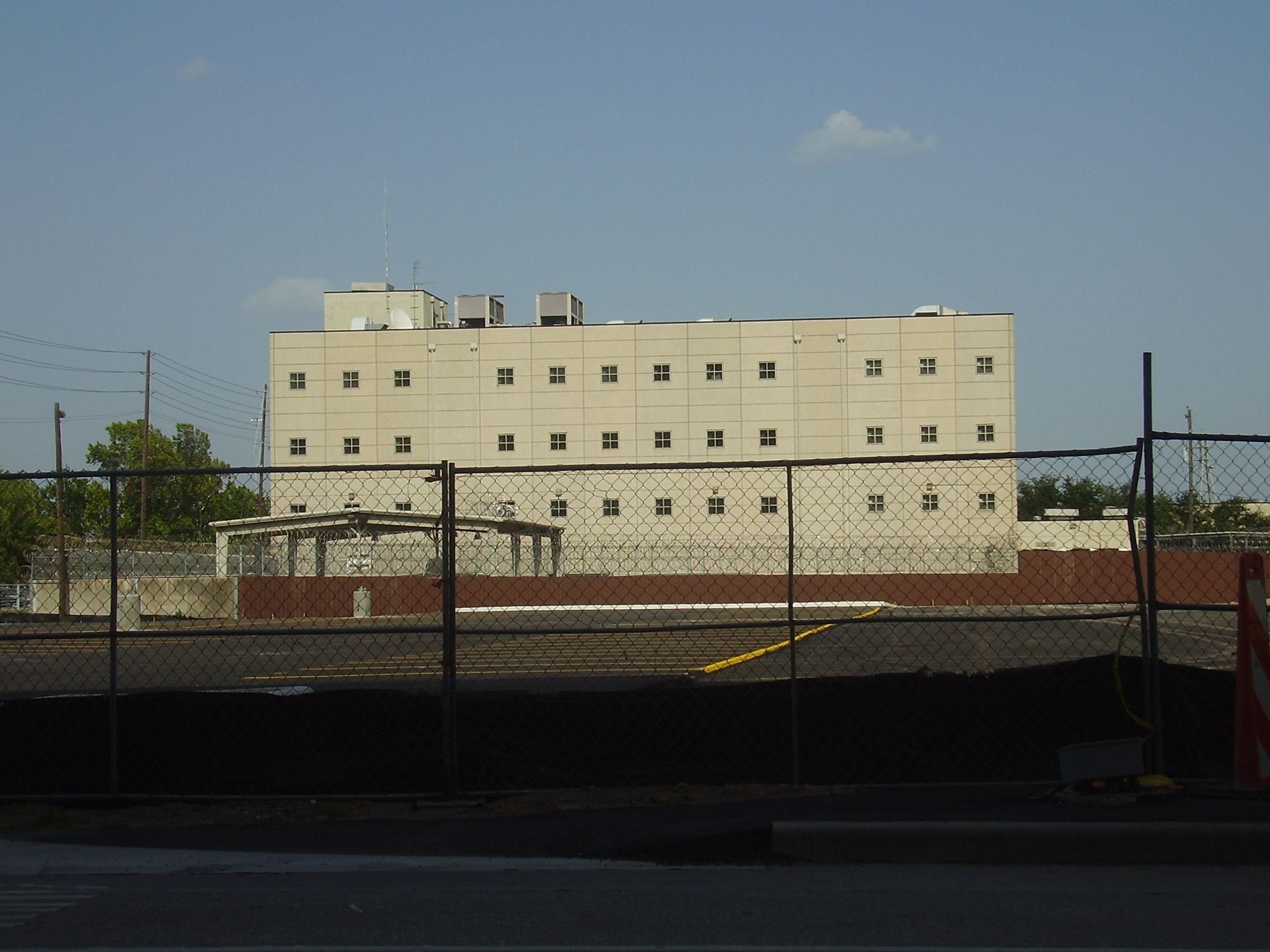
Joe Kegans Intermediate Sanctions Facility

Joe Kegans Intermediate Sanctions Facility is an Intermediate Sanctions facility of the Texas Department of Criminal Justice located along the northeast edge of Downtown Houston, Texas. The approximately 1 acre (0.40 ha) facility for men is located .5 miles (0.80 km) south of Interstate 10.

The detention facility building that Kegans uses first opened in February 1995 as a place to house nonviolent offenders in order to relieve prison overcrowding. The unit closed after four months of use because not enough inmates had been put there to justify the additional expenses. The building had been unoccupied for two years before it re-opened in 1997. The building was formally dedicated at 10 A.M. on Wednesday October 15, 1997. As of 1997 all prisoners at the unit are convicted of parole violations such as non-violent property crimes. The unit was named after Joe Kegans, a state district judge who died in 1997 at 69 years of age.

The Kegans Jail serves state jail offenders from Harris County. As of 2001 Kegans serves lower risk offenders.
