= Willowbrook, Houston =

Area in northwest Houston, Texas

Coordinates: 29.9547°N 95.5513°W

Willowbrook is an area in northwest Houston, Texas, United States, bordered by the Cutten Road to the east, Grant to the north, Rockland to the west, and Beltway 8 to the south. Sam Houston Race Park is one mile away.

== Government and infrastructure ==
The Houston Police Department (HPD) serves Willowbrook from the North Belt Police Station. The station opened in January 2018. HPD previously served it as part of the Northwest Patrol Division. The department previously operated the Willowbrook Storefront.

Houston Fire Department (HFD) built a temporary Station #96 at West Greens Road and Mills in 1995. In 1999 a new Station #96 was built at Willow Chase and Breton Ridge to service the Willowbrook Mall area and opened in 2000.

Houston City Council District A covers Willowbrook. As of 2008 Toni Lawrence represents the district.

Unincorporated areas around Willowbrook are within Harris County Sheriff's Office North Patrol Division.

== Neighborhoods ==
Neighborhoods located in Willowbrook:

- Willowbrook
- Willow Chase Park
- Centerfield

Communities Surrounding Willowbrook:

- Champion Forest
- Greenwood Forest
- Cypress
- Northwest Park

== Demographics ==
According to the 2000 census, the current population of Willowbrook Super Neighborhood #1 is 2,741.

Race and Hispanic origin	Willowbrook Data	% of Area Pop.	Houston City Data
American Indian (non-Hispanic)	6	-%	3,234
Asian (non-Hispanic)	196	-%	102,706
Black (non-Hispanic)	512	-%	487,851
Hispanic (of any race)	419	-%	730,865
Native Hawaiian (non-Hispanic)	5	-%	680
White (non-Hispanic)	1,541	-%	601,851
Two or More (non-Hispanic)	59	-%	23,830
Other (non-Hispanic)	3	-%	2,614

Age Group	Willowbrook Data	% of Area Pop.	Houston City Data
Under 5 Years	219	-%	160,797
5 - 17 Years	349	-%	375,861
18 - 65 Years	1,639	-%	1,252,908
65 and Over	534	-%	164,065

== Education ==
Students living in the district are zoned to the Cypress-Fairbanks Independent School District.

- Francone and Hancock Elementary Schools (separate sections)
- Bleyl and Campbell Middle Schools (separate sections)
- Cypress Creek High School

== See also ==
- Willowbrook Mall
