= Northcliffe Manor, Texas =

Neighborhood in Texas, US

Coordinates: 29°57′56″N 95°29′00″W

Northcliffe Manor

Northcliffe Manor is a neighborhood in Harris County, Texas, United States.

== Education ==
Students living in Northcliffe Manor are zoned to the Klein Independent School District. Residents are zoned to Kaiser Elementary School, Wunderlich Intermediate School, and Klein Forest High School.
