= George Washington Carver High School (Baytown, Texas) =

Location
- 800 Carver Street; Baytown, Texas; U.S.
- Coordinates: 29.7273°N 94.9793°W

Information
- Other name: Goose Creek School for Coloreds (1921-1946); George Washington Carver High School (1947 - 1967); G.W. Carver Elementary School (1967 - 1968); Carver-Jones Elementary School (1968 - 1987); G.W. Carver Elementary School (1988 - 1995)
- Type: Public
- Founded: 1921
- Closed: 1995
- School district: Goose Creek Consolidated Independent School District
- Mascot: Panthers (1947 - 1957); Buccaneers (1957 - 1991); Stars (1991 - 1995)
- Nickname: Pirates
- Website: https://schools.gccisd.net/page/gwce.home

George Washington Carver High School was a public secondary school in Baytown, Texas. It served as the high school for Black students until the public schools in the area were desegregated.

== History ==
In 1921, Goose Creek School for Coloreds opened as a grade school and classes were held at Mt. Rose Baptist Church. It was the first public school in the area that allowed Black American children to attend; students came from Baytown, La Porte, Cedar Bayou, and McNair.

In 1924, the school was moved to a new building at the northwest corner of Carver Street and Oak Street. In 1927, an addition was made to the building and the curriculum was expanded to include the 9th grade.

In 1941, it became a fully accredited high school and was renamed in honor of George Washington Carver, a Black American scientist and inventor.

In 1948, the school was moved to a larger building at the corner of Carver Street and Lee Drive, and the old building became an elementary school.

George Washington Carver High School closed after the 1967 school year and Black students were transferred to Robert E. Lee High School and Ross Sterling High School.

The building continued to be used to house Carver Elementary until 1995, when an abandoned oil pit was discovered on the property. The building was demolished in 2002 due to safety concerns.

The athletic teams, known as the panthers, won 8 state sports championships. The band won nine state championships.

In 2011, an historical marker was installed at the former site of George Washington Carver High School. The historical marker unveiling and dedication ceremony was held at the nearby Robert E. Lee High School Auditorium.

== Notable people ==
- Tony Russell "Charles" Brown, blues singer and pianist
- Joe Tex, Rhythm and blues singer
- Gene Washington, football player

== See also ==
- School segregation in the United States
- Colored
