= 2013 New York Yankees season =

Season for the Major League Baseball team the New York Yankees

2013 New York Yankees
- League: American League
- Division: East
- Ballpark: Yankee Stadium
- City: New York, New York
- Record: 85–77 (.525)
- Divisional place: 3rd
- Owners: Yankee Global Enterprises
- General managers: Brian Cashman
- Managers: Joe Girardi
- Television: YES Network; WWOR-TV (Michael Kay, Ken Singleton, Meredith Marakovits, Jack Curry, David Cone, John Flaherty, Al Leiter, Paul O'Neill, Lou Pinella, Bob Lorenz)
- Radio: New York Yankees Radio Network (John Sterling, Suzyn Waldman, Beto Villa, Francisco Rivera)

The 2013 New York Yankees season was the 111th season for the New York Yankees franchise. The Yankees began their season at home with an 8–2 loss against the Boston Red Sox on April 1. They finished tied for third place in the American League East with an 85–77 record, which was their worst since 1992. The Yankees failed to reach the playoffs for the first time since 2008 and only the second time in nineteen years.

Longtime Yankees closer Mariano Rivera and longtime starting pitcher Andy Pettitte each retired following the 2013 season.

== Pre-season acquisitions ==
- On November 20, the Yankees re-signed Hiroki Kuroda to a one-year contract worth $15 million.
- On November 28, the Yankees re-signed Andy Pettitte to a one-year contract worth $12 million.
- On November 30, the Yankees re-signed Mariano Rivera to a one-year contract worth $10 million.
- On December 14, the Yankees signed Kevin Youkilis to a one-year contract worth $12 million.
- On December 19, the Yankees re-signed Ichiro Suzuki to a two-year contract worth $13 million.
- On February 1, the Yankees signed Travis Hafner to a one-year contract worth $2 million.
- On March 15, the Yankees signed Brennan Boesch to a one-year contract worth $1.5 million.
- On March 26, the Yankees acquired Vernon Wells in a trade for two minor league players.

== Regular season ==
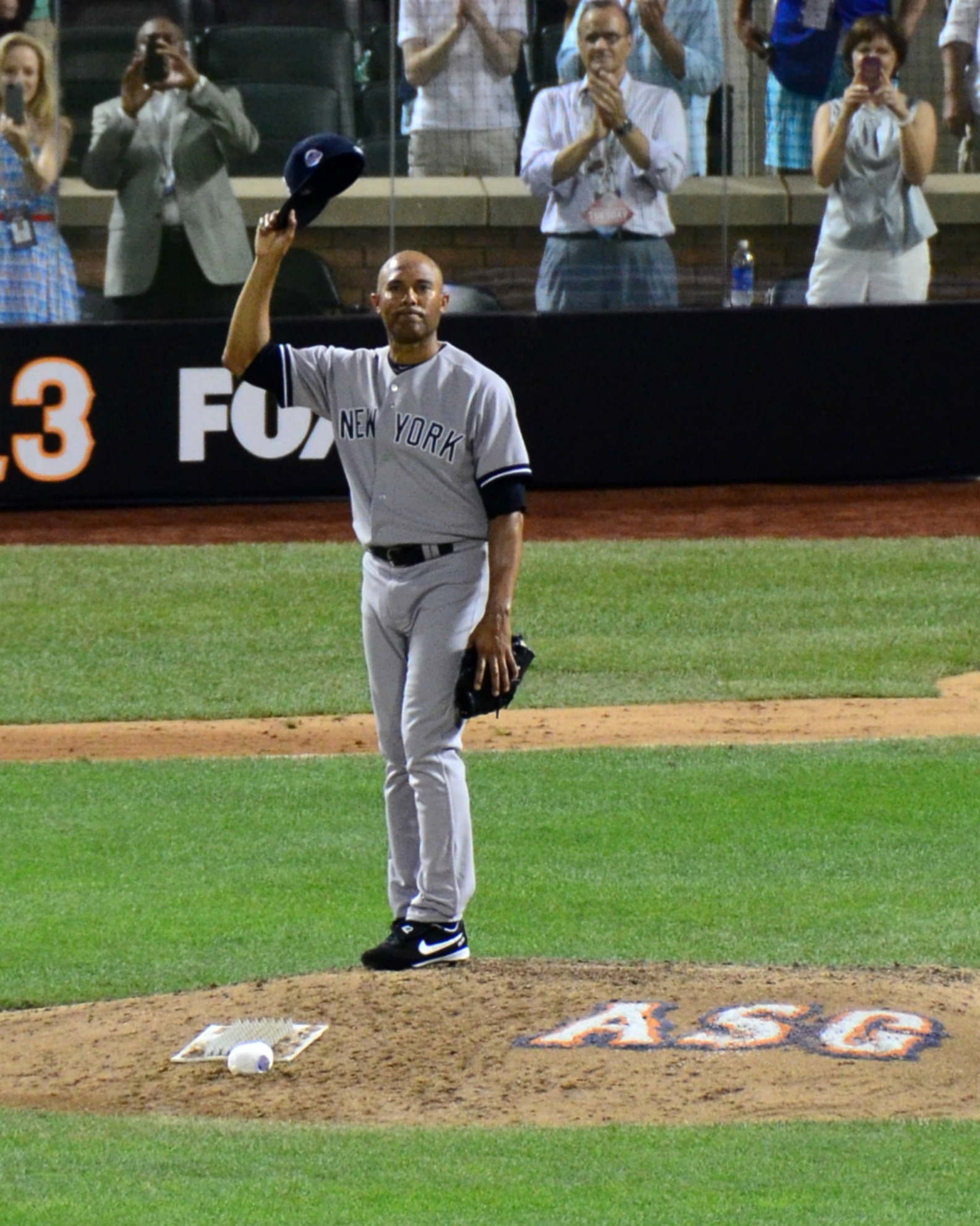
Mariano Rivera received a standing ovation during the Major League Baseball All-Star Game at Citi Field during his retirement tour in his final Major League Baseball season. Rivera also received gifts from each team as he made his final appearance at each ballpark during the season.

=== April ===
Following a sour four-game sweep in the 2012 American League Championship Series and the loss of Derek Jeter to a broken ankle, expectations entering the Yankees' 113th season were uncharacteristically low. With the Blue Jays and Red Sox each making key acquisitions in the offseason as Yankee GM Brian Cashman's adjusted his strategy toward salary reduction, the American League East Division's reputation as a perennial powerhouse had shifted sharply against the Yankees. On Opening Day, the Bombers hosted their long–time rivals, the Boston Red Sox, but lost 8–2. Their next game was also a defeat, but veteran pitcher Andy Pettitte was able to prevent an early sweep by pitching to a 4–2 victory. Mariano Rivera would also earn his first save in what would be a farewell tour of sorts for the future Hall of Fame closer.

Much to the surprise of fans and pundits alike, the injury-plagued Yankees held a first place lead in the division at the end of April with a record of 16–10. On April 12, they turned a 4–6–5–6–5–3–4 triple play in the 8th inning of a 5–2 win against the Baltimore Orioles.

=== May ===
On May 9, Yankees second baseman Robinson Canó recorded his 1500th career hit with a single to center field at Coors Field in a 3–1 win against the Colorado Rockies. Without the help of core players Derek Jeter, Alex Rodriguez, Curtis Granderson, and Mark Teixeira, all of whom had been assigned to extended DL stints, the Yankees remained competitive through shrewd acquisitions of journeyman and platoon roleplayers such as Travis Hafner, Brennan Boesch, Lyle Overbay, and former Boston Red Sox first-baseman Kevin Youkilis. Though Granderson and Teixeira would return to the Yankee lineup by early summer, both would return to the DL after each suffered further injury. On May 30, the Yankees were swept by their crosstown rival New York Mets for the first time in the season series between the teams after a 3–1 loss at home. The Mets' sweep come a full decade after the 2003 Yankees won all six games from the Mets. In the second game, Mariano Rivera suffered his first blown save of the season and the first in his career where he failed to get an out by allowing two runs in the ninth in a 2–1 loss.

=== June ===
Despite entering the month of June with winning records for both April and May, the Yankees would finish the month with unimpressive offensive productivity and, due in large part to continued injury, a frustratingly inconsistent lineup. Following a sweep of the Cleveland Indians, the Yankees took three out of four games in Seattle and seemed capable of maintaining competitiveness until some of their core players returned. On June 8, Andy Pettitte won his 250th career win and Mariano Rivera continued his age-defying season by earning his 22nd save. But by the end of an extended west coast trip, Kevin Youkilis and Mark Teixeira's injuries were aggravated and both were lost for the remainder of the season. The Yankees lost three games against the Oakland Athletics, including the 18-inning finale to complete the sweep. The end of June looked bleak for the Yankees, winning only one of three games against the Texas Rangers and getting swept by the Baltimore Orioles for the first time since 2005. The Yankees finished June with a record of 11 wins and 16 losses, the first time they finished a month with a losing record since September 2010, where they went 12–15.

=== July ===
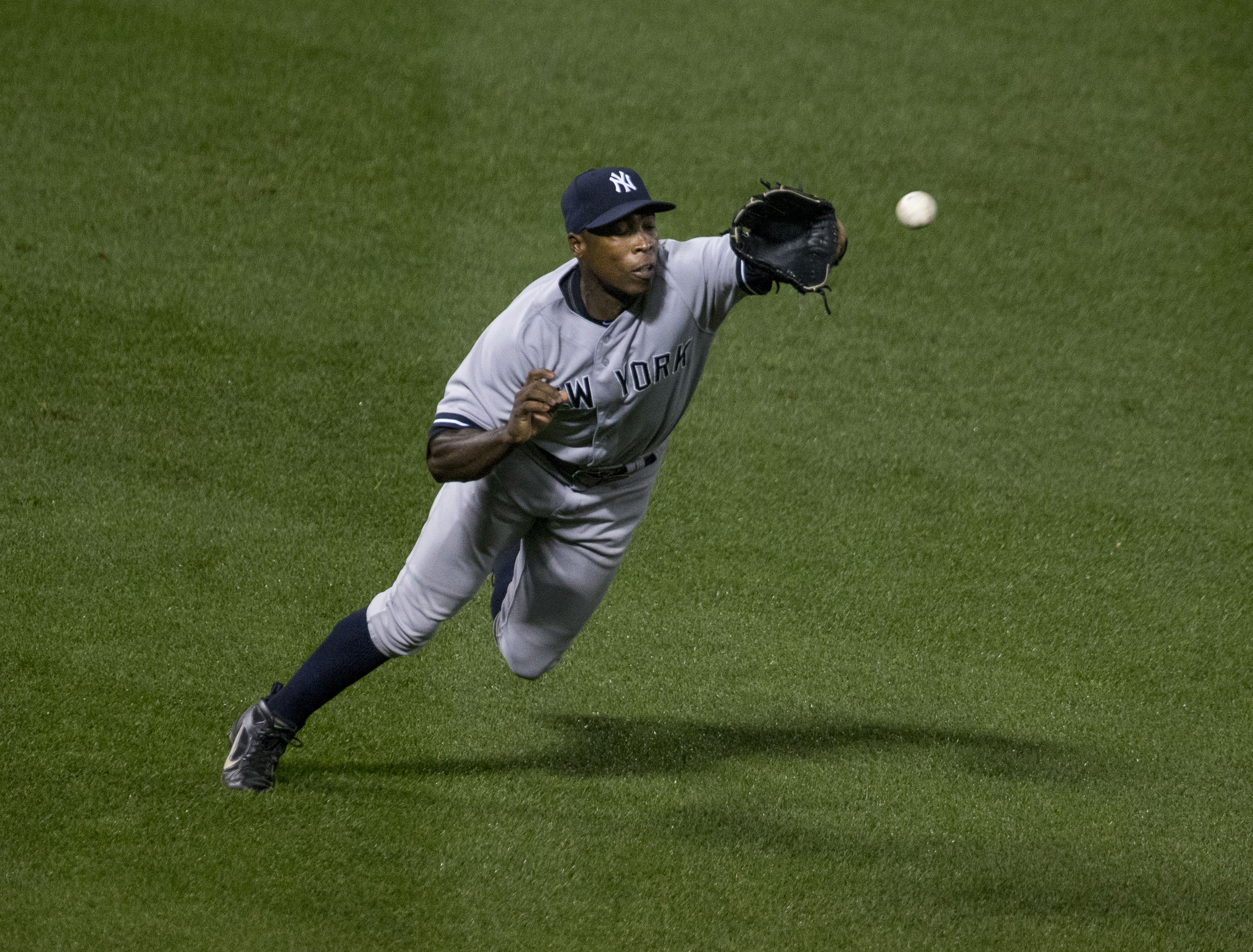
Alfonso Soriano returned to the Yankees in July as a result of a trade with the Chicago Cubs.

July showed some improvement after winning six straight games, their longest winning streak of the year. On July 1, pitcher Andy Pettitte recorded his 1,958th strikeout as a Yankee, becoming the franchise's all-time strikeout leader with a strikeout of the Minnesota Twins' Justin Morneau, surpassing Whitey Ford. They swept a four-game set against the Twins in Minnesota and won the first two of three at home versus the Orioles, but Rivera's second blown save of the season, similar to the first (allowing two runs in the ninth in a 2–1 loss) snapped the streak. The Yankees finished the first half by losing two of three to the Twins at home for the first time since 2001.

As was originally hoped at the beginning of the year, the return of much-needed reinforcements had started to look promising. Derek Jeter came back to the lineup for the first time since breaking his ankle in the 2012 ALCS, picking up a hit in his first at bat. Long-injured starting pitcher Michael Pineda also began playing in game situations in the minors, and third-baseman Alex Rodriguez had started at 20-game rehab assignment in Scranton. But Jeter's return was quickly marred by a quadriceps strain that would sideline the captain for several weeks after only one game.

With the summer trade deadline quickly approaching, the lack of right handed power, and the return dates of Rodriguez, Jeter, and Granderson still uncertain, the Yankees acquired outfielder Alfonso Soriano from the Chicago Cubs in the hopes of increasing the team's dismal power numbers (Soriano had hit 8 home runs the month prior to moving to New York, which is one more home run than the entire Yankee team had hit during that span). Soriano, who started his career with the Yankees, received a warm ovation from the Yankee fans upon his return on July 26. The New York Post reported soon after that Brian Cashman had reservations about acquiring Soriano, but was overruled by Yankee management.

Derek Jeter returned to the Yankee lineup for the second time on July 28 and hit a solo home run on the first pitch of his first at bat. Alfonso Soriano would hit a walk-off single to give the Yankees a 6–5 victory.

=== August ===
On August 5, Alex Rodriguez was suspended for 211 games (until the end of the 2014 MLB season) for his involvement with the South Florida anti-aging clinic Biogenesis. He promptly appealed this suspension and was allowed to resume play for the rest of the season, but the suspension was upheld for the entire 2014 MLB regular season and postseason.

On August 22, the Yankees swept a four-game set versus the Toronto Blue Jays at home for a perfect 10–0 home record versus them.

=== September ===
After sweeping a three-game set at home versus the Chicago White Sox to start the month after being swept by them in Chicago on August 5–7 for the second straight year, the Yankees lost the first three of four at home to the Red Sox with Rivera blowing two saves, but won the last on a ninth inning wild pitch. They took three of four from the Orioles in Camden Yards before being swept by the Red Sox at Fenway Park.

The Yankees closed interleague play with three games at home versus the San Francisco Giants. On September 20, Alex Rodriguez hit his 24th career grand slam to surpass Lou Gehrig as the all-time grand slam leader in a 5–1 win. Iván Nova pitched a complete shutout in the Yankees 6–0 win. In the series finale, Pettitte made his final home start in a 2–1 loss.

On September 25, 2013, the Yankees lost to the Tampa Bay Rays, which for the second time in the wild card era, eliminated them from making the playoffs for the first time since 2008. The Rays swept the three-game set in the Bronx for the first time ever and Rivera made his final appearance in the 8th inning of the series finale, retiring all four batters he faced.

The Yankees finished the season by sweeping the Houston Astros at Minute Maid Park with Pettitte earning his final victory in the second game.

=== Roster ===
2013 New York Yankees
Roster
Pitchers: 61 Dellin Betances; 34 Chris Bootcheck; 64 César Cabral; 62 Joba Chamberlain; 38 Preston Claiborne; 40 Matt Daley; 38 Cody Eppley; 60,61 David Huff; 65 Phil Hughes; 27 Shawn Kelley; 18 Hiroki Kuroda; 48 Boone Logan; 70 Brett Marshall; 34 Jim Miller; 47 Iván Nova; 34 Vidal Nuño; 46 Andy Pettitte; 41 David Phelps; 42 Mariano Rivera; 30 David Robertson; 52 CC Sabathia; 43 Adam Warren; 67 Mike Zagurski	Catchers: 29 Francisco Cervelli; 66 J. R. Murphy; 53 Austin Romine; 19 Chris Stewart; Infielders: 39,45 David Adams; 40 Reid Brignac; 24 Robinson Canó; 61 Luis Cruz; 40 Alberto González; 22 Travis Ishikawa; 2 Derek Jeter; 61 Corban Joseph; 39 Brent Lillibridge; 39 Chris Nelson; 17 Jayson Nix; 26 Eduardo Núñez; 55 Lyle Overbay; 39 Mark Reynolds; 13 Alex Rodriguez; 17 Brendan Ryan; 25 Mark Teixeira; 36 Kevin Youkilis	Outfielders: 63,45 Zoilo Almonte; 22 Brennan Boesch; 45 Ben Francisco; 11 Brett Gardner; 14 Curtis Granderson; 60 Melky Mesa; 22,40 Thomas Neal; 12 Alfonso Soriano; 31 Ichiro Suzuki; 12,22 Vernon Wells; Other batters: 33 Travis Hafner	Manager: 28 Joe Girardi; Coaches: 57 Mike Harkey (bullpen); 50 Mick Kelleher (1st base); 54 Kevin Long (hitting); 56 Tony Peña (bench); 88 Román Rodríguez (bullpen catcher); 58 Larry Rothschild (pitching); 59 Rob Thomson (3rd base)

== Player stats ==
=== Batting ===
Note: POS = Position; G = Games played; AB = At bats; R = Runs; H = Hits; 2B = Doubles; 3B = Triples; HR = Home runs; RBI = Runs batted in; SB = Stolen bases; BB = Walks; AVG = Batting average

Player	POS	G	AB	R	H	2B	3B	HR	RBI	SB	BB	AVG
Chris Stewart	C	109	294	28	62	6	0	4	25	4	30	.211
Lyle Overbay	1B	142	445	43	107	24	1	14	59	2	36	.240
Robinson Canó	2B	160	605	81	190	41	0	27	107	7	65	.314
Eduardo Núñez	SS	90	304	38	79	17	4	3	28	10	20	.260
Jayson Nix	3B	87	267	32	63	9	1	3	24	13	24	.236
Vernon Wells	LF	130	424	45	99	16	0	11	50	7	30	.233
Brett Gardner	CF	145	539	81	147	33	10	8	52	24	52	.273
Ichiro Suzuki	RF	150	520	57	136	15	3	7	35	20	26	.262
Travis Hafner	DH	82	262	31	53	8	1	12	37	2	32	.202
Curtis Granderson	CF	61	214	31	49	13	2	7	15	8	27	.229
Alfonso Soriano	LF	58	219	37	56	8	0	17	50	8	21	.256
Alex Rodriguez	3B	44	156	21	38	7	0	7	19	4	23	.244
David Adams	3B	43	140	10	27	5	1	2	13	0	9	.193
Austin Romine	C	60	135	15	28	9	0	1	10	1	8	.207
Mark Reynolds	1B	36	110	15	26	6	0	6	19	0	8	.236
Kevin Youkilis	3B	28	105	12	23	7	0	2	8	0	8	.219
Zoilo Almonte	LF	34	106	9	25	4	0	1	9	3	6	.236
Derek Jeter	SS	17	63	8	12	1	0	1	7	0	8	.190
Mark Teixeira	1B	15	53	5	8	1	0	3	12	0	8	.151
Brendan Ryan	SS	17	59	7	13	2	0	1	1	0	2	.220
Francisco Cervelli	C	17	52	12	14	3	0	3	8	0	8	.269
Luis Cruz	IF	16	55	6	10	1	0	0	5	1	1	.182
Brennan Boesch	RF	23	51	6	14	2	1	3	8	0	2	.275
Ben Francisco	DH	21	44	4	5	1	0	1	1	0	5	.114
Reid Brignac	SS	17	44	1	5	1	0	0	0	0	1	.114
Chris Nelson	3B	10	36	3	8	2	0	0	2	0	1	.222
Brent Lillibridge	UT	11	35	2	6	1	0	0	3	1	1	.171
Alberto González	UT	13	34	3	6	1	0	0	4	0	0	.176
J.R. Murphy	C	16	26	3	4	1	0	0	1	0	1	.154
Melky Mesa	OF	5	13	2	5	2	0	0	1	0	1	.385
Thomas Neal	OF	4	11	1	2	0	0	0	0	0	1	.182
Corban Joseph	IF	2	6	1	1	1	0	0	0	0	1	.167
Travis Ishikawa	IB	1	2	0	0	0	0	0	0	0	0	.000
Pitcher totals	—	162	20	0	0	0	0	0	1	0	0	.000
TOTALS	—	162	5449	650	1321	247	24	144	614	115	466	.242

=== Pitching ===
Note: POS = Position; W = Wins; L = Losses; ERA = Earned run average; G = Games pitched; GS = Games started; SV = Saves; IP = Innings pitched; H = Hits allowed; R = Runs allowed; ER = Earned runs allowed; BB = Walks allowed; SO = Strikeouts

Player	POS	W	L	ERA	G	GS	SV	IP	H	R	ER	BB	SO
CC Sabathia	SP	14	13	4.78	32	32	0	211.0	224	122	112	65	175
Hiroki Kuroda	SP	11	13	3.31	32	32	0	201.1	191	79	74	43	150
Andy Pettitte	SP	11	11	3.74	30	30	0	185.1	198	85	77	48	128
Phil Hughes	SP	4	14	5.19	30	29	0	145.2	170	91	84	42	121
Ivan Nova	SP	9	6	3.10	23	20	0	139.1	135	49	48	44	116
David Phelps	SP	6	5	4.98	22	12	0	86.2	88	50	48	35	79
Mariano Rivera	CL	6	2	2.11	64	0	44	64.0	58	16	15	9	54
David Robertson	RP	5	1	2.04	70	0	3	66.1	51	15	15	18	77
Shawn Kelley	RP	4	2	4.39	57	0	0	53.1	47	28	26	23	71
Joba Chamberlain	RP	2	1	4.93	45	0	1	42.0	47	23	23	26	38
Boone Logan	RP	5	2	3.23	61	0	0	39.0	33	15	14	13	50
Adam Warren	—	3	2	3.39	34	2	1	77.0	80	29	29	30	64
Preston Claiborne	—	0	2	4.11	44	0	0	50.1	51	23	23	14	42
David Huff	—	3	1	4.67	11	2	0	34.2	26	18	18	8	26
Vidal Nuño	—	1	2	2.25	5	3	0	20.0	16	5	5	6	9
Brett Marshall	—	0	0	4.50	3	0	0	12.0	13	6	6	7	7
Matt Daley	—	1	0	0.00	7	0	0	6.0	2	0	0	0	8
Dellin Betances	—	0	0	10.80	6	0	0	5.0	9	6	6	2	10
César Cabral	—	0	0	2.45	8	0	0	3.2	3	1	1	1	6
Cody Eppley	—	0	0	21.60	2	0	0	1.2	4	4	4	0	1
Jim Miller	—	0	0	20.25	1	0	0	1.1	3	3	3	1	0
Chris Bootcheck	—	0	0	9.00	1	0	0	1.0	2	1	1	2	1
Mike Zagurski	—	0	0	54.00	1	0	0	0.1	1	2	2	0	0
Alberto González	—	0	0	0.00	1	0	0	0.1	0	0	0	0	0
TOTALS	—	85	77	3.94	162	162	49	1447.1	1452	671	633	437	1233

== Season standings ==
=== American League East ===
AL East
Team	W	L	Pct.	GB	Home	Road
Boston Red Sox	97	65	.599	—	53‍–‍28	44‍–‍37
Tampa Bay Rays	92	71	.564	5½	51‍–‍30	41‍–‍41
New York Yankees	85	77	.525	12	46‍–‍35	39‍–‍42
Baltimore Orioles	85	77	.525	12	46‍–‍35	39‍–‍42
Toronto Blue Jays	74	88	.457	23	40‍–‍41	34‍–‍47

=== American League Wild Card ===
Division winners
Team	W	L	Pct.
Boston Red Sox	97	65	.599
Oakland Athletics	96	66	.593
Detroit Tigers	93	69	.574

Wild Card teams (Top 2 teams qualify for postseason)
Team	W	L	Pct.	GB
Cleveland Indians	92	70	.568	+½
Tampa Bay Rays	92	71	.564	—
Texas Rangers	91	72	.558	1
Kansas City Royals	86	76	.531	5½
New York Yankees	85	77	.525	6½
Baltimore Orioles	85	77	.525	6½
Los Angeles Angels	78	84	.481	13½
Toronto Blue Jays	74	88	.457	17½
Seattle Mariners	71	91	.438	20½
Minnesota Twins	66	96	.407	25½
Chicago White Sox	63	99	.389	28½
Houston Astros	51	111	.315	40½

=== Game log ===
Legend
Yankees Win	Yankees Loss	Game postponed

Game Log
April (16–10)

#	Date	Opponent	Score	Win	Loss	Save	Attendance	Record	Boxscore
1	April 1	Red Sox	2–8	Lester (1–0)	Sabathia (0–1)		49,514	0–1	L1
2	April 3	Red Sox	4–7	Buchholz (1–0)	Kuroda (0–1)	Hanrahan (1)	40,216	0–2	L2
3	April 4	Red Sox	4–2	Pettitte (1–0)	Dempster (0–1)	Rivera (1)	40,611	1–2	W1
4	April 5	@ Tigers	3–8	Fister (1–0)	Nova (0–1)	Smyly (1)	45,051	1–3	L1
5	April 6	@ Tigers	4–8	Scherzer (1–0)	Hughes (0–1)		42,453	1–4	L2
6	April 7	@ Tigers	7–0	Sabathia (1–1)	Verlander (1–1)		39,829	2–4	W1
7	April 8	@ Indians	11–6	Kuroda (1–1)	Jiménez (0–1)		41,567	3–4	W2
8	April 9	@ Indians	14–1	Pettitte (2–0)	Carrasco (0–1)		12,663	4–4	W3
–	April 10	@ Indians	Postponed (rain). Makeup Date May 13.						
–	April 11	@ Indians	Postponed (rain). Makeup Date May 13.						
9	April 12	Orioles	5–2	Sabathia (2–1)	González (1–1)	Rivera (2)	35,033	5–4	W4
10	April 13	Orioles	3–5	Hammel (2–1)	Hughes (0–2)	Johnson (5)	41,851	5–5	L1
11	April 14	Orioles	3–0	Kuroda (2–1)	Chen (0–2)		34,154	6–5	W1
12	April 16	Diamondbacks	4–2	Nova (1–1)	McCarthy (0–2)	Rivera (3)	34,107	7–5	W2
13	April 17	Diamondbacks	4–3	Sabathia (3–1)	Hernandez (0–1)	Rivera (4)	34,369	8–5	W3
14	April 18	Diamondbacks	2–6 (12)	Bell (1–0)	Phelps (0–1)		36,033	8–6	L1
15	April 19	@ Blue Jays	9–4	Pettitte (3–0)	Morrow (0–2)		40,028	9–6	W1
16	April 20	@ Blue Jays	5–3 (11)	Kelley (1–0)	Loup (1–1)	Rivera (5)	46,095	10–6	W2
17	April 21	@ Blue Jays	4–8	Cecil (1–0)	Logan (0–1)		45,575	10–7	L1
18	April 22	@ Rays	1–5	Moore (4–0)	Sabathia (3–2)		15,331	10–8	L2
19	April 23	@ Rays	4–3	Robertson (1–0)	Price (0–2)	Rivera (6)	17,644	11–8	W1
20	April 24	@ Rays	0–3	Cobb (3–1)	Pettitte (3–1)	Rodney (3)	19,177	11–9	L1
21	April 25	Blue Jays	5–3	Kuroda (3–1)	Buehrle (1–1)	Rivera (7)	31,445	12–9	W1
22	April 26	Blue Jays	6–4	Phelps (1–1)	Lincoln (0–1)	Rivera (8)	36,151	13–9	W2
23	April 27	Blue Jays	5–4	Sabathia (4–2)	Rogers (1–2)	Chamberlain (1)	40,258	14–9	W3
24	April 28	Blue Jays	3–2	Logan (1–1)	Dickey (2–4)	Rivera (9)	36,872	15–9	W4
25	April 29	Astros	1–9	Harrell (3–2)	Pettitte (3–2)		34,262	15–10	L1
26	April 30	Astros	7–4	Kuroda (4–1)	Humber (0–6)	Rivera (10)	34,301	16–10	W1

May (15–13)

#	Date	Opponent	Score	Win	Loss	Save	Attendance	Record	Boxscore
27	May 1	Astros	5–4	Logan (2–1)	Clemens (1–1)	Rivera (11)	34,117	17–10	W2
28	May 3	Athletics	0–2	Griffin (3–2)	Sabathia (4–3)	Balfour (4)	38,090	17–11	L1
29	May 4	Athletics	4–2	Hughes (1–2)	Colón (3–1)		41,349	18–11	W1
30	May 5	Athletics	4–5	Doolittle (2–0)	Logan (2–2)	Balfour (5)	38,134	18–12	L1
31	May 7	@ Rockies	0–2	de la Rosa (3–3)	Kuroda (4–2)	Betancourt (9)	41,595	18–13	L2
32	May 8	@ Rockies	3–2	Robertson (2–0)	Betancourt (1–1)	Rivera (12)	40,148	19–13	W1
33	May 9	@ Rockies	3–1	Warren (1–0)	Francis (1–3)	Rivera (13)	40,972	20–13	W2
34	May 10	@ Royals	11–6	Hughes (2–2)	Davis (2–3)		24,521	21–13	W3
35	May 11	@ Royals	3–2	Pettitte (4–2)	Shields (2–3)	Rivera (14)	30,910	22–13	W4
36	May 12	@ Royals	4–2	Kuroda (5–2)	Santana (3–2)	Rivera (15)	29,515	23–13	W5
37	May 13	@ Indians	0–1	Masterson (6–2)	Phelps (1–2)		23,299	23–14	L1
38	May 13	@ Indians	7–0	Nuño (1–0)	Bauer (1–2)	Warren (1)	23,299	24–14	W1
39	May 14	Mariners	4–3	Kelley (2–0)	Furbush (0–2)	Rivera (16)	41,267	25–14	W2
40	May 15	Mariners	2–12	Iwakuma (5–1)	Hughes (2–3)		34,081	25–15	L1
41	May 16	Mariners	2–3	Pérez (1–0)	Pettitte (4–3)	Wilhelmsen (11)	35,392	25–16	L2
42	May 17	Blue Jays	5–0	Kuroda (6–2)	Buehrle (1–3)		40,008	26–16	W1
43	May 18	Blue Jays	7–2	Phelps (2–2)	Morrow (1–3)		45,577	27–16	W2
–	May 19	Blue Jays	Postponed (rain).						
44	May 20	@ Orioles	6–4 (10)	Robertson (3–0)	Strop (0–2)	Rivera (17)	24,133	28–16	W3
45	May 21	@ Orioles	2–3 (10)	Johnson (2–4)	Nuño (1–1)		29,040	28–17	L1
46	May 22	@ Orioles	3–6	Hammel (6–2)	Kuroda (6–3)		26,725	28–18	L2
47	May 24	@ Rays	9–4	Phelps (3–2)	Hernández (2–5)		17,825	29–18	W1
48	May 25	@ Rays	4–3 (11)	Nova (2–1)	Lueke (0–2)	Rivera (18)	25,874	30–18	W2
49	May 26	@ Rays	3–8	Cobb (6–2)	Sabathia (4–4)		24,159	30–19	L1
50	May 27	@ Mets	1–2	Lyon (2–2)	Robertson (3–1)	Parnell (8)	32,911	30–20	L2
51	May 28	@ Mets	1–2	Rice (3–3)	Rivera (0–1)		31,877	30–21	L3
52	May 29	Mets	4–9	Hefner (1–5)	Phelps (3–3)		43,681	30–22	L4
53	May 30	Mets	1–3	Gee (3–6)	Nuño (1–2)	Parnell (9)	44,207	30–23	L5
54	May 31	Red Sox	4–1	Sabathia (5–4)	Lester (6–2)	Rivera (19)	45,141	31–23	W1

June (11–16)

#	Date	Opponent	Score	Win	Loss	Save	Attendance	Record	Boxscore
55	June 1	Red Sox	1–11	Doubront (4–2)	Hughes (2–4)		48,784	31–24	L1
56	June 2	Red Sox	0–3	Buchholz (8–0)	Kuroda (6–4)		43,613	31–25	L2
57	June 3	Indians	7–4	Kelley (3–0)	Masterson (8–4)	Rivera (20)	40,007	32–25	W1
58	June 4	Indians	4–3	Phelps (4–3)	Kazmir (3–3)	Rivera (21)	36,208	33–25	W2
59	June 5	Indians	6–4	Sabathia (6–4)	Kluber (3–4)		42,477	34–25	W3
60	June 6	@ Mariners	6–1	Hughes (3–4)	Harang (2–6)		18,776	35–25	W4
61	June 7	@ Mariners	1–4	Bonderman (1–1)	Kuroda (6–5)	Wilhelmsen (15)	26,248	35–26	L1
62	June 8	@ Mariners	3–1	Pettitte (5–3)	Saunders (4–6)	Rivera (22)	38,252	36–26	W1
63	June 9	@ Mariners	2–1	Robertson (4–1)	Medina (1–2)	Rivera (23)	43,389	37–26	W2
64	June 11	@ Athletics	4–6	Colón (8–2)	Sabathia (6–5)	Balfour (16)	27,118	37–27	L1
64	June 11	@ Athletics	2–5	Straily (4–2)	Hughes (3–5)	Balfour (17)	25,176	37–28	L2
66	June 13	@ Athletics	2–3 (18)	Chavez (1–0)	Claiborne (0–1)		27,569	37–29	L3
67	June 14	@ Angels	2–5	Wilson (5–5)	Pettitte (5–4)	Frieri (15)	40,621	37–30	L4
68	June 15	@ Angels	2–6	Hanson (4–2)	Phelps (4–4)		40,486	37–31	L5
69	June 16	@ Angels	6–5	Sabathia (7–5)	Weaver (1–3)	Rivera (24)	41,204	38–31	W1
–	June 18	Dodgers	Postponed (rain). Makeup Date June 19.						
70	June 19	Dodgers	6–4	Kuroda (7–5)	Ryu (6–3)	Rivera (25)	40,604	39–31	W2
71	June 19	Dodgers	0–6	Capuano (2–4)	Hughes (3–6)		41,320	39–32	L1
72	June 20	Rays	3–8	Moore (9–3)	Pettitte (5–5)		37,649	39–33	L2
73	June 21	Rays	6–2	Phelps (5–4)	Hernández (4–8)		41,123	40–33	W1
74	June 22	Rays	7–5	Sabathia (8–5)	Peralta (1–4)	Rivera (26)	48,013	41–33	W2
75	June 23	Rays	1–3	Archer (2–3)	Nova (2–2)	Rodney (15)	46,054	41–34	L1
76	June 25	Rangers	4–3	Rivera (1–1)	Scheppers (5–1)		41,674	42–34	W1
77	June 26	Rangers	5–8	Grimm (7–5)	Pettitte (5–6)	Nathan (26)	38,264	42–35	L1
78	June 27	Rangers	0–2	Holland (6–4)	Hughes (3–7)		42,138	42–36	L2
79	June 28	@ Orioles	3–4	Gausman (1–3)	Sabathia (8–6)	Hunter (2)	40,041	42–37	L3
80	June 29	@ Orioles	3–11	Britton (2–2)	Phelps (5–5)		46,607	42–38	L4
81	June 30	@ Orioles	2–4	Tillman (10–2)	Kuroda (7–6)	Johnson (28)	40,878	42–39	L5

July (14–12)

#	Date	Opponent	Score	Win	Loss	Save	Attendance	Record	Boxscore
82	July 1	@ Twins	10–4	Chamberlain (1–0)	Burton (1–6)		29,619	43–39	W1
83	July 2	@ Twins	7–3	Hughes (4–7)	Deduno (4–3)	Rivera (27)	29,029	44–39	W2
84	July 3	@ Twins	3–2	Sabathia (9–6)	Walters (2–5)	Rivera (28)	38,457	45–39	W3
85	July 4	@ Twins	9–5	Phelps (6–5)	Gibson (1–1)		38,260	46–39	W4
86	July 5	Orioles	3–2	Nova (3–2)	Johnson (2–7)		43,396	47–39	W5
87	July 6	Orioles	5–4	Pettitte (6–6)	Tillman (10–3)	Rivera (29)	42,678	48–39	W6
88	July 7	Orioles	1–2	O'Day (5–0)	Rivera (1–2)	Johnson (30)	40,218	48–40	L1
89	July 8	Royals	1–5	Guthrie (8–6)	Hughes (4–8)	Holland (21)	35,057	48–41	L2
90	July 9	Royals	1–3	Shields (4–6)	Sabathia (9–7)	Holland (22)	35,797	48–42	L3
91	July 10	Royals	8–1	Nova (4–2)	Davis (4–8)		35,781	49–42	W1
92	July 11	Royals	8–4	Pettitte (7–6)	Santana (5–6)		40,381	50–42	W2
93	July 12	Twins	2–0	Kuroda (8–6)	Pressly (2–2)	Rivera (30)	40,247	51–42	W3
94	July 13	Twins	1–4	Deduno (5–4)	Hughes (4–9)	Perkins (21)	40,301	51–43	L1
95	July 14	Twins	4–10	Gibson (2–2)	Sabathia (9–8)		43,131	51–44	L2
All-Star Break: AL defeats NL 3–0
96	July 19	@ Red Sox	2–4	Doubront (7–3)	Pettitte (7–7)	Uehara (9)	38,130	51–45	L3
97	July 20	@ Red Sox	5–2	Kuroda (9–6)	Lackey (7–7)	Rivera (31)	37,601	52–45	W1
98	July 21	@ Red Sox	7–8 (11)	Beato (1–0)	Warren (1–1)		38,138	52–46	L1
99	July 22	@ Rangers	0–3	Darvish (9–4)	Nova (4–3)	Nathan (31)	42,058	52–47	L2
100	July 23	@ Rangers	5–4	Chamberlain (2–0)	Nathan (1–1)	Rivera (32)	42,739	53–47	W1
101	July 24	@ Rangers	1–3	Garza (7–1)	Pettitte (7–8)	Nathan (32)	42,360	53–48	L1
102	July 25	@ Rangers	2–0	Kuroda (10–6)	Holland (8–6)	Rivera (33)	35,139	54–48	W1
103	July 26	Rays	6–10	Hellickson (10–3)	Sabathia (9–9)	Rodney (25)	44,486	54–49	L1
104	July 27	Rays	0–1	Archer (6–3)	Nova (4–4)		43,424	54–50	L2
105	July 28	Rays	6–5	Rivera (2–2)	McGee (2–3)		47,714	55–50	W1
106	July 30	@ Dodgers	3–2	Jansen (4–3)	Kelley (3–1)		52,447	55–51	L1
107	July 31	@ Dodgers	3–0	Logan (3–2)	Belisario (4–6)	Rivera (34)	53,013	56–51	W1

August (16–12)

#	Date	Opponent	Score	Win	Loss	Save	Attendance	Record	Boxscore
108	August 2	@ Padres	2–7	Cashner (8–5)	Sabathia (9–10)		44,124	56–52	L1
109	August 3	@ Padres	3–0	Nova (5–4)	Ross (2–5)	Rivera (35)	44,184	57–52	W1
110	August 4	@ Padres	3–6	Kennedy (4–8)	Hughes (4–10)	Street (21)	43,504	57–53	L1
111	August 5	@ White Sox	1–8	Quintana (6–3)	Pettitte (7–9)		27,948	57–54	L2
112	August 6	@ White Sox	2–3	Sale (7–11)	Kuroda (10–7)	Reed (27)	23,826	57–55	L3
113	August 7	@ White Sox	5–6 (12)	Axelrod (4–8)	Warren (1–2)		25,707	57–56	L4
114	August 9	Tigers	4–3 (10)	Kelley (4–1)	Alburquerque (2–3)		46,545	58–56	W1
115	August 10	Tigers	3–9	Sánchez (10–7)	Hughes (4–11)		45,728	58–57	L1
116	August 11	Tigers	5–4	Rivera (3–2)	Veras (0–5)		42,439	59–57	W1
117	August 12	Angels	2–1	Kuroda (11–7)	Richards (3–5)	Robertson (1)	37,146	60–57	W2
118	August 13	Angels	14–7	Sabathia (10–10)	Vargas (6–5)		35,013	61–57	W3
119	August 14	Angels	11–3	Nova (6–4)	Weaver (7–6)		38,379	62–57	W4
120	August 15	Angels	4–8	Wilson (13–6)	Hughes (4–12)		44,682	62–58	L1
121	August 16	@ Red Sox	10–3	Pettitte (8–9)	Doubront (8–6)		38,143	63–58	W1
122	August 17	@ Red Sox	1–6	Lackey (8–10)	Kuroda (11–8)		37,517	63–59	L1
123	August 18	@ Red Sox	9–6	Sabathia (11–10)	Dempster (6–9)	Rivera (36)	37,917	64–59	W1
124	August 20	Blue Jays	8–4	Nova (7–4)	Wagner (2–4)		40,248	65–59	W2
125	August 20	Blue Jays	3–2	Rivera (4–2)	Oliver (3–4)		37,190	66–59	W3
126	August 21	Blue Jays	4–2	Huff (1–0)	Dickey (9–12)	Rivera (37)	36,140	67–59	W4
127	August 22	Blue Jays	5–3	Pettitte (9–9)	Happ (3–3)	Robertson (2)	40,116	68–59	W5
128	August 23	@ Rays	2–7	Archer (7–5)	Kuroda (11–9)		24,239	68–60	L1
129	August 24	@ Rays	2–4	Price (8–5)	Sabathia (11–11)	Rodney (30)	32,862	68–61	L2
130	August 25	@ Rays	3–2	Logan (4–2)	Wright (2–2)	Rivera (38)	34,078	69–61	W1
131	August 26	@ Blue Jays	2–5	Dickey (10–12)	Hughes (4–13)	Janssen (24)	35,241	69–62	L1
132	August 27	@ Blue Jays	7–1	Pettitte (10–9)	Happ (3–4)		34,047	70–62	W1
133	August 28	@ Blue Jays	2–7	Redmond (2–2)	Kuroda (11–10)		36,565	70–63	L1
134	August 30	Orioles	8–5	Sabathia (12–11)	González (8–7)	Rivera (39)	45,169	71–63	W1
135	August 31	Orioles	2–0	Nova (8–4)	Feldman (4–4)		42,836	72–63	W2

September (13–14)

#	Date	Opponent	Score	Win	Loss	Save	Attendance	Record	Boxscore
136	September 1	Orioles	3–7	Gausman (2–3)	Kelley (4–2)		40,361	72–64	L1
137	September 2	White Sox	9–1	Huff (2–0)	Quintana (7–5)		40,125	73–64	W1
138	September 3	White Sox	6–4	Logan (5–2)	Jones (4–5)	Rivera (40)	33,215	74–64	W2
139	September 4	White Sox	6–5	Sabathia (13–11)	Johnson (0–1)	Rivera (41)	36,082	75–64	W3
140	September 5	Red Sox	8–9	Breslow (5–2)	Chamberlain (2–1)	Uehara (18)	40,481	75–65	L1
141	September 6	Red Sox	8–12	Workman (5–2)	Claiborne (0–2)		44,117	75–66	L2
142	September 7	Red Sox	9–13	Lackey (9–12)	Huff (2–1)		49,046	75–67	L3
143	September 8	Red Sox	4–3	Rivera (5–2)	Workman (5–3)		43,078	76–67	W1
144	September 9	@ Orioles	2–4	Tillman (16–5)	Sabathia (13–12)	Johnson (43)	17,456	76–68	L1
145	September 10	@ Orioles	7–5	Warren (2–2)	Gausman (2–5)	Rivera (42)	25,697	77–68	W1
146	September 11	@ Orioles	5–4	Robertson (5–1)	Hunter (4–4)	Rivera (43)	20,141	78–68	W2
147	September 12	@ Orioles	6–5	Rivera (6–2)	Johnson (3–8)		24,659	79–68	W3
148	September 13	@ Red Sox	4–8	Workman (6–3)	Kuroda (11–11)		37,542	79–69	L1
149	September 14	@ Red Sox	1–5	Lester (14–8)	Sabathia (13–13)		37,510	79–70	L2
150	September 15	@ Red Sox	2–9	Buchholz (11–0)	Nova (8–5)		37,137	79–71	L3
151	September 17	@ Blue Jays	0–2	Dickey (13–12)	Pettitte (10–10)	Janssen (31)	24,894	79–72	L4
152	September 18	@ Blue Jays	4–3	Huff (3–1)	Delabar (5–5)	Rivera (44)	24,247	80–72	W1
153	September 19	@ Blue Jays	2–6	Redmond (4–2)	Kuroda (11–12)	Janssen (32)	32,003	80–73	L1
154	September 20	Giants	5–1	Sabathia (14–13)	Lincecum (10–14)		41,734	81–73	W1
155	September 21	Giants	6–0	Nova (9–5)	Vogelsong (3–6)		42,420	82–73	W2
156	September 22	Giants	1–2	Lopez (4–2)	Pettitte (10–11)	Romo (36)	49,197	82–74	L1
157	September 24	Rays	0–7	Moore (16–4)	Kuroda (11–13)	Odorizzi (1)	43,407	82–75	L2
158	September 25	Rays	3–8	Price (9–8)	Hughes (4–14)		37,260	82–76	L3
159	September 26	Rays	0–4	Cobb (11–3)	Nova (9–6)		48,675	82–77	L4
160	September 27	@ Astros	3–2	Warren (3–2)	Oberholtzer (4–5)	Robertson (3)	29,486	83–77	W1
161	September 28	@ Astros	2–1	Pettitte (11–11)	Clemens (4–7)		37,199	84–77	W2
162	September 29	@ Astros	5–1 (14)	Daley (1–0)	Harrell (6–17)		40,542	85–77	W3

=== Detailed records ===
American League
Opponent	Home	Away	Total	Pct.
AL East
Baltimore Orioles	6–3	4–6	10–9	.526
Boston Red Sox	3–7	3–6	6–13	.316
Tampa Bay Rays	3–7	4–5	7–12	.368
Toronto Blue Jays	10–0	4–5	14–5	.737
	22–17	15–22	37–39	.487
AL Central
Chicago White Sox	3–0	0–3	3–3	.500
Cleveland Indians	3–0	3–1	6–1	.857
Detroit Tigers	2–1	1–2	3–3	.500
Kansas City Royals	2–2	3–0	5–2	.714
Minnesota Twins	1–2	4–0	5–2	.714
	11–5	11–6	22–11	.667
AL West
Houston Astros	2–1	3–0	5–1	.833
Los Angeles Angels	3–1	1–2	4–3	.571
Oakland Athletics	1–2	0–3	1–5	.167
Seattle Mariners	1–2	3–1	4–3	.571
Texas Rangers	1–2	2–2	3–4	.429
	8–8	9–8	17–16	.515

Interleague Play
Opponent	Home	Away	Total	Pct.
Arizona Diamondbacks	2–1	—	2–1	.667
Colorado Rockies	—	2–1	2–1	.667
Los Angeles Dodgers	1–1	1–1	2–2	.500
New York Mets	0–2	0–2	0–4	.000
San Diego Padres	—	1–2	1–2	.333
San Francisco Giants	2–1	—	2–1	.667
	5–5	4–6	9–11	.450

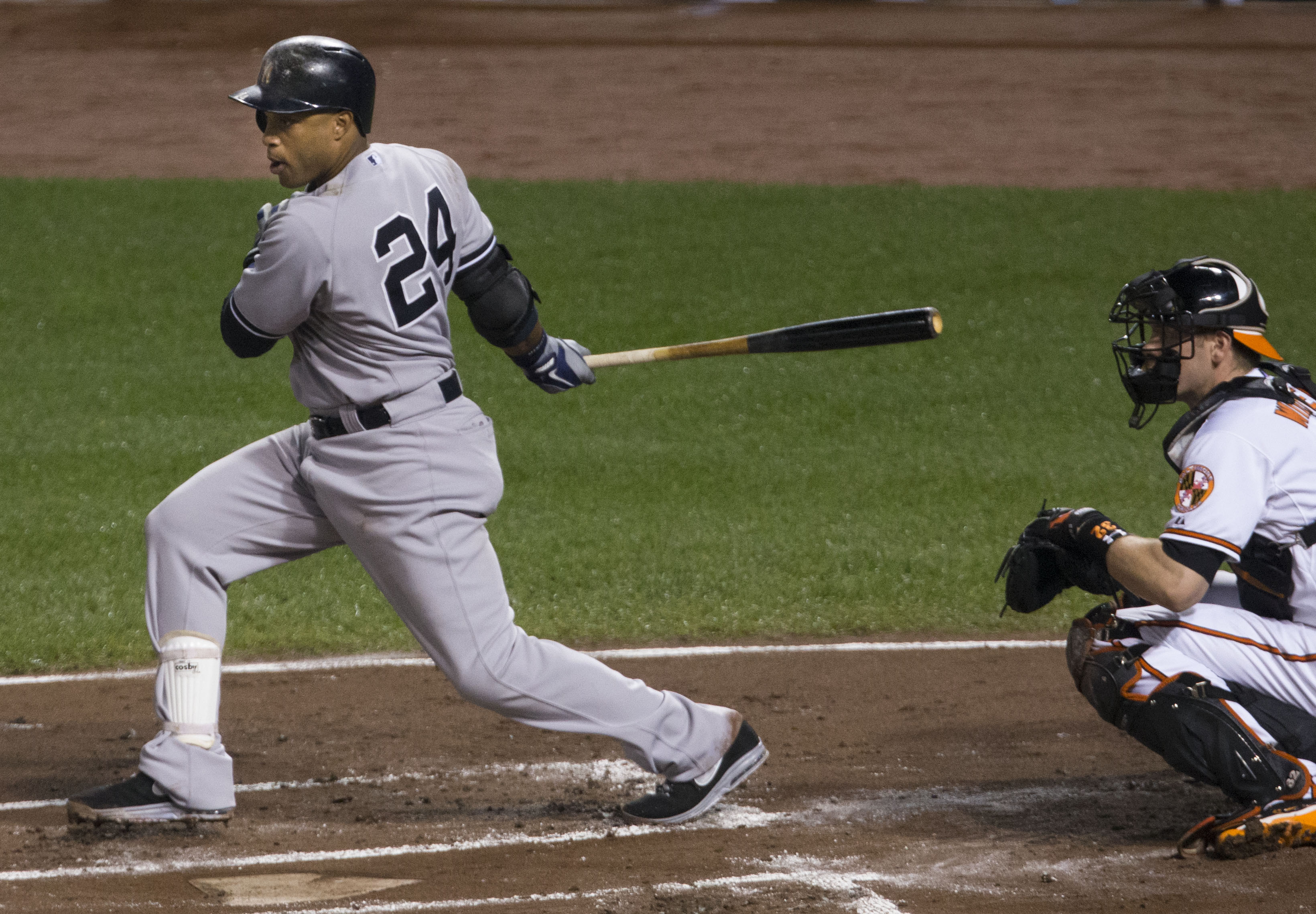
Robinson Canó played his final season with the New York Yankees in 2013 before signing a long-term deal with the Seattle Mariners at the end of the season.

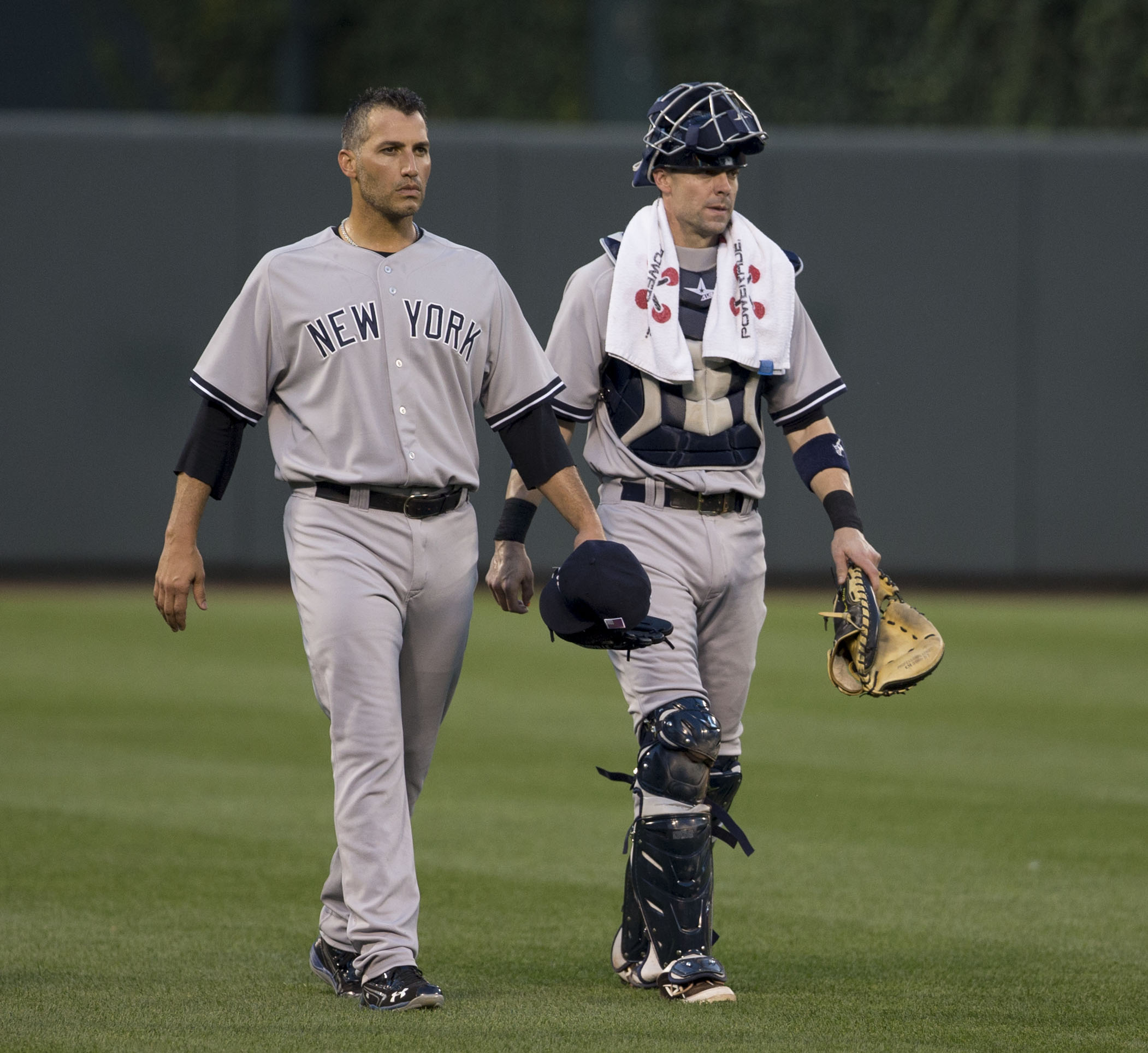
Andy Pettitte and Chris Stewart on September 11, 2013.

2013 American League record Source: MLB Standings Grid – 2013
Team	BAL	BOS	CWS	CLE	DET	HOU	KC	LAA	MIN	NYY	OAK	SEA	TB	TEX	TOR	NL
Baltimore	—	11–8	4–3	3–4	4–2	4–2	3–4	5–2	3–3	9–10	5–2	2–4	6–13	5–2	10–9	11–9
Boston	8–11	—	4–2	6–1	3–4	6–1	2–5	3–3	4–3	13–6	3–3	6–1	12–7	2–4	11–8	14–6
Chicago	3–4	2–4	—	2–17	7–12	3–4	9–10	3–4	8–11	3–3	2–5	3–3	2–5	4–2	4–3	8–12
Cleveland	4–3	1–6	17–2	—	4–15	6–1	10–9	4–2	13–6	1–6	5–2	5–2	2–4	5–1	4–2	11–9
Detroit	2–4	4–3	12–7	15–4	—	6–1	9–10	0–6	11–8	3–3	3–4	5–2	3–3	3–4	5–2	12–8
Houston	2–4	1–6	4–3	1–6	1–6	—	2–4	10–9	1–5	1–5	4–15	9–10	2–5	2–17	3–4	8–12
Kansas City	4–3	5–2	10–9	9–10	10–9	4–2	—	2–5	15–4	2–5	1–5	4–3	6–1	3–3	2–4	9–11
Los Angeles	2–5	3–3	4–3	2–4	6–0	9–10	5–2	—	1–5	3–4	8–11	11–8	4–3	4–15	6–1	10–10
Minnesota	3–3	3–4	11–8	6–13	8–11	5–1	4–15	5–1	—	2–5	1–6	4–3	1–6	4–3	1–5	8–12
New York	10–9	6–13	3–3	6–1	3–3	5–1	5–2	4–3	5–2	—	1–5	4–3	7–12	3–4	14–5	9–11
Oakland	2–5	3–3	5–2	2–5	4–3	15–4	5–1	11–8	6–1	5–1	—	8–11	3–3	10–9	4–3	13–7
Seattle	4–2	1–6	3–3	2–5	2–5	10–9	3–4	8–11	3–4	3–4	11–8	—	3–3	7–12	3–3	8–12
Tampa Bay	13–6	7–12	5–2	4–2	3–3	5–2	1–6	3–4	6–1	12–7	3–3	3–3	—	4–4	11–8	12–8
Texas	2–5	4–2	2–4	1–5	4–3	17–2	3–3	15–4	3–4	4–3	9–10	12–7	4–4	—	1–6	10–10
Toronto	9–10	8–11	3–4	2–4	2–5	4–3	4–2	1–6	5–1	5–14	3–4	3–3	8–11	6–1	—	11–9

== Farm system ==
Level	Team	League	Manager
AAA	Scranton/Wilkes-Barre RailRiders	International League	Dave Miley
AA	Trenton Thunder	Eastern League	Tony Franklin
A	Tampa Yankees	Florida State League	Luis Sojo
A	Charleston RiverDogs	South Atlantic League	Al Pedrique
A-Short Season	Staten Island Yankees	New York–Penn League	Justin Pope
Rookie	GCL Yankees 1	Gulf Coast League	Tom Nieto
Rookie	GCL Yankees 2	Gulf Coast League	Mario Garza

LEAGUE CHAMPIONS: Trenton
