= Conservation Board =

Conservation Board may refer to:

- Conservation Board (New Zealand), boards around New Zealand that provide for interaction between the public and Department of Conservation
- Colorado Water Conservation Board, a division of the Colorado Department of Natural Resources
- Energy Resources Conservation Board, an independent, quasi-judicial agency of the Government of Alberta
- Sussex Downs Conservation Board, an English local government organisation to promote and manage the Sussex Downs Area of Outstanding Natural Beauty
- Texas State Soil and Water Conservation Board, a state agency that enforces the Texas's soil and water conservation laws
- Western Cape Nature Conservation Board, governmental organisation responsible for maintaining wilderness areas and public nature reserves in Western Cape Province, South Africa
