= Goose Creek Consolidated Independent School District =

School district in Texas, United States

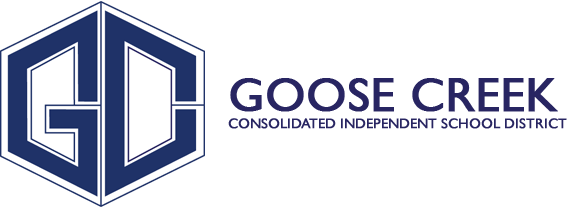

Location
- 4544 Interstate 10 Service Rd Baytown, 77520; United States
- Coordinates: 29.802490°N 94.989690°W

District information
- Type: Independent school district
- Motto: Developing the Whole Child
- Grades: Pre-K – 12^{th}
- Established: 1919
- Superintendent: Dr. Randal O'Brien
- Schools: 34
- Budget: US $293.9 mil. (2019-20)
- NCES District ID: 4821150

Students and staff
- Students: 24,108 (2023–2024)
- Teachers: 1,616.13 (on an FTE basis) (2023–2024)
- Staff: 2,118.81 (on an FTE basis) (2023–2024)
- Student–teacher ratio: 14.92 (2023–2024)

Other information
- Website: www.gccisd.net

Goose Creek Consolidated Independent School District (GCCISD) is a school district headquartered in Baytown, Texas, United States.

The district has 18 elementary schools, 6 junior high schools (6-8), 3 high schools (9-12), a career center, and two alternative centers for education. The district serves all of Baytown, Highlands, Coady, McNair, outlying areas of East Harris County, and a small portion of West Chambers County. The district has a total enrollment of 23,765 students and 1,534 staff. The district's total actual budget for 2019-2020 is US$293.9 million.

In 2009, the school district was rated "academically acceptable" by the Texas Education Agency.

== History ==
Goose Creek Independent School District was organized in 1919 and served the tri-cities of Pelly, Goose Creek, and Baytown. The district launched its first building program in 1921 with the passing of a $200,000 bond issue for the purchase of land and construction of five schools.

In 1938 the Highlands community, previously in Crosby ISD, joined the Goose Creek district.

Robert E. Lee High School opened in 1928 and was named in honor of Robert E. Lee, the military commander of the Confedererate Army.

In 1954, Goose Creek ISD consolidated with Cedar Bayou ISD to form Goose Creek Consolidated Independent School District (GCCISD).

GCCISD became desegregated in 1967 and George Washington Carver High School was closed.

In 2002 the district changed scheduling for all schools.

== Academic Performance ==
2022-2023 TAPR report; According to the 03/01/2024 Baytown Sun article, "Goose Creek ISD Underwhelms In Performance Report" "Based on the Texas Academic Performance Reports that were presented at the Feb. 5 school board meeting, the scores from standardized academic tests indicate Goose Creek ISD is behind the region and state in academics for the 2022-2023 reporting period. The administration did not give a reason for this disparity." The full TAPR report from the TEA can be viewed here.

== Infrastructure ==
For several years of research and debate, voters passed a $120 million bond referendum in 2005 to improve present facilities, replace several existing schools, and build new ones. Included in this package is a third high school (which was included in a 1999 referendum, but never materialized) named Goose Creek Memorial that opened in Fall 2008. Additionally, Victoria Walker Elementary was opened in fall 2007, with plans for a 16th elementary to be drawn. Both new schools are situated in the north area of Baytown which has seen the most growth in recent years. Highlands Junior High and Bowie Elementary were replaced under the bond program. After the opening of Goose Creek Memorial, Lee High School will be reformatted to a smaller campus and the auxiliary campus will be converted to its original purpose as an alternative educational center. Additionally, the district added new classrooms and improved its football stadium.

GCCISD's Stallworth Stadium is the home for varsity football and soccer for GCCISD as well as for the annual Bayou Bowl. It seats approximately 16,000 fans, making it one of the largest high school sports venues in the nation.

== Student demographics ==
For the 2018–2019 school year the district reported a total enrollment of 23,765

=== Ethnicity ===
- 62.5% were Hispanic American/Hispanic
- 18.3% were White American/White
- 15.2% were African American/Black
- 1.6% were Asian American/Asian

=== Risk factors ===
- 54.1% were at risk of dropping out of school
- 69.3% were economically disadvantaged

== Coverage area ==
=== Cities ===
GCCISD covers all of the following municipalities:

- Baytown
- Highlands

== Board members ==
As of mid-2020, the members of the GCCISD Board of Trustees are:

- District I: Howard Sampson
- District II: Mercedes Renteria (Assistant Secretary)
- District III: James Campisi (Secretary)
- District IV: Richard Clem
- District V: Helen Berrott-Tims (President)
- District VI: Tiffany Guy (Vice President)
- District VII: Jessie Martinez

Contact page https://www.gccisd.net/page/BOARD.home

== The Goose Call podcast ==
In August 2020, Goose Creek CISD introduced the Goose Call audio podcast to discuss important issues in the district. The podcast is mainly discuss the COVID-19 and return to school. The Goose Call is hosted by Matthew Bolinger and Kendall David and produced by Carrie Pryor-Newman. It is available on iTunes and Podbean.

=== Episodes ===
#	Series	Date	Title	Guests
1	Safe Return To School Plan	August 5, 2020	Safe Return To School Plan–Part One	Dr. Randal O’Brien-Superintendent of Schools, Karen Thomas-Area Executive Director, and Steve Koester-Director of Educational Technology.
2	Safe Return To School Plan	August 12, 2020	Safe Return To School Plan–Part Two	Stephanie Myers-district benefits coordinator, Rick Walterscheid-director of transportation, and Patricia Pena-health services coordinator.
3	Safe Return To School Plan	August 13, 2020	Safe Return to School Plan–Part 3	Dr. Marissa Moreno-GCCISD parent, Shelia Circello-GCCISD teacher, Evan Kerr-GCCISD senior student, and Victoria Boodell-GCCISD 8th grade student.
4	No Series	August 25, 2020	COVID Task Force	Christi Leath, Director of Advanced Academics and Special Projects for Goose Creek CISD.
5	No Series	September 14, 2020	Growth and Development in GCCISD and the City of Baytown	Mayor of Baytown, Brandon Capetillo, and Deputy Superintendent of Administrative Services, Dr. Demetrius McCall.
6	Friday Night Lights	October 16, 2020	GCM Football and Volleyball	The head football coach and athletic coordinator at GCM, Shannon Carter, and new head volleyball coach, Michael Williams.
7	Friday Night Lights	October 16, 2020	Lee Football and Volleyball	The head football coach and athletic coordinator at Lee High School, Timothy Finn, and head volleyball coach, Mary Grosjean.
8	Friday Night Lights	October 16, 2020	Sterling Football and Volleyball	Head football coach and athletic director at Sterling, Robert Toomer, and head volleyball coach, Candace Southall.
9	No Series	November 19, 2020	Happy College Week: A Guide for College Readiness	AVID coordinator, Misty Dolgner and College and Career Counselor, Kim Mitchell. Former Goose Creek students, Victoria and MiUnique, and current senior, Avil.
10	No Series	January 21, 2021	Rezoning and E. F. Green Junior School: Get to Know Principal Brooks!	Dr. McCall, Deputy Superintendent of Administrative Services and Mr. Brooks, the new principal of E. F. Green Junior School.
11	No Series	February 25, 2021	Celebrating Black History Month	Dr. Regina Patrick Sims (principal at Bowie Elementary), Diztorsha Levan (teacher at Goose Creek Memorial High School), and Roger Joseph (senior student at Goose Creek Memorial High School).

== Schools ==
=== High Schools (Grades 9-12) ===
Traditional Campuses (5-A)

- Robert E. Lee High School
- Ross S. Sterling High School
- Goose Creek Memorial High School

Early College Campuses (not UIL Affiliated)

- Impact Early College High School
- Stuart Career Tech High School

=== Junior High Schools (Grades 6-8) ===
- Baytown Junior High School
- Cedar Bayou Junior High School
- Edward Franklin "E.F." Green Junior High School
- George H. Gentry Junior High School
- Highlands Junior High School (Highlands)
- Horace Mann Junior High School

=== Elementary Schools (Grades PK-5) ===
Grades PK-5

- Alamo Elementary School
- James Bowie Elementary School
- George Washington Carver Elementary School
- David Crockett Elementary School (2003 National Blue Ribbon School)
- Lorenzo de Zavala Elementary School
- Harlem Elementary School
- Mirabeau B. Lamar Elementary School
- Jessie Lee Pumphrey Elementary School
- San Jacinto Elementary School
- Ashbel Smith Elementary School
- William B. Travis Elementary School
- Victoria Walker Elementary School
- Johnny T. Clark Jr. Elementary School
- Dr. Antonio Banuelos Elementary School
- Stephen F. Austin Elementary School

Grades 1-5

- Highlands Elementary School (Highlands)

Grades PK-1

- Bonnie P. Hopper Primary School (Highlands)

=== Early Learning ===
- Sheila C. Liles Early Learning Academy

=== Alternative Education ===
- POINT Alternative Center
- Peter E. Hyland Center
