= Cedar Bayou, Texas =

Area in Texas, US

Coordinates: 29°46′32″N 94°56′32″W

Cedar Bayou is an area in east central Harris County, Texas, United States.

Some of the area is unincorporated; portions are within Baytown. Cedar Bayou has recently broken the record for the most rainfall in the continental United States, during Hurricane Harvey.

== Education ==
Goose Creek Independent School District operates schools in the area.

== Watershed character and water quality ==
Cedar Bayou, the area's namesake water body, is a slow moving coastal waterway with both tidal and non-tidal reaches. Its watershed originates north of Highway 90, between Lake Houston and Dayton. The upper reaches of the Bayou's watershed are primarily rural or agricultural, with large undeveloped/wooded areas in its middle, and urban areas (including the urban center of Baytown) in the lower reaches. The mouth of the Bayou widens into a series of small lakes before flowing into the Galveston Bay system.

Cedar Bayou is listed as being impaired for certain water quality issues, including bacteria, impaired macrobenthic communities, and PCBs and dioxins in edible fish tissue. In response to these issues and other local concerns, the Texas State Soil and Water Conservation Board and the Houston-Galveston Area Council are working with local partners, organizations, and residents to create a watershed protection plan. This non-regulatory process will provide local stakeholders with the ability to address these issues.
