= Tomur Barnes =

American football player (born 1970)

No. 22, 23, 32
- Position: Cornerback

Personal information
- Born: September 8, 1970 (age 56); McNair, Texas, U.S.
- Listed height: 5 ft 10 in (1.78 m)
- Listed weight: 188 lb (85 kg)

Career information
- College: North Texas
- NFL draft: 1993: undrafted

Career history
- San Francisco 49ers (1993–1994)*; Houston Oilers (1994–1996); Minnesota Vikings (1996); Washington Redskins (1996); Tennessee Oilers (1997); Denver Broncos (1998)*
- * Offseason or practice squad member only
- Stats at Pro Football Reference

Tomur Barnes (born September 8, 1970) is an American former professional football player who was a cornerback in the National Football League for the Houston/Tennessee Oilers, Minnesota Vikings, and the Washington Redskins. He played college football for the North Texas Mean Green.
