= Stallworth Stadium =

Stadium in Baytown, Texas

Coordinates: 29.7926303°N 94.9394274°W

Stallworth Stadium is a stadium in Baytown, Texas. It is primarily used for American football and soccer and is the home field of Robert E. Lee High School, Ross S. Sterling High School, and Goose Creek Memorial High School. All three schools are in the Goose Creek Consolidated Independent School District.

The stadium holds 16,500 people and opened in 1969 when Memorial Stadium (now Sultis Stadium) on the Robert E. Lee campus became too small. Stallworth Stadium is on a neutral site and not on any of the three campuses in GCCISD.

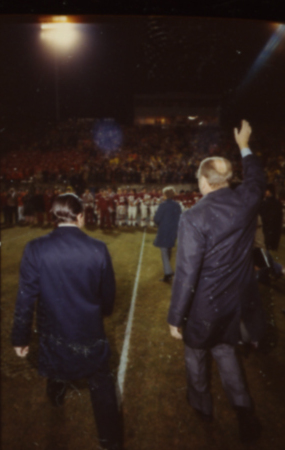
President Gerald Ford waving towards the stands in the Stadium.

On October 29, 1976, President Gerald Ford attended a game between the Robert E. Lee Ganders and the Aldine-McArthur Generals. The President, on the campaign trail in Houston, stayed long enough to see the Ganders reach a 21–0 lead over the Generals en route to a 34–0 victory.

In addition, the Bayou Bowl, a high school all-star game between players from Louisiana and Texas, takes place annually at the venue. Starting in 2006, the stadium is occasionally used for middle school football games.

The stadium was also the home of the Baytown chapter of The American Cancer Society's Bay Area Relay for Life until it moved to Royal Purple Raceway, due to the GCCISD bus barn in the stadium's parking lot.

The stadium is among the largest non-collegiate fields in the state.

The stadium is named after Robert E. Lee High School coach Dan Stallworth.

Stallworth Stadium is among the largest high school football stadiums by capacity in Texas:

Location	Stadium	Capacity
Mesquite	Memorial Stadium	19,400
Corpus Christi	Buccaneer Stadium	18,000
Baytown	Stallworth Stadium	16,000
McAllen	McAllen Veterans Memorial Stadium	13,500
Carrollton	Tommy Standridge Stadium	13,000
Irving	Joy and Ralph Ellis Stadium	12,500
Bedford	Pennington Field	12,500
San Benito	Bobby Morrow Stadium	12,000
Austin	Burger Stadium	12,000
Denton	CH Collins Stadium	12,000
Houston	Jones-Cowart Stadium	12,000
Pasadena	Veterans Memorial Stadium	12,000
Cypress	Cy-Fair FCU Stadium	11,000
Austin	Kelly Reeves Stadium	11,000
Commerce	Memorial Stadium	11,000
San Antonio	Dub Farris Stadium	10,000
Dallas	Forester Stadium	10,000
San Antonio	Jerry Comalander Stadium	10,000
Harlingen	J. Lewis Boggus Stadium	10,000
Brownsville	Sams Memorial Stadium	10,000
Corsicana	Tiger Stadium	10,000
New Braunfels	Unicorn Stadium	10,000
Waller	Waller ISD Stadium	10,000
