= Stallworth =

Stallworth may refer to:

- Alma G. Stallworth (1932–2020), American politician
- Charlie Stallworth (born 1964), Connecticut state legislator
- Dave Stallworth (1941–2017), American professional basketball player
- Donté Stallworth (born 1980), American football wide receiver
- Isaac Stallworth (born 1950), retired American basketball player
- James Adams Stallworth (1822–1861), U.S. Representative from Alabama
- Joel Stallworth (born 1984), American sprinter
- John Stallworth (born 1952), retired wide receiver who played for the Pittsburgh Steelers
- Omarosa Manigault-Stallworth (born 1974), reality show participant
- Ron Stallworth (born 1953), retired police officer who infiltrated the ranks of the KKK
- Ron Stallworth (born 1966), American professional football player
- Taylor Stallworth (born 1995), American football player
- Tim Stallworth (born 1966), American football player

== See also ==
- Stallworth Stadium, stadium in Baytown, Texas
