= Robert E. Lee High School (Baytown, Texas) =

Public school in Texas, United States

Location
- 1809 Market Street; Baytown, Texas 77520-6543; United States; 29°43′52″N 94°59′11″W

Information
- Type: Public
- Motto: Once a Gander, Always a Gander
- Established: 1928; 98 years ago
- School district: Goose Creek Consolidated Independent School District
- Principal: Earnest Brooks
- Staff: 122.77(FTE)
- Grades: 9-12
- Student to teacher ratio: 14.68
- Colors: Maroon, white and gray
- Athletics conference: UIL Class 5A
- Mascot: Gander
- Accreditation: Texas Education Agency
- Website: Lee High School

Robert E. Lee High School is a public high school in Baytown, Texas, that serves grades 9 through 12. It was opened as a segregated school, and named after Confederate Army commander Robert E. Lee. Lee is one of four high schools in the Goose Creek Consolidated Independent School District. The building is a Texas historic landmark. For the 2024-2025 school year, the school received an overall rating of "B" from the Texas Education Agency.

== History ==
Robert E. Lee High School was established in 1928, during the Jim Crow-era, and named in honor of Robert E. Lee, the military commander of the Confedererate Army. It opened as a segregated school for white students; Mexican students were not allowed until later while Black students were not allowed to attend until the Fall of 1967. Prior to this, Black students attended Goose Creek School for Coloreds, which was later renamed George Washington Carver High School. Mexican students attended Goose Creek Mexican School. As of 1923 the White students were housed in three brick buildings replete with laboratories and offices, while the Mexican school was a one room frame building, and the Black school was a two room frame building.

In 1940, the school's band adopted uniforms meant to be authentic representations of the uniforms worn by the Confederate Army. The community raised and donated money to repay the district for the cost of the new uniforms. In 1952, the school band performed for the Sons of Confederate Veterans, a neo-Confederate organization, at their national convention in Jackson, Mississippi.

In 1970, several Black American parents requested that Goose Creek CISD board rename the school but the request was rejected.

On April 29, 1987, a three-alarm fire destroyed the interior of the main building, forcing students to finish the school year at rival Sterling High School. Initially thought to be accidental, it was eventually found to be arson. The main building interior was rebuilt and formally rededicated in 1988. The incident is mentioned in the Mean Gene Kelton song "Cruisin' Texas Avenue".

In September 2020 residents asked the Goose Creek CISD board to rename the school, but the board voted not to change the school's name, four members voting against and three voting for. The petitioners included the grandson of one of the individuals who asked for the renaming in 1970. The board instead created a committee to study whether a renaming should be done.

In March 2021 the Facility Names Committee chairperson issued a recommendation that the board keep the school's name. By that month only three schools in Texas were still named after Robert E. Lee, Baytown Lee among them. Shelby Webb of the Houston Chronicle wrote that students were relatively apathetic about the name while "Adults in the community have been more passionate on the issue."

== State Historical Site ==
In February 2011, at the request of the Baytown Historical Preservation Association, the school was designated by the state as a historical site. The Historical Preservation Association believed that Lee was eligible for the designation because of its age, unique architectural facade, and its importance to the Baytown community, and deserved to be recognized. A dedication ceremony took place on April 27, 2013.

== Academics ==
Alongside the typical core courses offered at all high schools, Lee also offers some advanced courses in various fields. The school offers Advanced Placement courses for Calculus AB, Calculus BC, Statistics, Physics, Art History, World History, U.S. History, European History, English Language, English Literature, American Government, Computer Science A, and Computer Science AB. In 2007, the school produced twenty five AP Scholars, and twenty nine in 2006.

== Athletics ==
Lee also participates in the UIL competitions in class 5A, Region III. Lee won the Texas state championship in baseball in 1955 (class 2A).

== Demographics ==
The school has had a significant demographic shift as with many public schools in the Houston area. The school went from a non-Hispanic white-majority to a Hispanic-majority in the 2000s. As of 2019, the school's ethnic breakdown is 10 percent non-Hispanic White, 73 percent Hispanic, 15 percent African-American, and 2 percent other. As of 2020, the school had an enrollment of 1,784, of whom 1,275 identified as Hispanic, 253 as Black, 215 as White, 12 as Asian, 6 as American Indian/Alaska Native and 21 as two or more races. 952 were male, 832 were female.

== Notable alumni ==
- Jermaine Alfred, Baylor University 95-00 and Arena Football League Quarterback, Owner/Operator Texas Quarterback Club
- Kirk Botkin, former NFL player and collegiate football coach
- Brian Brock, theologian
- Russell Brock, LSU beach volleyball coach
- William Broyles Jr., screenwriter
- James Cleveland, former Houston Cougars wide receiver
- Norman Cooling, Brigadier General in the United States Marines
- Quentin Coryatt, former Texas A&M and Indianapolis Colts linebacker
- Reggie Craig, NFL wide receiver 1975-1977, University of Arkansas
- Charles Godfrey, former safety for Carolina Panthers
- Jimmy Herndon, offensive Lineman for University of Houston, Jacksonville Jaguars, Chicago Bears and Houston Texans
- Brian Johnson, American football coach and former quarterback, current assistant Head Coach for the Washington Commanders
- Ell Roberson III, former Kansas State University quarterback
- Clayton Shields, professional basketball player and coach
- Clint Stoerner, former quarterback for University of Arkansas, Dallas Cowboys, and Miami Dolphins
- Tom Stolhandske, NFL and CFL player
- Drew Tate, University of Iowa and CFL quarterback
- Robert Thompson, (1933-1984), dancer and choreographer. Starred in the 1961 movie version of West Side Story.
