= Coady, Texas =

Unincorporated community in Texas, US

Coordinates: 29°47′04″N 95°00′59″W

Coady is an unincorporated community in east central Harris County, Texas, United States.

== Education ==
Goose Creek Independent School District operates schools in the area.
