= Brett Marshall =

American baseball player (born 1990)

- Pitcher
- Born: March 22, 1990 (age 35); Highlands, Texas, U.S.
- Batted: Right Threw: Right

MLB debut
- May 15, 2013, for the New York Yankees

Last MLB appearance
- September 29, 2013, for the New York Yankees

MLB statistics
- Win–loss record: 0–0
- Earned run average: 4.50
- Strikeouts: 7
- Stats at Baseball Reference

Teams
- New York Yankees (2013)

Brett Edward Marshall (born March 22, 1990) is an American former professional baseball pitcher. He played in Major League Baseball (MLB) for the New York Yankees.

== Career ==
Marshall attended Sterling High School in Baytown, Texas, where he played for the school's baseball team. In 2008, Marshall was named to the All-State first team.

=== New York Yankees ===
Marshall was drafted by the New York Yankees in the sixth round, with the 200th overall selection, of the 2008 Major League Baseball draft. He signed with the Yankees, receiving a $850,000 signing bonus. Marshall made his professional debut with the rookie-level Gulf Coast League Yankees.

Marshall spent the 2009 season with the Single-A Charleston RiverDogs, posting a 3–6 record and 5.56 ERA with 60 strikeouts across 17 starts. He split the 2010 campaign between the GCL Yankees, Charleston, and the High-A Tampa Yankees. In 16 appearances (15 starts) for the three affiliates, Marshall accumulated a 4–2 record and 2.57 ERA with 70 strikeouts over 84 innings of work.

In 2011, Marshall made 27 appearances (26 starts) for Tampa, compiling a 9–7 record and 3.78 ERA with 114 strikeouts across 140 1/3 innings pitched. He spent the 2012 season with the Double-A Trenton Thunder, posting a 13–7 record and 3.52 ERA with 120 strikeouts in 158 1/3 innings pitched across 27 starts. Marshall began the 2013 season with the Triple-A Scranton/Wilkes-Barre RailRiders.

Marshall made his Major League debut on May 15, 2013, against the Seattle Mariners. During his debut, he threw 108 pitches in relief, giving up five runs (all earned) including two home runs in 5 2/3 innings during a 12–2 blowout loss to the Seattle Mariners. He was optioned back to Triple-A Scranton/Wilkes-Barre on May 16. Marshall was brought back up to the Yankees on September 1, when rosters expanded. He made three appearances for New York during his rookie campaign, recording a 4.50 ERA with seven strikeouts over 12 innings of work. On December 19, Marshall was designated for assignment by the Yankees following the signing of Carlos Beltrán.

=== Cincinnati Reds ===
Marshall was claimed off waivers by the Chicago Cubs on December 23, 2013. He was later removed from the Cubs roster and claimed by the Cincinnati Reds on February 12, 2014. He was designated for assignment on July 10, 2014.

=== Colorado Rockies ===
On November 22, 2014, Marshall signed a minor league contract with the Colorado Rockies organization. In 7 starts for the Double–A New Britain Rock Cats, he compiled a 1–4 record and 5.40 ERA with 31 strikeouts over 41 2/3 innings pitched. Marshall was released by Colorado on July 12, 2015.

=== Sugar Land Skeeters ===
Marshall signed with the Sugar Land Skeeters of the Atlantic League of Professional Baseball for the 2015 season. He became a free agent after the 2015 season.

=== Tampa Bay Rays ===
On February 22, 2016, Marshall signed a minor league contract with the Tampa Bay Rays. In 15 appearances for the Double-A Montgomery Biscuits, he struggled to an 8.24 ERA with 13 strikeouts across 19 2/3 innings pitched. Marshall was released by the Rays organization on May 31.

=== Sugar Land Skeeters (second stint) ===
On June 23, 2016, Marshall signed with the Sugar Land Skeeters of the Atlantic League of Professional Baseball. He re-signed with the club in early 2018. He was released on June 14, 2018.

=== Southern Maryland Blue Crabs ===
On June 20, 2018, Marshall signed with the Southern Maryland Blue Crabs of the Atlantic League of Professional Baseball.

=== Long Island Ducks ===
On August 31, 2018, Marshall was traded to the Long Island Ducks of the Atlantic League of Professional Baseball. He was released on May 27, 2019.
