= Kirk Botkin =

American football player and coach (born 1971)

Murray State Racers
- Title: Defensive coordinator

Personal information
- Born: March 19, 1971 (age 55); Baytown, Texas, U.S.
- Listed height: 6 ft 3 in (1.91 m)
- Listed weight: 245 lb (111 kg)

Career information
- High school: Robert E. Lee (Baytown, Texas)
- College: Arkansas
- NFL draft: 1994: undrafted

Career history

Playing
- New England Patriots (1994)*; New Orleans Saints (1994–1995); Pittsburgh Steelers (1996–1997)
- * Offseason or practice squad member only

Coaching
- Jacksonville State (2001–2005) Assistant coach; Louisiana-Monroe (2006–2007) Linebackers coach/special teams coordinator; Arkansas (2008–2009) Defensive ends coach/special teams coordinator; Texas High School (2010–2011); South Carolina (2012–2015) Linebackers/spurs coach; South Carolina State (2016) Defensive coordinator; Dekaney High School (2017–2019) Defensive coordinator; Magnolia West High School (2020–2024) Defensive coordinator; Murray State (2025–present) Defensive coordinator

Awards and highlights
- First-team All-SEC (1992); Second-team All-SEC (1993)

Career NFL statistics
- Games played: 48
- Games started: 1
- Receptions / Yds: 6 / 55
- Stats at Pro Football Reference

Kirk Randal Botkin (born March 19, 1971) is an American football coach and former player. He is the defensive coordinator at Murray State University. Botkin played professional as a tight end and long snapper for four seasons in the National Football League (NFL) with the New Orleans Saints and the Pittsburgh Steelers.

== Early life ==
Botkin was born in Baytown, Texas, where he attended Robert E. Lee High School.

== College football ==
Botkin played college football at the University of Arkansas from 1990 to 1993. In 1992, he was selected to the 1st team All-SEC football team as named by the conference's coaches. He was the first Razorback to earn that honor. He was named to the 2nd team by the AP in 1992. In 1993, Botkin was named 2nd team all conference by the AP and the Coaches. He went through four different head coaches during his time in Fayetteville. Ken Hatfield recruited him; Jack Crowe coached him from 1990 to the first game of the 1992 season; Joe Kines coached the team for the remainder of the 1992 season after Crowe was fired; and finally Danny Ford became the head coach in 1993. Botkin played in one bowl game during his time with Arkansas; a loss in the 1991 Independence Bowl.

== Pro football career ==
Botkin went undrafted in the 1994 NFL draft, but was signed by the New England Patriots just afterward. He was released by the Patriots during training camp in August 1994. He was picked up by the New Orleans Saints once the 1994 season was underway. He remained with the Saints though the 1995 season.

Botkin was waived by the Saints prior to the 1996 season, but was claimed off waivers by the Pittsburgh Steelers. He was used by the Steelers over the next two seasons primarily as a long snapper, but also saw some work at tight end due to an injury to the team's starting tight end, Mark Bruener.

Botkin did not return for 1998 after the Steelers rescinded a contract offer to him.

== Coaching career ==
Botkin was the linebackers coach for the South Carolina Gamecocks from 2012-2016. Previously, Botkin was hired as a football coach at Jacksonville State University by head coach Jack Crowe under whom Botkin had played at Arkansas. He moved on to become the linebackers coach and special teams coordinator at the University of Louisiana at Monroe in 2006.

Botkin returned to his alma mater, Arkansas, in 2008 as the defensive ends coach and special teams coordinator under head coach Bobby Petrino. He was relieved of his special teams responsibilities in 2009, but remained as a defensive coach. He left Arkansas in January 2010. Then took a job at Texas High School in Texarkana, Texas (along with 2 other ex-NFL players: Earnest Rhone and Cody Spencer. On January 13, 2012, Botkin was named linebackers coach for the South Carolina Gamecocks. Botkin was relieved of his duties as linebackers coach at South Carolina after the retirement of Steve Spurrier. Botkin was then hired by the South Carolina State University Bulldogs in Orangeburg, SC as the defensive coordinator in February 2016.
