= Reggie Craig =

American football player (born 1953)

No. 80, 86
- Position: Wide receiver

Personal information
- Born: June 10, 1953 (age 73); Baytown, Texas, U.S.
- Listed height: 6 ft 1 in (1.85 m)
- Listed weight: 187 lb (85 kg)

Career information
- High school: Robert E. Lee
- College: Arkansas
- NFL draft: 1975: undrafted

Career history
- Kansas City Chiefs (1975–1976); Cleveland Browns (1977); Buffalo Bills (1977); Green Bay Packers (1978)*
- * Offseason or practice squad member only
- Stats at Pro Football Reference

Reggie Craig (born June 10, 1953) is an American former professional football player who played wide receiver for four seasons for the Kansas City Chiefs, Cleveland Browns, and Buffalo Bills.
