= Robert Thompson (dancer) =

American dancer and choreographer (1933–1984)

- Born: Robert Lee Thompson; October 9, 1933; Louisiana, United States
- Died: June 13, 1984 (aged 50); California, United States
- Occupations: Dancer and choreographer

Robert Lee Thompson (sometimes credited as Bob Thompson; October 9, 1933 – June 13, 1984) was an American dancer and choreographer known for his work in both stage and film productions, particularly in ballet. A member of Jerome Robbins troupe, "Ballets USA", he is known for his association with West Side Story, in which he performed in the 1961 film adaptation and stage revivals, as well as his later contributions as choreographer to projects such as the film Xanadu.

== Early life ==
Thompson was born on October 9, 1933, in Breaux Bridge, Louisiana the oldest of three sons of Robert Lee Thompson, Sr. and Thelma Marie née Devillier. His mother was from a long-established French Louisiana family. His father had worked in the Research and Development department for Exxon.

Thompson's family moved to Baytown, Texas, when he was a teenager. At age sixteen, he enrolled in dance classes. While still at high school, he was employed at the Fred Astaire Dance Studios and was featured in a floor show at the Shamrock Hotel. He soon began to take advanced ballet and tap classes in Houston, Texas, and after graduating from Robert E. Lee High School, he received a scholarship from the Houston Youth Ballet Foundation and danced several shows in Houston, his first being in The Golden Apple at Theatre Inc. in Houston.

== Career ==
In the mid-1950s, Thompson moved to California and appeared in Rhonda Fleming's act, dancing with her on the nightclub circuit in Las Vegas, Nevada. He then did freelance dancing with Cyd Charisse and in engagements in Las Vegas and Miami, Florida, with Ann-Margret. He appeared in a Los Angeles production of Annie Get Your Gun with Mary Martin and made his first appeared on television when the show was filmed as a TV as a special in 1957.

In 1960 Thompson performed in the film Can Can. In the 1961 film West Side Story, he played Luis, one of the Sharks. He then joined Jerome Robbins’ Ballets U.S.A., with whom he performed in The Concert, New York Export: Opus Jazz, and Moves, and starred in Interplay. From 1963, he toured Europe for two years with Robbins' group, performing in Anonymous Figure with Music by Teiji Ito in the Festival dei Due Mondi at the Teatrino delle Sette in Spoleto, Italy.

Thompson next appeared in dance roles in movies such as Thoroughly Modern Millie and Doctor Dolittle in 1967, a series of films starring Barbra Streisand: Funny Girl in 1968, Hello, Dolly! (1969) and Up the Sandbox (1972). Meanwhile, he appeared in more shows with Danny Kaye and Dean Martin, and began to work as a choreographer, starting as assistant choreographer, including a show with Mama Cass in Las Vegas, and two years at the Hollywood Palace from 1969 to 1970.

By 1974, he had moved to San Francisco where he was a partner in a Victorian Home Decoration and landscaping business. However, he also continued to occasionally choreograph into the early 1980s, including for the film Xanadu and TV shows such as Happy Days and Hart to Hart.

== Personal life ==
Thompson married Joan Patricia Daugherty in July 1953. In November of that year, their daughter Kristy Lin was born, and in February 1955 they had a son, Chadley Blake (known as Chad). In 1969, Thompson became interested in photography, creating a record of the lavish and colorful costumes on the set of Hello Dolly.

Thompson died on June 13, 1984, in Los Angeles.

== Productions ==
=== Theatre ===
- The Music Man, national road company
- Annie Get Your Gun, revival with Mary Martin

=== Dance ===
- "Ballets USA", 1958, Thompson was part of the ensemble as a dancer. The show featured a collection of ballet pieces choreographed by Jerome Robbins including:
  - Moves
  - Interplay
  - N.Y. Export: Opus Jazz

=== Film ===
- Can Can (1960 film)
- West Side Story (1961 film) - Luis, member of the Sharks
- When the Boys Meet the Girls (1965) – Dancer (uncredited)
- Thoroughly Modern Millie (1967)
- Doctor Dolittle (1967)
- The Happiest Millionaire (1967) – Dancer, Barfly (uncredited)
- Funny Girl (1968)
- Sweet Charity (1969)
- Hello, Dolly! (1969)
- Up the Sandbox (1972)

=== Television ===
- The Red Skelton Show
- The Phyllis Diller Show
- The Dean Martin Show (for two years)
- The Hollywood Palace (1968)

=== Choreography ===
==== Film ====
- Of Thee I Sing (TV Movie, 1972) – Assistant Choreographer
- Xanadu (1980) – Assistant Choreographer
- Jinxed! (1982) – Choreographer

==== Television ====
- The Dinah Shore Special: Like Hep (TV Special, 1969) – Assistant Choreographer
- The Hollywood Palace (TV Series, 1969–1970) – Assistant Choreographer (14 episodes)
- The ABC Comedy Hour (TV Series, 1972) – Assistant Choreographer (1 episode)
- Cher (TV Series, 1975) – Associate Choreographer (1 episode)
- John Denver and Friend (TV Special, 1976) – Assistant Choreographer
- The Captain & Tennille Special (TV Special, 1976) – Choreographer
- The Captain and Tennille (TV Series, 1976) – Choreographer (1 episode)
- The Carpenters at Christmas (TV Special, 1977) – Choreographer
- The Carpenters...Space Encounters (TV Special, 1978) – Choreographer
- Laverne & Shirley (TV Series, 1979) – Choreographer (1 episode)
- The Carpenters: Music, Music, Music (TV Special, 1980) – Choreographer
- The Osmond Family Christmas Special (1980) – Assistant Choreographer
- Happy Days (TV Series, 1979–1981) – Choreographer (2 episodes)
- Hart to Hart (TV Series, 1982) – Choreographer (1 episode)
