= Brian Brock =

American theologian and ethicist (born 1970)

Professor Brian Brock
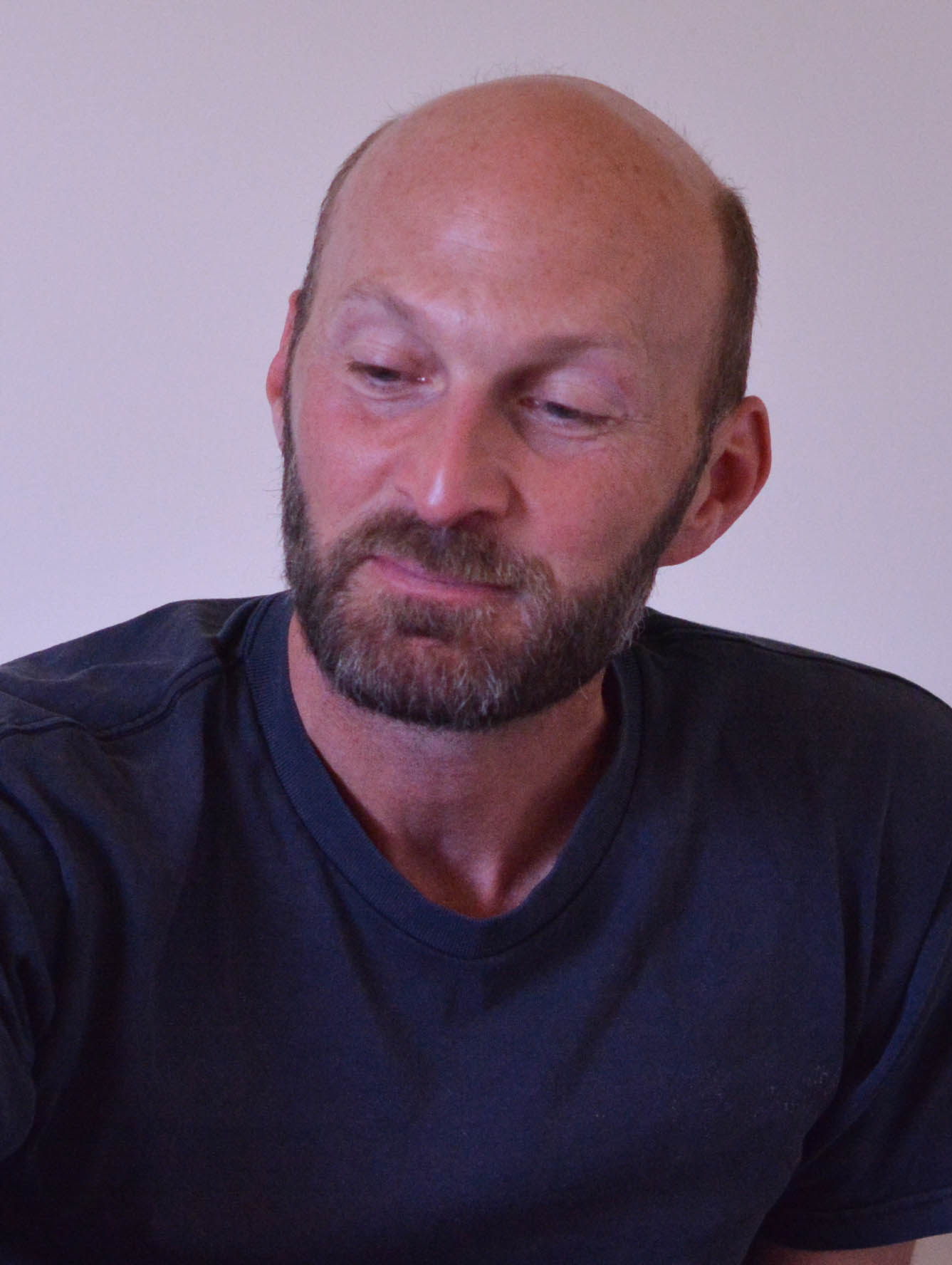
- Born: Brian Reid Brock; Baytown, Texas, US
- Occupations: Professor, Theologian
- Title: Professor of Moral and Practical Theology

Academic background
- Education: MA, DipTH, BA, DPhil
- Alma mater: Colorado Christian University; Loma Linda University; University of Oxford; King's College London

Academic work
- Discipline: Theology
- Institutions: University of Erlangen–Nuremberg; Duke Divinity School; Theological University of the Reformed Churches; University of Aberdeen
- Main interests: Disability Theology, Systematic Theology, and Theological Ethics

Brian Brock (born 1970) is an American theologian. He holds a Personal Chair in Christian Ethics at the School of Divinity, History, and Philosophy, University of Aberdeen.

== Early life and education ==
Brock was born and raised in Baytown, Texas, where he was educated at Robert E. Lee High School. Before training as a theologian, he worked as an investigative reporter and editorialist from 1997 to 1999 for the Baytown Sun.

Brock studied biology at Colorado Christian University before taking a master's in biomedical and clinical ethics at Loma Linda University. In 1997, he moved to the United Kingdom, where he studied theology at the University of Oxford, before completing his doctoral studies in Christian Ethics in 2003 at King's College London, working under Michael Banner and Colin Gunton.

== Academic career ==
Brock conducted postdoctoral studies (2003-2004) at the Friedrich Alexander University of Erlangen–Nuremberg under Hans G. Ulrich. In October 2004, he was appointed as a lecturer in Practical and Moral Theology at the University of Aberdeen. He was elevated to a Personal Chair in 2018. He has been a visiting scholar at Duke Divinity School (2008-2009) and the University of the Reformed Church in Kampen in 2014.

Brock is a member of the University of Aberdeen's Centre for Spirituality, Health and Disability and a founding member of the Centre for the Study of Autism and Christian Community Friendship. He is also a founding member of the new University of Aberdeen Friendship House initiative.

Brock plays an active role in teaching undergraduates at the University of Aberdeen, leading postgraduate seminars, and has successfully supervised thirty doctoral candidates, many of whom have published their doctoral theses as books, including Andrew Draper, Scott Prather, Tyler Atkinson, Michael Laffin, Benjamin Wall, Amy J. Erickson, Andrew Errington, Steven Schafer, Kevin Hargaden, Jacob Marques Rollison, Timothy Shaun Price, Daniel Patterson, Ross Halbach, Allen Calhoun, Michael Morelli, and Emily Beth Hill. In 2022, the Aberdeen University Students' Association (AUSA) named him Best Postgraduate Research Supervisor.

== Professional activities ==
Since 2016, Brock has been Editor-in-Chief of the Journal of Disability and Religion. Along with Susan Parsons, he is the founding editor of the academic monograph series, "T&T Clark Enquiries in Theological Ethics". Since 2012 he has served on the Theological Commission of the Diocese of Aberdeen and Orkney, Scottish Episcopal Church.

He is most notable for his contribution to the emerging field of disability theology, but has written widely in moral theology. In 2018, he was awarded "Alumnus of the Year" by Loma Linda University, being described as "a maker of social change who betters understanding of the Christian tradition." He is regularly invited to offer plenary addresses at conferences relating to questions around disability and religion, or Christian Ethics more broadly construed. He delivered the 2024 Annual Jesuit Centre for Faith and Justice lecture in Dublin, Ireland.

== Publications ==
Brock's first monograph, Singing the Ethos of God: On the Place of Christian Ethics in Scripture was published in 2007. It was the subject of a special review edition of the journal European Journal of Theology in 2009. He is also the author of Christian Ethics in a Technological Age (2010) and Captive to Christ, Open to the World: On Doing Christian Ethics in Public (2014), which was discussed on the prominent evangelical podcast Mars Hill. Along with Stanley Hauerwas, he wrote Beginnings: Interrogating Hauerwas(2016), which was the subject of a special symposium hosted by the School of Theology, Philosophy, and Music at Dublin City University. His Disability in the Christian Tradition: A Reader, which he prepared with John Swinton was the subject of a special edition of the Journal of Religion, Disability & Health. The project he has been working on for over a decade, a theological account of disability, was published in 2019 as Wondrously Wounded: Theology, Disability, and the Body of Christ.

Other books include Disability: Living into the Diversity of Christ's Body (2021) and the two-volume Scriptural commentary on 1 Corinthians, co-written with Bernd Wannenwetsch entitled The Malady of the Christian Body and The Therapy of the Christian Body. He has edited or co-edited a number of essay collections, including Theology, Disability and Sport: Social Justice Perspectives, A Graceful Embrace: Theological Reflections on Adopting Children, The Freedom of a Christian Ethicist, Evoking Lament: A Systematic Theological Enquiry and Theology, Disability and the New Genetics: Why Science Needs the Church. He also edited the first full-length English-language work by prominent German theologian Hans G. Ulrich, Transfigured Not Conformed: Christian Ethics in a Hermeneutic Key.

He is the author of over twenty essays in journals including the International Journal of Systematic Theology, Studies in Christian Ethics, and Surveillance & Society.
