= Bayou Bowl =

Annual high school football game in Texas

- Stadium: Eagle Stadium
- Location: Mont Belvieu, TX
- Type of game: High-school All-Star football game
- Played between: Houston & East Texas (2025–present)
- Previously played between: Texas & Louisiana (2003–2013); East & West Houston (2014–2024)
| Years Active | 2003–present |

The Bayou Bowl is an annual high school football all-star bowl game in which the best graduated seniors from Greater Houston and East Texas play against each other. It has been played at Eagle Stadium in Mont Belvieu, Texas, since 2025. It was formerly played in Stallworth Stadium in Baytown, Texas.

== Bowl history ==
The game was conceived as a join collaboration between leaders in the Baytown-Houston area, including the Baytown/West Chambers County, TX Economic Development Foundation, the President of the Baytown Chamber of Commerce, the incoming chair of the Greater Houston Football Coaches Association and a banker from Amegy Bank in Baytown.

After the initial success in 2003, leaders of the Bayou Bowl decided to donate proceeds to the Shriner's Hospitals for Children in Galveston and Houston. In 2007, the Bayou Bowl raised $33,000 for the Shriner's Hospitals. Most of the money was raised by the Bayou Bowl Celebrity Golf Tournament. After the 2013 game, both the Louisiana High School Athletic Association and the Greater Houston Football Coaches Association (GHFCA) mutually agreed to end the series and the format shifted to an East vs. West game in which the city was divided along Interstate 45. In 2025 the format was again changed to pit the graduating players from the GHFCA's member schools and the East Texas Coaches Association (ETCA)'s member schools.

Since 2025 the Bayou Bowl has also included an "HBCU-style battle of the bands" named the Battle on the Bayou, involving four HISD bands. The event takes place before the football game.

== Bayou Bowl Celebrity Golf Tournament ==
Associated with the Bayou Bowl is the Bayou Bowl Celebrity Golf Tournament, which provides a major portion of the fundraising given to the Shriner's Hospitals. Past celebrities include:

- Jim Bierne - Former Houston Oilers wide receiver
- Butch Alsandor - KHOU sportscaster
- Booker T - WWE wrestler
- Ed Biles - Former head coach of the Houston Oilers
- Roger Hinshaw - Defensive Coordinator at Lamar University
- Calvin Murphy - Pro Basketball Hall of Fame with Houston Rockets
- Paul Gaffney - Of the Harlem Globetrotters

== Game results ==
| Year | Winning team | | Losing team | |
|---|---|---|---|---|
Texas vs. Louisiana
| 2003 | Texas | 32 | Louisiana | 29 |
| 2004 | Texas | 17 | Louisiana | 15 |
| 2005 | Louisiana | 10 | Texas | 7 |
| 2006 | Louisiana | 7 | Texas | 3 |
| 2007 | Louisiana | 31 | Texas | 15 |
| 2008 | Texas | 24 | Louisiana | 14 |
| 2009 | Texas | 17 | Louisiana | 14 |
| 2010 | Texas | 42 | Louisiana | 15 |
| 2011 | Louisiana | 30 | Texas | 23 |
| 2012 | Louisiana | 23 | Texas | 23 |
| 2013 | Texas | 22 | Louisiana | 14 |
East vs. West
| 2014 | East | 7 | West | 0 |
| 2015 | East | 27 | West | 9 |
| 2016 | East | 14 | West | 9 |
| 2017 | East | 30 | West | 7 |
| 2018 | West | 37 | East | 36 |
| 2019 | East | 31 | West | 21 |
| 2020 | Cancelled due to COVID-19. | | | |
| 2021 | East | 13 | West | 11 |
| 2022 | East | 24 | West | 20 |
| 2023 | East | 18 | West | 0 |
| 2024 | East | 63 | West | 21 |
Houston vs. East Texas
| 2025 | Houston | 23 | East Texas | 7 |

== See also ==
- Stallworth Stadium
- Baytown, Texas
- Mont Belvieu, Texas
