= Goose Creek Memorial High School =

Location
- 6001 East Wallisville Road; Baytown, Texas 77521; United States

Information
- School type: Public high school
- Motto: One School, One Dream, One Team!
- Established: 2008
- School district: Goose Creek Consolidated Independent School District
- Principal: Kelley Start
- Teaching staff: 145.50 (FTE)
- Grades: 9-12
- Enrollment: 2,328 (2023-2024)
- Student to teacher ratio: 16.00
- Colors: Red, black, and silver
- Athletics conference: UIL Class 6A
- Mascot: Patriot
- Website: Goose Creek Memorial High School

Goose Creek Memorial High School is a public high school in an unincorporated area of Harris County, Texas, United States, and is located north of Baytown. Goose Creek Memorial is one of the three public high schools in the Goose Creek Consolidated Independent School District and was built to accommodate the growing population of northern Goose Creek CISD. It was opened with grades 9 to 11 for the 2008–2009 school year, adding students in grade 12 the following year. In 2011, the school was rated "Academically Acceptable" by the Texas Education Agency.

Goose Creek Memorial High School is home to the Global Business Academy and it is an AVID National Demonstration School. GCM offers opportunities for students to be college and career ready, including Dual Credit, welding, commercial photography, and more.

== History ==
The school was built as part of the district's 2005 bond, worth a total of $220.5 million. The school was to open with grades 9, 10, and 11; its first graduation would occur in 2010. The school initially had 1,200 students and 82 teachers. The dedication ceremony was scheduled for February 2, 2009.

The Goose Creek CISD board took 33 names suggested by area residents and engaged four rounds of voting. The most popular choices were Goose Creek Memorial, Sam Houston, and Juan Seguin, and the board selected Memorial. The CCISD approved the school's name on August 27, 2007.

In 2024, Goose Creek Memorial High School was recognized as an "Apple Distinguished School", making it one of only 7 high school in the Houston Area to have such recognition.

== Neighborhoods served by Goose Creek Memorial ==
The school's attendance boundary includes unincorporated areas, including Meadowlake Village, Springfield, Craigmont, Eastpoint, McNair, and Highlands.

== Mascot and colors ==
A selection of students and parents in the anticipated attendance zone for Goose Creek Memorial were in charge of selecting the choice of the school mascot and colors. They selected the school mascot and the colors red, black, and silver.

== Athletics ==
Goose Creek, upon opening, joined the University Interscholastic League (UIL) 4A school group. School officials projected it would be upgraded to rank 5A after population growth occurred. By July 1, 2008, the school hired its head coaches. In 2024, Goose Creek was upgraded to Rank 6A University Interscholastic League (UIL) after a recent population "boom" in the Baytown-Highlands Area.

The Goose Creek Memorial Patriots compete in the following sports:

Cross Country, Volleyball, Football, Basketball, Soccer, Golf, Tennis, Track, Softball & Baseball
