= Sterling High School (Baytown, Texas) =

Public high school in Baytown, Texas, United States

Ross S. Sterling High School

Location
- 300 West Baker Road, Baytown, TX 77521; Baytown, Harris County, Texas 77521-2301; United States; 29.77125°N 94.9695°W

Information
- Other name: Baytown Sterling
- School type: Public high school
- Motto: Success for all students
- Established: 1966
- School district: Goose Creek Independent School District
- Principal: Nathan Chaddick
- Teaching staff: 140.92 (FTE)
- Grades: 9-12
- Enrollment: 2,130 (2023–2024)
- Student to teacher ratio: 15.11
- Colors: Royal blue, silver, and white
- Athletics: Yes
- Athletics conference: UIL Class 6A
- Sports: Yes
- Mascot: Ranger
- Yearbook: The Governor
- Website: rss.gccisd.net

Ross S. Sterling High School is a public high school located in Baytown, Texas and classified as a 5A school by the UIL. Sterling is a part of the Goose Creek Consolidated Independent School District which covers southeastern Harris County and eastern Chambers County. The school was built in 1966 to accommodate the growing population of Baytown. It is named after Ross S. Sterling, co-founder of Humble Oil (now part of ExxonMobil) and 31st governor of Texas. The campus has over 400,000 square feet (37,000 m^{2}) and is built on 86.32 acres (349,300 m^{2}).

In 2015, the school was rated "Met Standard" by the Texas Education Agency.

Sections of the city of Baytown are zoned to Sterling High School. Previously, sections of Highlands were until the Goose Creek Memorial High School was built in 2008.

== Demographics ==
The 2014 School Membership Report shows that Sterling's ethnic breakdown includes:

- 1,237 (51%) Hispanic students
- 679 (28%) White students
- 412 (17%) African-American students
- 97 (4%) Asian-American, Indian, and other students

== Feeder patterns ==
Elementary schools that feed into Sterling include: Dr. Johnny T. Clark, Jr. Elementary, David Crockett Elementary, Harlem Elementary, Stephen F. Austin Elementary, James Bowie Elementary

The middle schools that feed into Sterling are: Cedar Bayou Junior, George H. Gentry Junior, Edward “EF” Green Junior

== Athletics ==
Ross S. Sterling High School competes in these sports;

Volleyball, Cross Country, Football, Basketball, Water Polo, Swimming, Soccer, Golf, Tennis, Track, Baseball, and Softball

Activities and clubs

Other activities available at Ross S. Sterling High School include:

- Art
- Band
- Colorguard
- Choir
- Orchestra
- Drama
- Sterling Stars Drill Team
- JV Sapphires Drill Team

Clubs available include:

- Student Council
- ALITE Club
- Anime Club
- National Art Honor Society
- National Technical Honor Society
- AVID Club
- Christian Student Union
- Fellowship of Christian Athletes
- Interact Club
- International Club
- Future Farmers of America
- Texas Association of Future Educators
- Key Club
- National Honor Society
- Environmental Club
- Strategy Club

Construction Club

== Academics ==
Sterling offers a wide range of courses. Along with the core courses, Sterling also offers many College Board AP courses, as well as Dual Credit. Sterling also offers students of Goose Creek CISD schools the opportunity to attend an academy at Sterling High School; the Health Science Academy and the Career Academy of Future Educators.

== Notable alumni ==
- Mark Alford, member of the U.S. House of Representatives
- Rocky Bernard, defensive tackle for the Seattle Seahawks who played in Super Bowl XL.
- Chris Cagle, Country music singer and songwriter
- Hunter Cervenka, Major League Baseball pitcher
- Jennifer Elrod, Federal Appellate Judge
- Romany Malco, Actor Weeds, The 40-Year-Old Virgin
- Brett Marshall, Major League Baseball pitcher
- Barry Smitherman, member of the Texas Railroad Commission
- Darren Walker, president of the Ford Foundation
