= David Adams (baseball) =

American baseball player (born 1987)

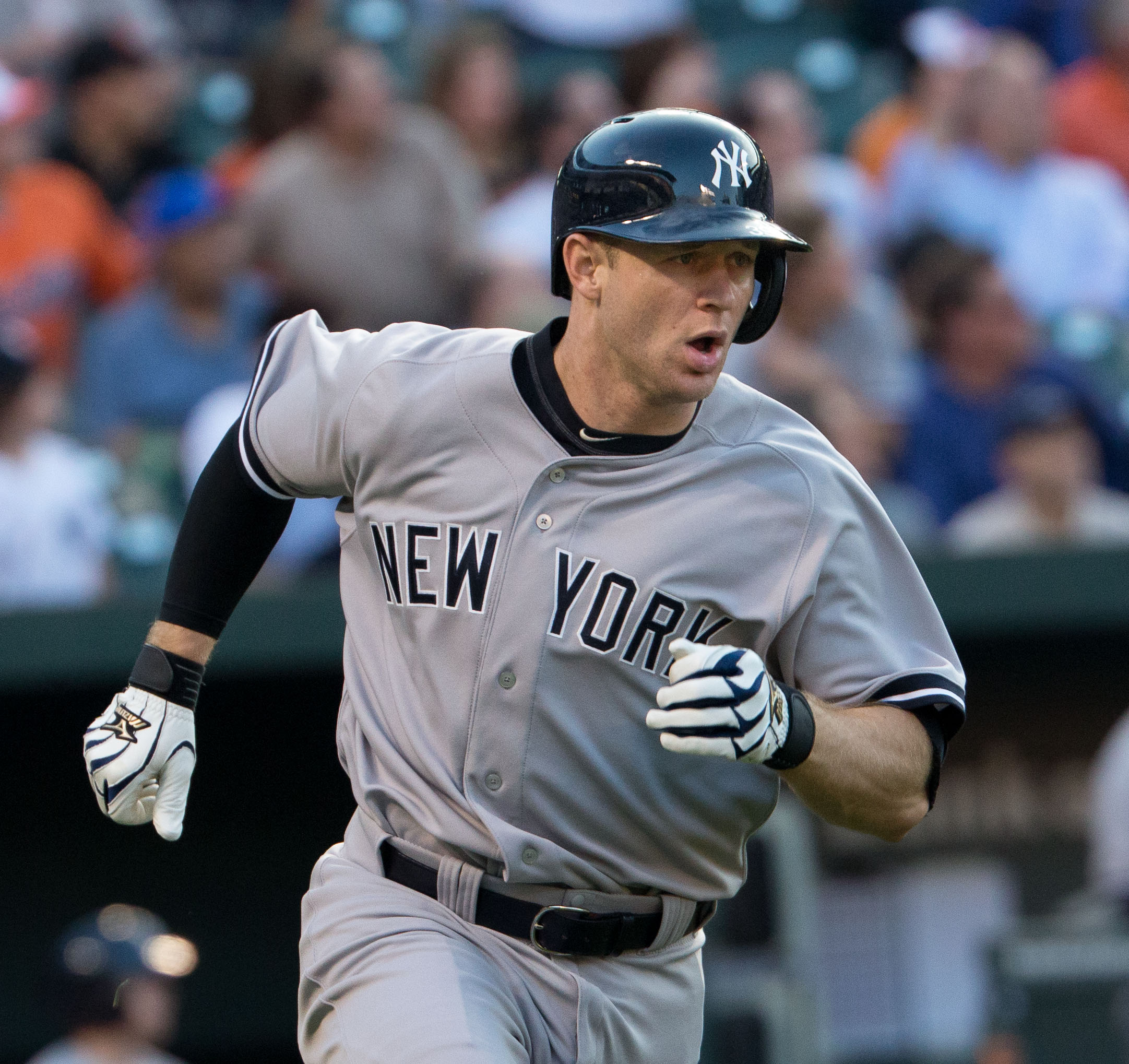
- Adams with the New York Yankees
- Second baseman / Third baseman
- Born: May 15, 1987 (age 39); Margate, Florida, U.S.
- Batted: Right Threw: Right

MLB debut
- May 15, 2013, for the New York Yankees

Last MLB appearance
- September 29, 2013, for the New York Yankees

MLB statistics
- Batting average: .193
- Home runs: 2
- Runs batted in: 13
- Stats at Baseball Reference

Teams
- New York Yankees (2013)

David Lee Adams (born May 15, 1987) is an American former professional baseball infielder. He played in Major League Baseball (MLB) for the New York Yankees in 2013.

Prior to playing professionally, Adams competed on travel teams and for Grandview Preparatory School in Boca Raton, Florida. He attended the University of Virginia, where he played college baseball for the Virginia Cavaliers.

== Amateur career ==
Adams played in amateur baseball tournaments from a young age, winning the championship in a 12-and-under travel competition for a team representing Broward and Palm Beach counties, against a team representing California's Central Valley, at the Baseball Hall of Fame in Cooperstown, New York. Chris Volstad was a teammate.

Adams attended Grandview Preparatory School in Boca Raton, Florida. A second baseman for the school's baseball team, Adams batted .464 with 25 runs batted in (RBI) and 17 stolen bases as a sophomore. He was named captain and MVP of the team. Major League Baseball scouts followed Grandview Prep to see Adams.

Adams committed to attend the University of Virginia, to play college baseball for the Virginia Cavaliers baseball team. Baseball America rated Adams as the second-best high school third baseman in the United States. The Detroit Tigers chose Adams in the 21st round of the 2005 Major League Baseball draft, but, disappointed with where he was selected, he opted not to sign, instead enrolling at Virginia.

In his freshman year, Adams became the Cavaliers' regular starting second baseman. He had a .318 batting average with five home runs and 49 runs batted in (RBI), and was named a Freshman All-American by Baseball America and Louisville Slugger. As a sophomore, in 2007, he had a .372 batting average and a .454 on-base percentage, earning Second-Team All-Atlantic Coast Conference honors. In 2006, he played collegiate summer baseball with the Brewster Whitecaps of the Cape Cod Baseball League, and returned to the league in 2007 to play for the Falmouth Commodores.

Adams played for the Cavaliers for three years, starting each season at second base. In his three years, Adams had a .325 batting average, and placed in the all-time top ten for the Cavaliers with 226 hits, 142 runs batted in, and 102 walks. The Cavaliers reached the NCAA Division I baseball tournament in all of Adams' three years at Virginia.

== Professional career ==
=== New York Yankees ===
Out of Virginia, the New York Yankees selected Adams in the third round (106th overall) of the 2008 Major League Baseball draft. Adams signed and made his professional debut that year with the Low–A Staten Island Yankees.

Adams played for the Single–A Charleston RiverDogs and High–A Tampa Yankees in 2009. He began the 2010 season with the Double–A Trenton Thunder, but suffered an ankle injury in May. The injury was originally thought to be a sprain and the organization had him try to rehab the injury for two months.

At the 2010 MLB trade deadline, the Yankees and Seattle Mariners almost completed a deal that would have sent Adams, Jesús Montero, and Zach McAllister to the Seattle Mariners in exchange for All-Star pitcher Cliff Lee. When the teams shared medical reports, the Mariners determined that Adams' ankle was broken, not sprained. As a result, they chose to trade Lee to the Texas Rangers in a package centered around Justin Smoak. Adams was shut down for the season after the discovery and only appeared in 39 games that year.

Still rehabilitating from his ankle injury, Adams played for Tampa and the Rookie-level Gulf Coast Yankees in 2011. He was put on the disabled list three times due to the ankle. Adams was added to the Yankees' 40-man roster after the 2011 season to protect him from the Rule 5 draft.

Adams spent the 2012 season with the Trenton Thunder of the Double–A Eastern League, where he hit .306/.385/.450 over 383 plate appearances. He played in only 86 games, as he missed time due to back spasms. After the regular season, the Yankees assigned Adams to play in the Arizona Fall League, where he played second and third base.

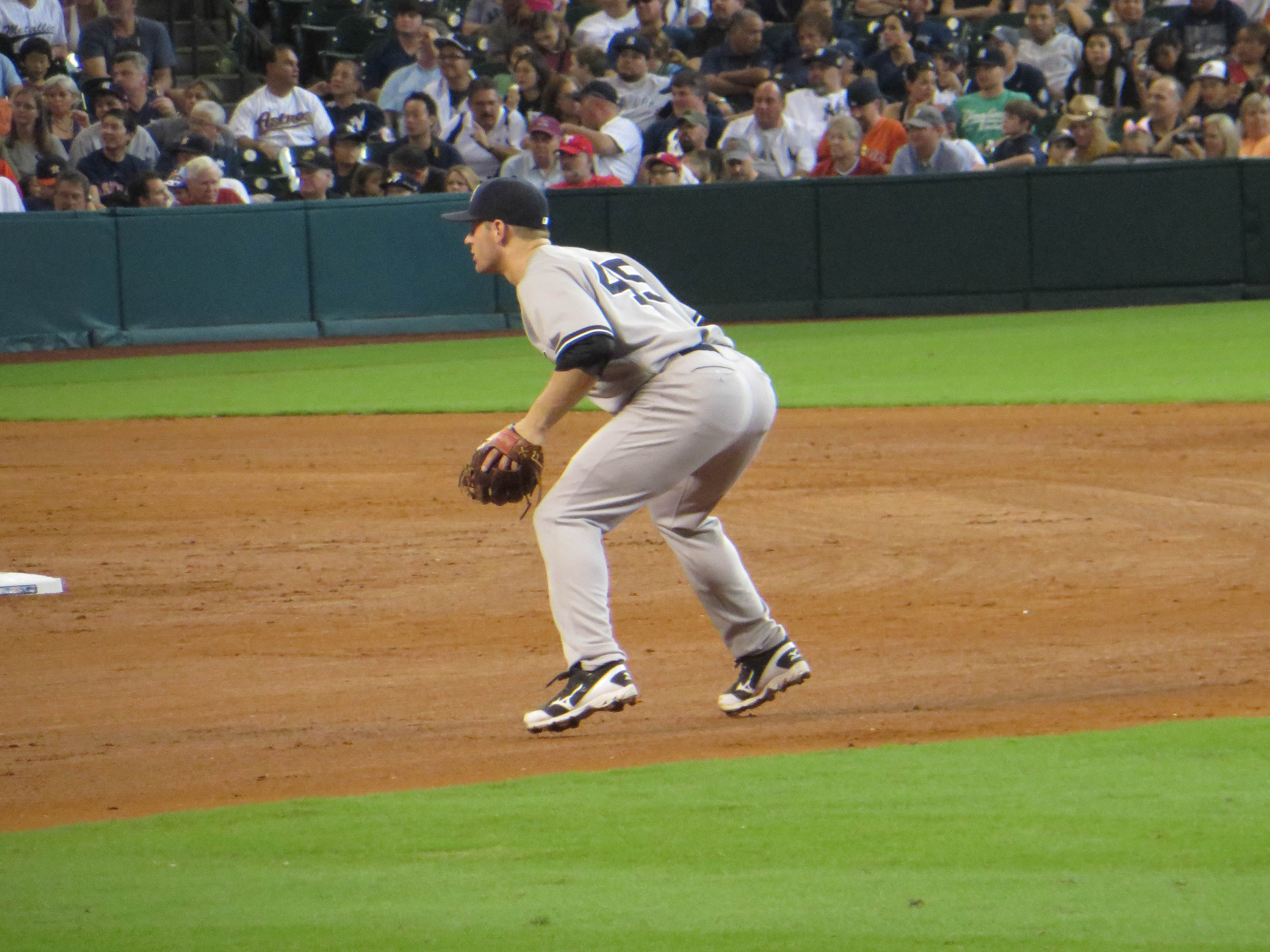
Adams at Minute Maid Park in September 2013.

On March 26, 2013, the Yankees released Adams to make space on the 40-man roster for new acquisition Vernon Wells. The Yankees re-signed him to a minor league contract three days later. After playing in 27 games for the Scranton/Wilkes-Barre RailRiders of the Triple–A International League, in which he batted .316, the Yankees purchased his contract on May 15, the first day he was eligible to be promoted to the majors. Adams made his major league debut on May 15, and recorded his first career hit.

On May 16, 2013, Adams got his first career double and RBI. On May 20, Adams hit his first major league home run off Freddy García in a game against the Baltimore Orioles. He played in 35 games and posted a .190 average, two home runs, and nine RBI until being demoted to Triple–A on July 8. Adams got promoted again from Triple–A on July 24, after Luis Cruz was placed on the disabled list. He was sent down on July 28, to make room when Jayson Nix was activated off the disabled list. On August 5, with Derek Jeter going on the DL, Adams was recalled again from Triple-A Scranton/Wilkes-Barre. He was then optioned back to Triple-A on August 11, in exchange for pitcher Dellin Betances. On September 1, Adams was called up for a fourth time. In 43 games for the Yankees, he slashed .193/.252/.286 with two home runs and 13 RBI. On December 2, Adams was non–tendered by the Yankees, making him a free agent.

=== Baltimore Orioles ===
On December 13, 2013, Adams signed a major league contract with the Cleveland Indians. He was placed on outright waivers on March 22, 2014.

Adams was claimed off waivers by the Baltimore Orioles on March 22, 2014. On May 4, he was removed from the 40–man roster and sent outright to the Double–A Bowie Baysox. In 105 games split between Bowie and the Triple–A Norfolk Tides, Adams slashed .255/.326/.399 with nine home runs and 48 RBI.

=== Miami Marlins ===
On February 11, 2015, Adams signed a minor league contract with the Miami Marlins. He played the entire year with the Double–A Jacksonville Suns.

He played 57 games for the Aguilas del Zulia of the Venezuelan Professional Baseball League during the offseason.

=== Toronto Blue Jays ===
On November 23, 2015, Adams signed a minor league contract with the Toronto Blue Jays that includes an invitation to spring training. In 68 games for the Triple–A Buffalo Bisons, he batted .243/.339/.350 with two home runs, 21 RBI, and three stolen bases. Adams elected free agency following the season on November 7, 2016.

In the offseason, Adams played 16 games for the Tigres de Aragua of the Venezuelan Professional Baseball League.

== Coaching career ==
Adams became the defensive coach for Gulf Coast Yankees in 2017. He served as the team's manager in 2018. In 2019, Adams was named the manager for Staten Island. In 2020, he was hired as the manager of the Tampa Tarpons. He was a defensive coach for the rookie–level Florida Complex League Yankees in 2022. Adams is currently the Director of International Baseball Operations for the New York Yankees.

== Personal life ==
Adams' father, Dale, coached David on his 12-and-under travel team, and at Grandview Prep.
