= Highlands, Texas =

- Census-designated place
- Location in Harris County and the state of Texas
- Coordinates: 29°49′0″N 95°3′34″W
- Country: United States
- State: Texas
- County: Harris

Area
  - Total: 6.5 sq mi (16.9 km^{2})
  - Land: 4.9 sq mi (12.6 km^{2})
  - Water: 1.7 sq mi (4.3 km^{2})
- Elevation: 36 ft (11 m)

Population (2020)
  - Total: 8,612
  - Density: 1,770/sq mi (683/km^{2})
- Time zone: UTC-6 (Central (CST))
  - Summer (DST): UTC-5 (CDT)
- ZIP code: 77562
- Area code: 281
- FIPS code: 48-33836
- GNIS feature ID: 1337750

Highlands is a census-designated place (CDP) located along the Union Pacific Railroad, north of Interstate 10 and west of Farm to Market Road 2100, in an industrialized area of unincorporated Harris County, Texas, United States. The population was 8,612 individuals during the 2020 census.

== History ==
The community was named Highlands because the east bank of the San Jacinto River, where Highlands is located, has a higher elevation than the west bank of the river. By 1908, Highlands became a station on the Beaumont, Sour Lake and Western Railway. A post office opened in 1929. Highlands incorporated in 1930, but its charter was voided, leaving Highlands as unincorporated again. In the 1930s, Highlands had 20 businesses and its population decreased from 350 to 200. The 1936 Harris County highway map indicated two churches, a factory, a school, and a sawmill in Highlands. Highlands housed military members and war plant personnel during World War II. By 1948, Highlands had 3,000 residents and 75 businesses. In the 1950s, local business decreased and the population decreased to 2,723. A 1956 attempt for Highlands to incorporate did not pass. In the 1960s, Highlands had a canning sales company and an industrial chemical company. In the early 1960s, Highlands had 4,336 residents and 82 businesses. In 1965, W. O. Hutson built the Double Trouble Youth Rodeo Arena. In the early 1970s, Highlands had 3,462 residents and 66 businesses. By 1977, Highlands had 5,000 residents; in 1989 Highlands reported the same population. In 1990, Highlands had an estimated population of 6,632.

== Geography ==
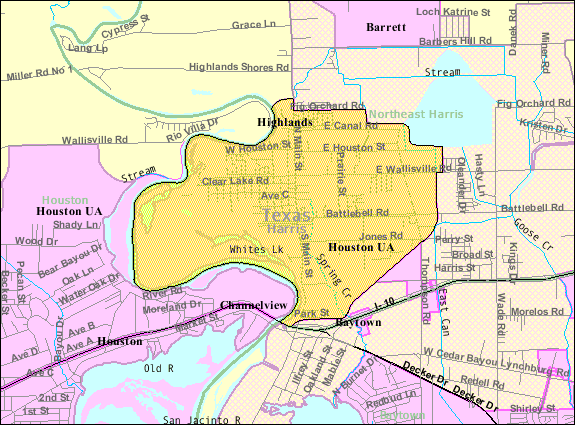
Map of the Highlands CDP

Highlands is located at 29°49′0″N 95°3′34″W (29.816803, -95.059362).

According to the United States Census Bureau, the CDP has a total area of 6.5 square miles (16.9 km^{2}), of which 4.9 square miles (12.6 km^{2}) is land and 1.7 square miles (4.3 km^{2}), or 25.18%, is water. Highlands is located on the banks of the San Jacinto River and the Houston Ship Channel. The majority of the land in Highlands is on a high river bank. The historic Lynchburg Ferry is nearby.

== Demographics ==
Historical population
Census	Pop.	Note	%±
1950	2,725		—
1960	4,336		59.1%
1970	3,462		−20.2%
1980	6,467		86.8%
1990	6,632		2.6%
2000	7,089		6.9%
2010	7,522		6.1%
2020	8,612		14.5%
U.S. Decennial Census; 1850–1900 1910; 1920 1930 1940; 1950 1960 1970; 1980 1990 2000; 2010 2020

Highlands first appeared as an unincorporated community in the 1950 U.S. census; and as a census designated place in the 1980 United States census.

=== 2020 census ===
Highlands CDP, Texas – Racial and ethnic composition Note: the US Census treats Hispanic/Latino as an ethnic category. This table excludes Latinos from the racial categories and assigns them to a separate category. Hispanics/Latinos may be of any race.
Race / Ethnicity (NH = Non-Hispanic)	Pop 2000	Pop 2010	Pop 2020	% 2000	% 2010	% 2020
White alone (NH)	5,929	5,280	4,564	83.64%	70.19%	53.00%
Black or African American alone (NH)	112	229	335	1.58%	3.04%	3.89%
Native American or Alaska Native alone (NH)	29	40	35	0.41%	0.53%	0.41%
Asian alone (NH)	27	27	40	0.38%	0.36%	0.46%
Native Hawaiian or Pacific Islander alone (NH)	1	0	1	0.01%	0.00%	0.01%
Other race alone (NH)	0	9	22	0.00%	0.12%	0.26%
Mixed race or Multiracial (NH)	69	70	271	0.97%	0.93%	3.15%
Hispanic or Latino (any race)	922	1,867	3,344	13.01%	24.82%	38.83%
Total	7,089	7,522	8,612	100.00%	100.00%	100.00%

As of the 2020 United States census, there were 8,612 people, 2,547 households, and 1,766 families residing in the CDP.

As of the census of 2000, there were 7,089 people, 2,564 households, and 1,976 families residing in the CDP. The population density was 1,148.1 inhabitants per square mile (443.3/km^{2}). There were 2,812 housing units at an average density of 455.4 per square mile (175.8/km^{2}). The racial makeup of the CDP was 90.18% White, 1.61% African American, 0.51% Native American, 0.39% Asian, 0.03% Pacific Islander, 5.28% from other races, and 2.00% from two or more races. Hispanic or Latino of any race were 13.01% of the population.

There were 2,564 households, out of which 37.3% had children under the age of 18 living with them, 59.7% were married couples living together, 11.9% had a female householder with no husband present, and 22.9% were non-families. 19.4% of all households were made up of individuals, and 7.2% had someone living alone who was 65 years of age or older. The average household size was 2.75 and the average family size was 3.14.

In the CDP, the population was spread out, with 27.8% under the age of 18, 8.4% from 18 to 24, 29.4% from 25 to 44, 23.6% from 45 to 64, and 10.8% who were 65 years of age or older. The median age was 36 years. For every 100 females, there were 100.8 males. For every 100 females age 18 and over, there were 96.5 males.

The median income for a household in the CDP was $41,288, and the median income for a family was $49,655. Males had a median income of $41,926 versus $25,226 for females. The per capita income for the CDP was $18,556. About 6.7% of families and 9.8% of the population were below the poverty line, including 13.0% of those under age 18 and 6.3% of those age 65 or over.

== Government and infrastructure ==
Highlands is located within Harris County Precinct 3; as of 2008 Ken Jones heads Precinct 3.

The United States Postal Service operates the Highlands Post Office at 608 Main Street.

Harris Health System (formerly Harris County Hospital District) designated Baytown Health Center in Baytown for ZIP code 77562. The nearest public hospital is Lyndon B. Johnson General Hospital in northeast Houston.

== Education ==
=== Primary and secondary schools ===
==== Public schools ====
Highlands students are zoned to schools in the Goose Creek Consolidated Independent School District, though a small portion of the community is within the boundaries of Deer Park Independent School District. Highlands is divided between the Board of Trustees District 1 and the Board of Trustees District 3. As of 2008 Phelitria Barnes and Ken Martin represent the districts, respectively.

Schools in Highlands CDP include Bonnie P. Hopper Elementary School (PK-1), Highlands Elementary School (2-5), and Highlands Junior High School (6-8). Harlem Elementary School (PK-5), outside of the Highlands CDP, serves some areas with Highlands addresses that are not in the CDP. The community is zoned to Goose Creek Memorial High School for high school.

Harlem was originally built in 1923. Highlands Elementary School opened in 1926 as part of the Crosby Independent School District. It joined GCISD in 1928. Highlands Junior High School has existed since 1958. Hopper opened in 1980. Harlem had its current facility built in 1992. During the same year Highlands Elementary's current campus opened. Highland Junior High's current 186,000-square-foot (17,300 m^{2}) campus was funded by a 2005 bond. Goose Creek Memorial opened on August 25, 2008.

==== Private schools ====
The Chinquapin School, a private school for low income students, is located east of the Highlands CDP at 2615 East Wallisville Road. The school opened in 1969.

=== Public libraries ===
Highlands is served by the Stratford Branch Library of Harris County Public Library (HCPL) at 509 Stratford Street. The branch first opened in 1966 in a 1,200-square-foot (110 m^{2}) building. A woman named Anna Stratford donated the property that the library sits on. In 1985 the library was renovated and more space was added, making the library 2,700 square feet.

== Parks and recreation ==
Precinct 2 operates the Highlands Park and the Highlands and San Jacinto Community Centers at 604 Highlands Woods Drive. Highlands Park includes a picnic area, a playground, a lighted walking trail, an open shelter, a lighted basketball pavilion, a lighted tennis court, a covered barbecue pit, an exercise station, a spray park, and toilets. Stratford Park and the Stratford Library are located at 509 Stratford Street. The park includes a picnic area, a playground, an open shelter, a lighted baseball field, and toilets.

== Transportation ==
Harris County Transit operates public transportation.

== Notable people ==
Highlands is the hometown of:

- T. J. Ford, former professional basketball player, who played in the NBA for four teams
- Robert Francois, linebacker for the Green Bay Packers

The lead characters in the TV series Beavis and Butt-head live in the fictional community of Highland, Texas.
