= Texas State Soil and Water Conservation Board =

Soil and water conservation in Texas

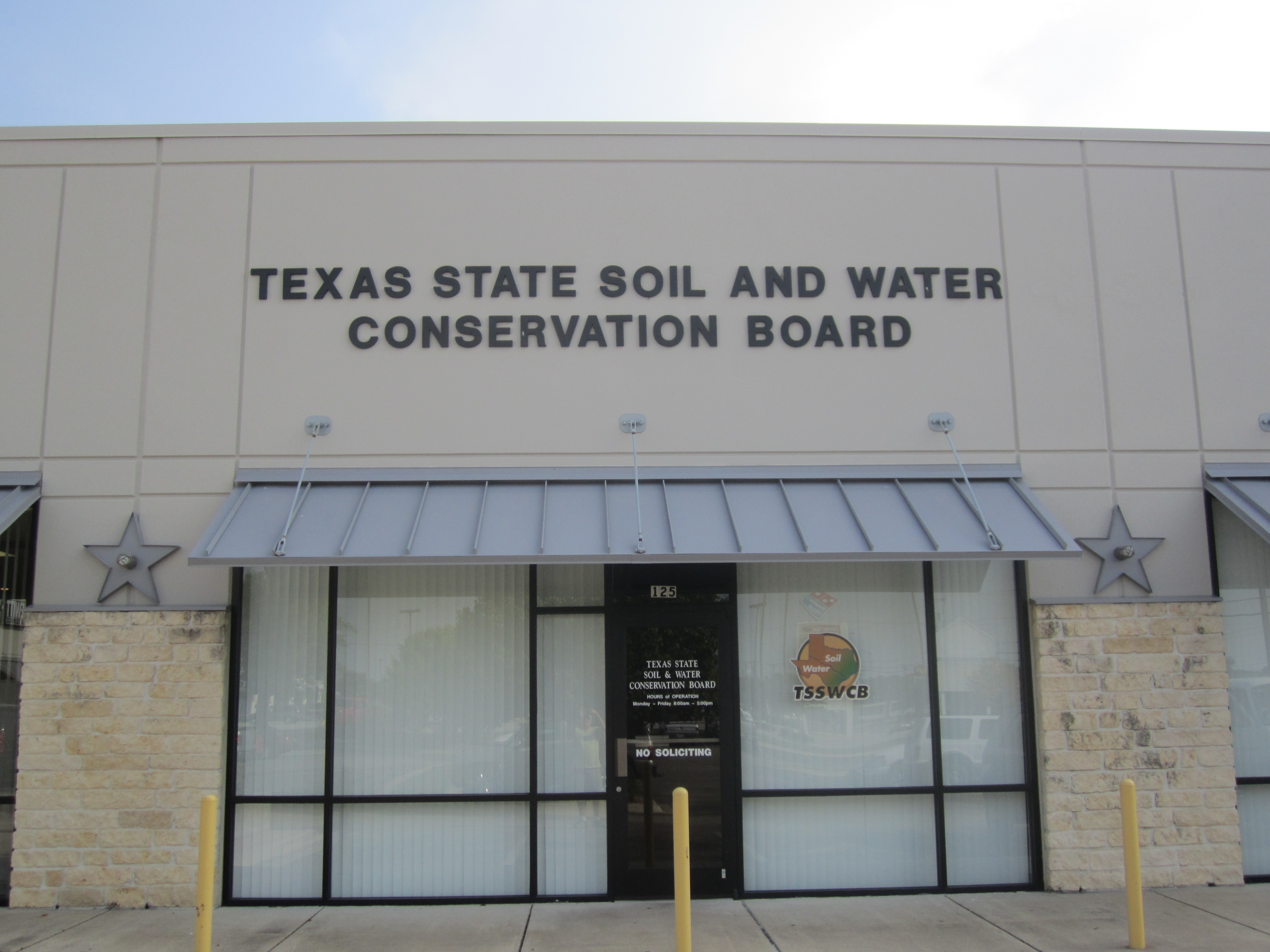
The headquarters of the TSSWCB

The Texas State Soil and Water Conservation Board (TSSWCB) is a state agency of Texas, headquartered in Temple. The commission exists to help conserve the soil and water and protect it from pollution.

The TSSWCB was formed on May 29, 1939, by the Texas Legislature, and was originally called the State Soil Conservation Board. It organized a board with five members, each from a different one of the five districts in the state. The first executive director was V. C. Marshall, who was promoted to the role from his board position. In 1949, the conservation zones were expanded from five to sixteen, which became 211 by 1991. The name was changed to the Texas State Soil and Water Conservation Board in 1965.

The TSSWCB is supported by funding from several sources, including both state and federal funds. Over time, the agency's budget increased to support additional programs; in fiscal year 2010 its budget exceeded $28,000,000. In 2019 the legislature appropriated $150,000,000 to the TSSWCB from the "Rainy Day Fund" to support dam infrastructure programs after Hurricane Harvey. To conserve water and soil, the TSSWCB has funded the creation of terraces, over 1 billion feet of them. It also prevents flooding.

In 2025, the TSSWCB was accused of nepotism after the commission awarded a contract for a company a board member's son previously worked at, despite the fact the company having not bid to do the job.
