= McNair, Texas =

Area in Texas, US

Coordinates: 29°48′15″N 95°01′18″W

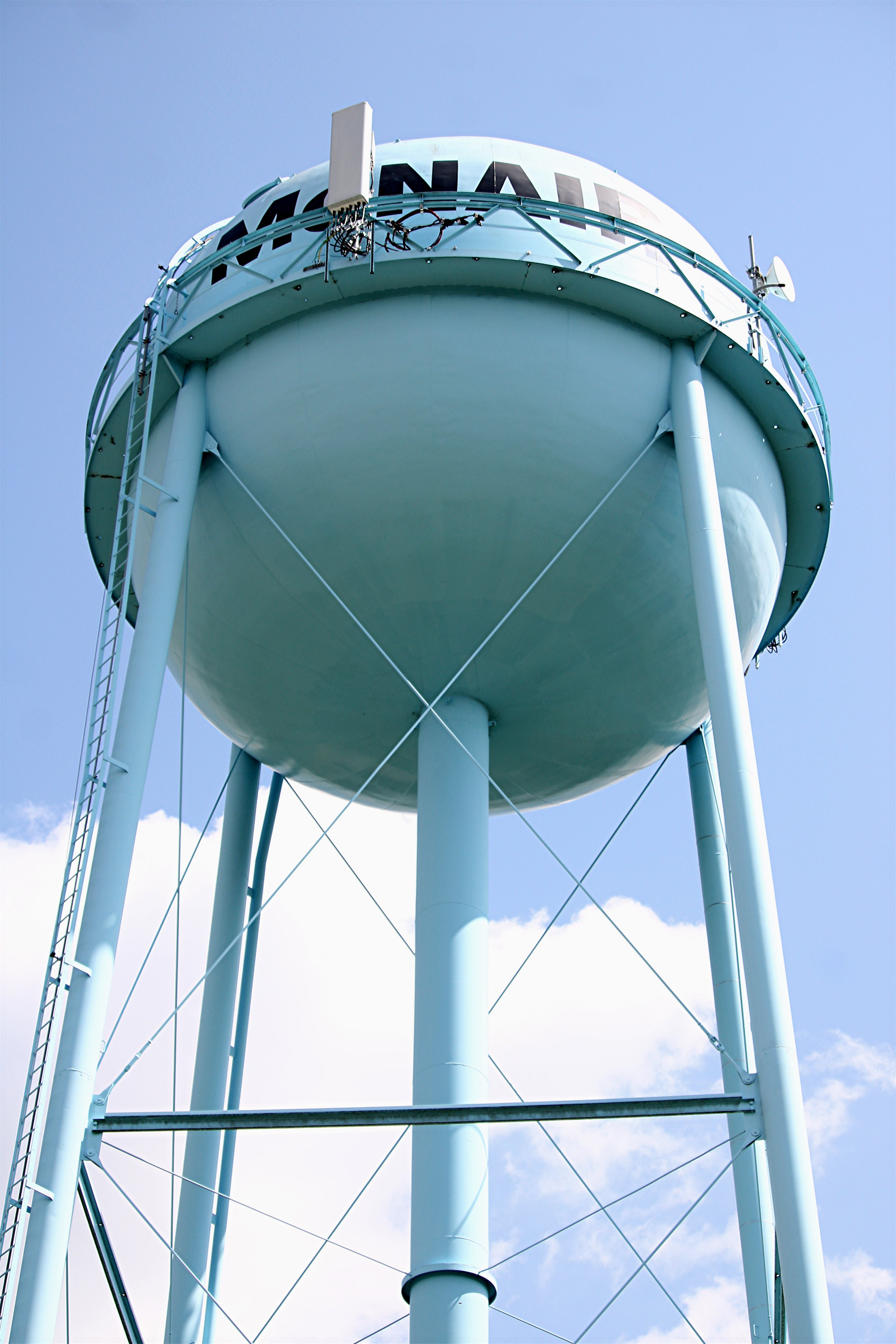
Water tower

McNair is an area in east central Harris County, Texas, United States, which originated as an African-American community. Much of it is unincorporated; portions are within Baytown.

== Education ==
Goose Creek Independent School District operates public schools and Lee College provides higher educational opportunities for residents in the area. Lee College McNair Career Center at I-10 provides a state-of-the-art cosmetology facility for students and patrons. There are plans to expand in 2011 to provide pipefitting, welding and heavy-equipment training. If all goes well, Harris County Public Library will then partner with Lee College to build a new McNair branch library on the same career center parcel.

Goose Creek Memorial is the new high school for McNair residents. Highlands Junior High is the feeder junior school and Harlem Elementary is the feeder elementary school.

The 400-person capacity J.D. Walker Community Center has been a stepping stone for the McNair community since first opening in 1978. This facility houses a basketball court, tennis courts, computer lab, and the East Harris County Youth Program, which helps educate and mold the youth of McNair and surrounding communities. A Head Start program is housed next to the facility.
