= Grogan's Point =

- Neighborhood
- Country: United States
- State: Texas
- County: Montgomery County
- City: The Woodlands
- Village: Grogan's Mill
- Established: 1982

Area
  - Land: 1.25 sq mi (3.2 km^{2})

Population
  - Total: 465 estates
- Website: http://groganspoint.org

Grogan’s Point is an estate neighborhood and golf course community in the Village of Grogan’s Mill of The Woodlands, a planned community in Texas.

Established in 1982, it is third of nine estate neighborhoods developed in The Woodlands. Its namesake is the Grogan-Cochran Lumber Company, the last sawmill to operate in the area. It is characterized by large residences on large land lots. It consists of 800 acres, 465 estates, 3 parks, and 2 ponds. It borders the 13th hole of The Oaks Golf Course of The Woodlands Resort, which is ranked by Golf Digest as one of the best golf resorts in North America.

Grogan's Point is known for the six historic-inspired estates built by the Westbrook Building Company. It was a prominent neighborhood for many Enron executives and remains closely linked to the energy industry due to the proximity of ExxonMobil's main campus.

== History ==
Grogan's Point was initially envisioned as an equestrian community, emphasizing George Mitchell's founding vision of The Woodlands staying close to nature. As development of the Grogan's Mill Village began in 1972, it was stalled by the 1970s energy crisis, which significantly affected Greater Houston due to its standing as the "Energy capital of the world." To attract buyers from River Oaks and Memorial, the plan was changed to build an estate neighborhood characterized by large residences on large land lots. Development was led by Wally and Leo Westbrook of the Westbrook Building Company, who constructed the first 80 estates. Grogan's Point success became the model for estate neighborhoods future villages would follow, including West Isle (1988), Windward Cove (1990), The Cove (1991), Carlton Woods (1998), Carlton Woods Creekside (2007), and East Shore (2008).

Development of Grogan's Point commenced in three main phases:

- Phase 1 (1982-1990), Grogans Point Rd, Watertree, Longspur, Southgate
- Phase 2 (1993-1999), Red Sable, Northgate, N. Tranquil Path, Hillock Woods
- Phase 3 (2004-2011), S. Tranquil Path, Starlight, Angel Leaf

=== Flooding ===
Grogan's Point is encircled by Spring Creek and Panther Creek and has been increasingly challenged by flooding potentially due to climate change. Following the flooding of Hurricane Harvey, Texas Governor Greg Abbott directed the San Jacinto River Authority in April 2018 to "find ways to mitigate flooding" in neighborhoods such as Grogan's Point. In October 2018, The Woodlands Water Agency proposed a project "to enlarge four box culverts," for Grogan's Point. As of July 2019, mitigation efforts are still underway.

Major floods

- October 1994, Flood of Record
- June 2001, Tropical Storm Allison
- August 2017, Hurricane Harvey

Minor floods

- August 2005, Hurricane Katrina
- August 2007, Tropical Storm Erin
- September 2008, Hurricane Ike
- May 2015, Texas–Oklahoma Flood and Tornado Outbreak
- April 2016, North American Storm Complex
- May 2016, North American Storm Complex

== Governance ==
Grogan's Point falls under the governance of the Grogan's Mill Village Association, and in-turn, The Woodlands Township, a special-purpose district created by the 73rd Texas Legislature in 1993. The Woodlands is not a city nor a traditional township government, however it still provides limited municipal government services such as trash pickup, parks and recreation, covenant enforcement, fire and rescue services, streetscaping, economic development, and enhanced law enforcement and security patrols.

Grogan's Point Residents' Association is a voluntary social membership organization for residents. Affiliate membership is available for former residents. It is governed by bylaws. The stated mission of GPRA is to "promote a beautiful, safe, vibrant, friendly, and informed community for all residents of Grogan’s Point."

== Amenities ==
- The Woodlands Resort
  - 500 acres
  - 4 restaurants
  - The Oaks and Panther Trail Golf Courses
  - Forest Oasis Waterpark and Lazy river
  - 21 outdoor and indoor tennis courts
  - Two swimming pools, three whirlpools
  - Spa and Fitness Center
  - 402 hotel rooms
  - Conference Center with 33 meeting rooms
  - Direct access to 200+ miles of nature trails throughout Woodlands
- Grogan's Point Park
  - 7 acres
  - Basketball, Tennis, and Volleyball courts, Soccer field and Swing Set
  - Pavilion, Picnic tables, BBQ pits, Drinking fountains, Restrooms, Parking
- Mel Killian Park
  - Fishing
- Pastoral Pond Park
  - Fishing
- Hike and Jog
  - 2 mile paved track spanning Grogan's Point Rd
  - Direct access to 200+ miles of nature trails throughout Woodlands

== Notable estates ==
- The Antebellum, inspired by the Houmas House Plantation and Gardens
  - 62 Grogans Point Rd
  - Built in 1988 by the Westbrook Building Company
  - 8,372 sqft
  - 1.54 acres
- Carpenter Estate, inspired by the Château de Lucé
  - 206 N Tranquil Path
  - Built in 1996 by the Westbrook Building Company
  - 8,400 sqft
  - 2 acres
- Governor's Estate, inspired by the Texas Governor's Mansion
  - 3 Misty Grove
  - Built in 1990 by the Westbrook Building Company
  - 9,851 sqft
  - 0.89 acres
- Rovirosa Estate, 2nd largest estate in Grogan's Point
  - 47 N Longspur
  - Built in 1985
  - 17,707 sqft
  - 2.83 acres
- Oak Alley, inspired by the Oak Alley Plantation
  - 86 Red Sable
  - Built in 1994 by the Westbrook Building Company
  - 9,707 sqft
  - 1.48 acres
- Pew Estate, 3rd largest estate in Grogan's Point
  - 66 Red Sable
  - Built in 1992 by the Westbrook Building Company
  - 16,621 sqft
  - 1.69 acres
- Powell Estate, largest land lot in Grogan's Point
  - 126 S Tranquil Path
  - Built in 2004
  - 10,582 sqft
  - 8.95 acres
- Turek Compound, largest estate in Grogan's Point
  - 199 N Tranquil Path
    - Built in 1999, inspired by the White House northern facing facade
    - 8,805 sqft
    - 2.03 acres
  - 203 N Tranquil Path Dr
    - Built in 2014, inspired by the West Wing
    - 19,513 sqft
    - 2.29 acres
- Thistle Hill, inspired by the Wharton–Scott House
  - 38 Grogans Point Rd
  - Built in 1989 by the Westbrook Building Company
  - 6,549 sqft
  - 0.71 acres

== Notable residents ==
- Adrian Peterson
- Josh Lowrey Entrepreneur and Host of Oilfield 360 Podcast
- Lyle Lovett
- Robert Marling
- Patrick Reed 2018 Masters Champion
- Alexandro Rovirosa Martinez, founder and chief executive at Roma Energy

== See also ==
- George P. Mitchell
- The Woodlands
- The Woodlands Resort
- Cynthia Woods Mitchell Pavilion
