= Grogan's Mill =

- Village of The Woodlands

- Seal

- Coordinates: 30°7′55.412″N 95°29′29.056″W
- Country: United States
- State: Texas
- County: Montgomery
- CDP: The Woodlands
- Established: 1972

Population
  - Total: ~13,000
- Website: http://grogansmill.org

Grogan's Mill (officially the Village of Grogan's Mill) is a village of The Woodlands, a planned community in Texas.

Established in 1972, it is the first of ten villages developed in The Woodlands. Its namesake is the Grogan-Cochran Lumber Company, the last sawmill to operate in the area. It consists of approximately 5,100 homes and 13,000 residents in 22 neighborhoods and over 50 businesses. Its most notable amenity is The Woodlands Resort & Conference Center and most notable resident was George P. Mitchell.

== History ==
Before Spanish Texas, Mexican Texas, and the Republic of Texas, the Grogan's Mill territory was likely inhabited by the Bidai. From the 1850s to 1950s, the territory was closely linked to the history of the timber industry in Montgomery County, which had more sawmills than any other county in East Texas. From 1918 to 1964, the Grogan Cochran Lumber Company operated the final mill in the area before selling 2,800 acres to George Mitchell. Mitchell acquired an additional 14,655 acres over the ensuing years for the development of a planned community called The Woodlands.

Development of Grogan's Mill, the first of ten villages, began in the fall of 1972. The Information Center was finished in 1973 and the Wharf and Conference Center (today as The Woodlands Resort) was finished in late 1974. Growth stalled until 1976 due to the 1970s energy crisis. Development of The Woodlands first estate neighborhoods began in 1980. Initially envisioned as an equestrian community, Grogan's Point became the model for estate neighborhoods later villages would follow.

== Governance ==
Grogan's Mill Village is administered by the Grogan's Mill Village Association (GMVA), which falls under the governance of The Woodlands Township, a special-purpose district created by the 73rd Texas Legislature in 1993. The Woodlands is not a city nor a traditional township government, however it still provides limited municipal government services such as trash pickup, parks and recreation, covenant enforcement, fire and rescue services, streetscaping, economic development, and enhanced law enforcement and security patrols.

The Grogan's Mill Village Association provides a forum for village-centric civic and social issues and opportunities. All residents over the age of 18 are members of the association who are able to elect its 15 governing officers, whom are governed by the association bylaws.

=== Committees ===
GMVA maintains committees, which are support by a chairman and at least one member, and report to the GMVA board.

== Amenities ==
=== Commercial ===
- Grogan's Mill Village Center
- The Woodlands Country Club Oaks Clubhouse
- The Woodlands Resort & Conference Center
- The Woodlands Sports Park
- The Woodlands Swim and Athletic Center (defunct, 1975-2008)
  - Training facility of Laura Wilkinson

=== Parks and Lakes ===
==== Major ====
- Sawmill Park
- Tamarac Park
- Lake Harrison

==== Minor ====
- Cokeberry Pond Park
- Grogan's Point Park
- High Oaks Park
- Loggers Hollow Park
- Maplewood Park
- Mel Killian Park
- Millbend Loop Linear Park
- Pastoral Pond Park
- Sunset Springs Park

== Neighborhoods ==
Grogan's Mill consists of approximately 5,100 homes and 13,000 residents in 22 neighborhoods.

=== Estate ===
- Grogan's Point
- Wilding Estates
- Doe Run

=== High ===
- The Enclave at Mill Point
- Fairway Oaks
- Millbend Forest
- Tamarac Woods
- Woodmill Creek

=== Mid-high ===
- Arbor
- Avana
- Elm Branch
- High Oaks
- Pheasant Run
- Sawmill Woods
- Settler's Corner
- Stonemill Courts
- Sunset Springs
- Tall Forest
- Timber Top
- West High Oaks
- Windwood
- Woodfarm

== Education ==
- Hailey Elementary
- Knox Junior High School
- Lamar Elementary
- Paddington British Private School
- Teach-A-Tot Child Development Center
- Wilkerson Intermediate

== Notable people ==
- Adrian Peterson
- George P. Mitchell (founder of The Woodlands)
- Lyle Lovett
- Robert Marling

== See also ==
- Grogan's Point
- The Woodlands, TX
