= The Woodlands Mall =

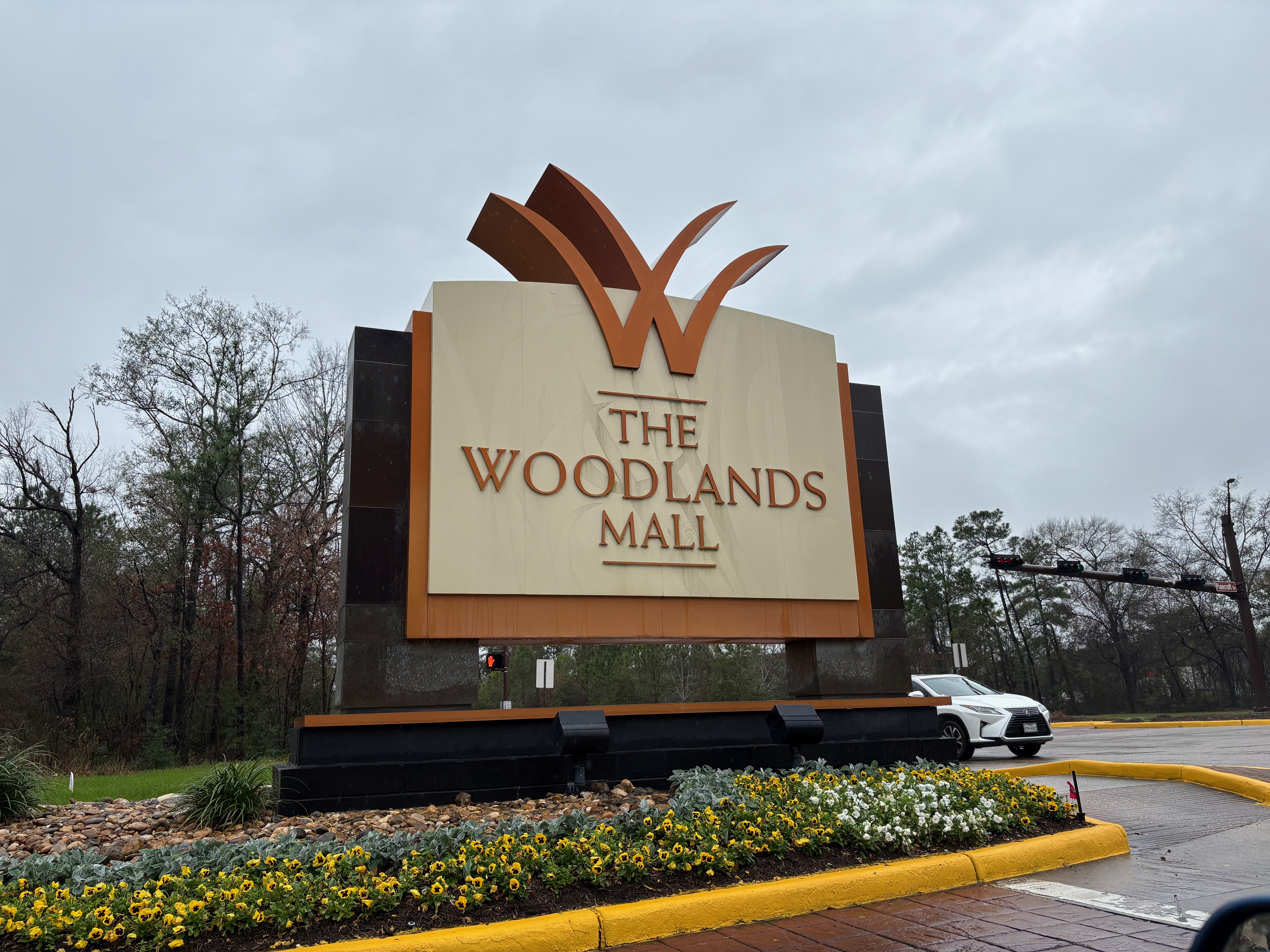
- Location: The Woodlands, Texas, United States
- Coordinates: 30.164°N 95.45543°W
- Address: 1201 Lake Woodlands Drive
- Opened: October 5, 1994; 32 years ago
- Developer: Homart Development Company and The Woodlands Corporation
- Manager: GGP
- Owner: GGP
- Num. of stores: 160
- Num. of anchor tenants: 6
- Floor area: 1,355,000 sq ft (125,900 m^{2})
- Floors: 2
- Website: www.thewoodlandsmall.com

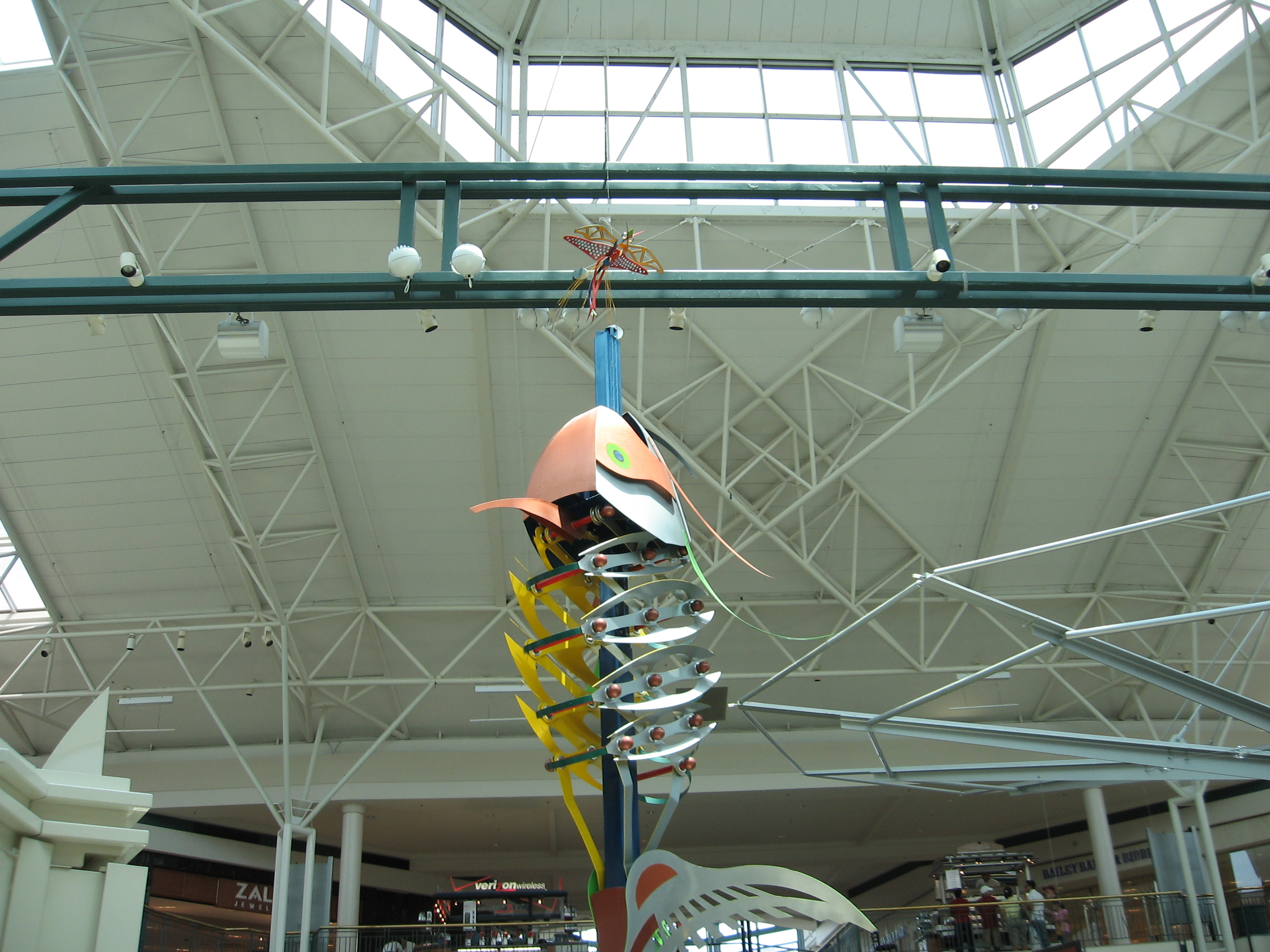
Inside The Woodlands Mall

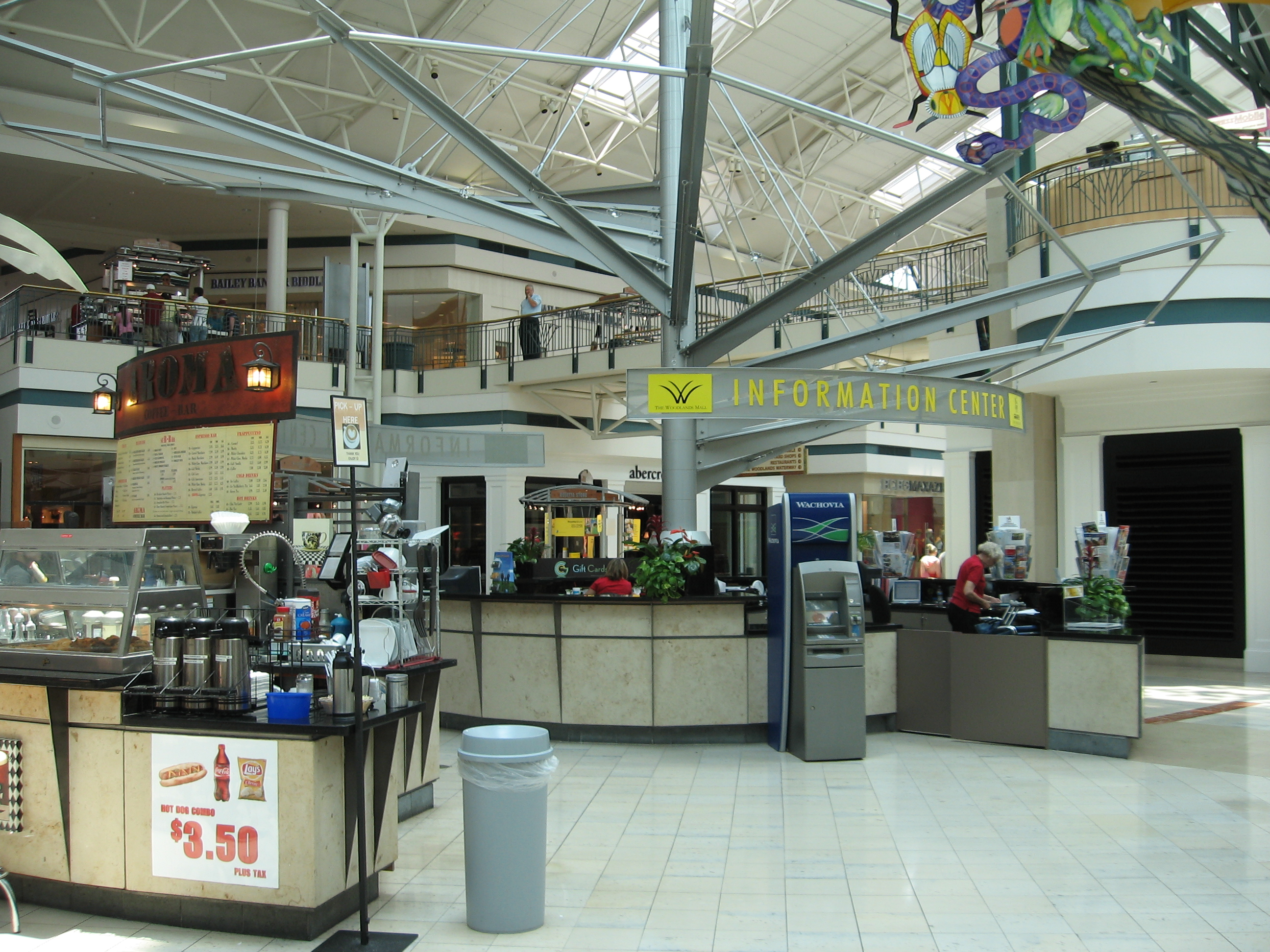
Information Desk

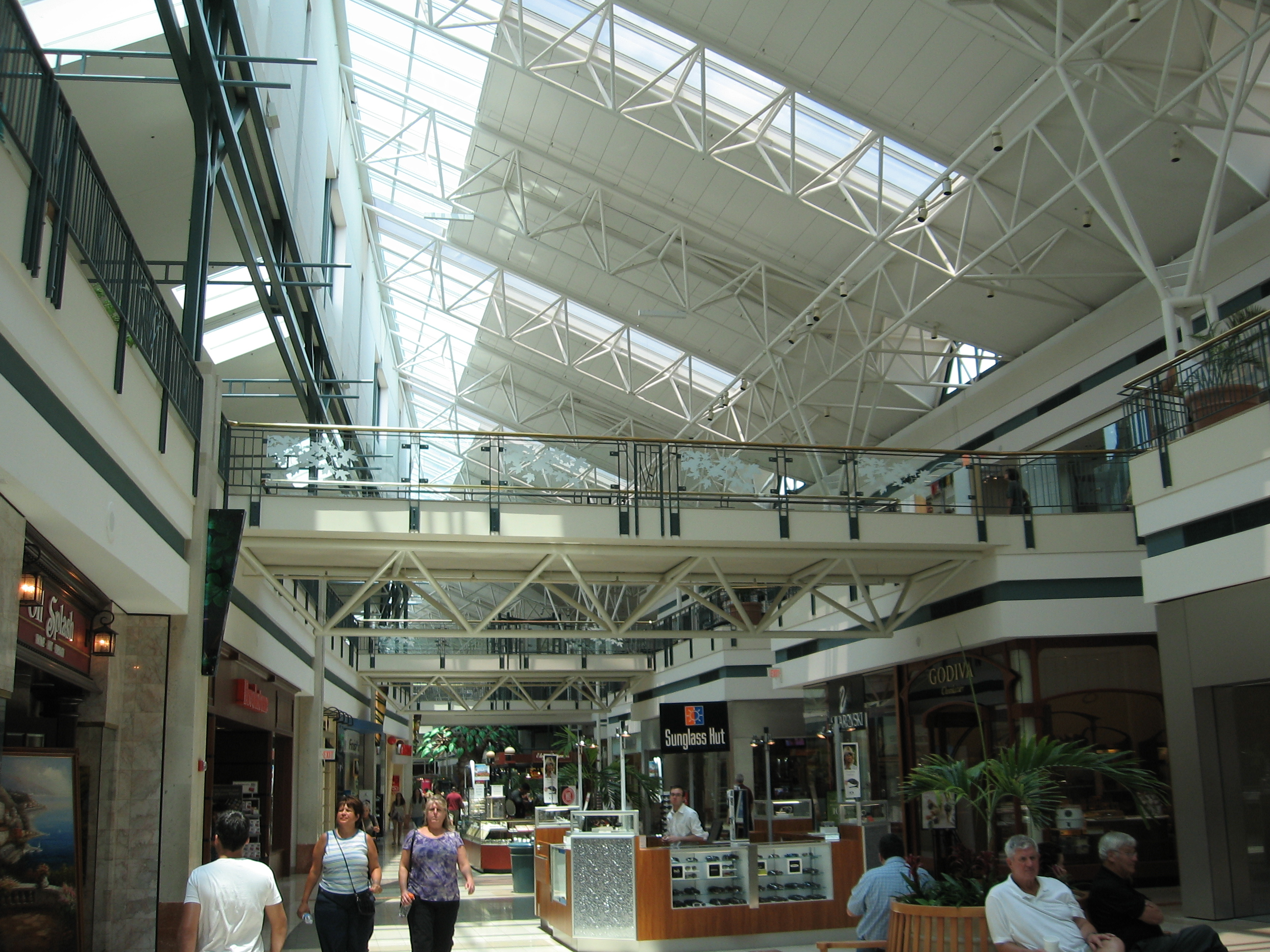
Inside The Woodlands Mall

The Woodlands Mall is a two-story, enclosed shopping mall located at the intersection of Interstate 45 and Lake Woodlands Drive in the community of The Woodlands in unincorporated Montgomery County, Texas, United States, north of Houston. The Woodlands Mall features five anchor stores: Dick's Sporting Goods, Dillard's, JCPenney, Macy's, and Nordstrom. With a gross leasable area of 1,350,000 square feet (125,000 m^{2}), The Woodlands Mall is considered a super-regional mall by industry definitions. The Woodlands Mall is managed by GGP.

== History ==
The Woodlands, originally developed in 1974 by George Mitchell as a resort-oriented and master-planned community, began to rapidly grow with an influx of new families from Houston and other areas. It also gained national prominence from being both host to the Shell Houston Open and home to the Cynthia Woods Mitchell Pavilion, which opened in 1990. By the 1990s, the community had grown to the point where a new super-regional mall became a key priority of the community's developer, The Woodlands Corporation, who sought to develop the mall as part of its Town Center development.

The Woodlands Mall opened on October 5, 1994, with over 120 stores, including anchor tenants Dillard's, Foley's, Mervyn's and Sears, whose Homart Development Company jointly built the mall with The Woodlands Corporation. This was the final development by Homart, which was acquired by General Growth Properties the following year. In addition, the mall also contained a carousel and adjacent food court on its upper level, and several restaurants and smaller retailers on the periphery.

Before The Woodlands Mall opened, retail offerings in The Woodlands were largely limited to grocery-anchored neighborhood village centers as well as a smaller-scale mall known as The Wharf located in the village of Grogan's Mill, and many residents of The Woodlands and Montgomery County (as well as the nearby community of Huntsville further north) traveled to Greenspoint Mall in north Houston for broader retail options, with many also opting to travel further down the North Freeway via opposite ends of FM 1960 to Willowbrook Mall or Deerbrook Mall (respectively northwest and northeast of Houston, and coincidentally also developed by Homart) for broader shopping options. Greenspoint was the mall most directly impacted by The Woodlands Mall's opening, as Greenspoint consequently lost virtually all of its most critical (and most affluent) customer base, though Greenspoint already had been in decline due to competition from the more popular offerings at Willowbrook and Deerbrook (which sustained themselves due to rapid suburban growth in their respective trade areas), as well as increased criminal activity within the Greenspoint area that further drove shoppers away from Greenspoint Mall.

In 1998, JCPenney opened in an empty anchor space situated between Sears and Dillard's in the mall's northeast corner. In 2004, a 150,000-square-foot (14,000 m^{2}) outdoor section was added featuring a Barnes & Noble bookstore, several upscale shops, and Class A office space, as well as a 1.4-mile (2.3 km) waterway, which features a water taxi. In April 2007, the mall partnered with NearbyNow, a digital applications company based in California, to offer shoppers a service that allows them to search for items at the mall through their cell phones or home computers.

Since The Woodlands Mall's opening, there were 5 anchor changes:

- In 2005, Mervyn's closed all its locations in Greater Houston; the chain eventually went out of business in 2008. Mervyn's space was filled by both the Woodlands Children's Museum, and the Woodlands Xploration Station (the latter a satellite facility of the Houston Museum of Natural Science); both were later replaced in August 2010 with the largest Forever 21 location in Greater Houston.
- In September 2006, another original anchor, Houston-based Foley's was converted to Macy's as a result of Federated Department Stores acquiring Foley's parent company, May Department Stores.
- At the beginning of 2013, Sears (the mall's original joint developer) closed its location at The Woodlands Mall after selling its lease back to the owner of the mall, as the once-prominent retailer began to eventually close and sell off almost all of its locations and become moribund. Nordstrom replaced Sears, opening its second full-service location in the Houston area in September 2014 along with several new specialty stores, some of them in new specialty space carved out of the former Sears store, which was demolished to make way for the newly built Nordstrom.
- In 2016, Dick's Sporting Goods opened a two-story location in the mall's last remaining anchor space, located at its southeast corner between the main entrance of the mall and Dillard's, as part of the chain's entry into the Houston area with six locations (including at The Woodlands Mall and all four of its sister malls in the Houston area).
- In 2025, Forever 21 permanently closed its store at the mall as part of its plan to downsize the company and reduce costs.
