= ARCI =

ARCI or Arci may refer to:

- Addiction Research Center Inventory, a questionnaire for assessing effects of psychoactive drugs
- Aid Refugee Chinese Intellectuals, an initiative by the United States during the early 1950s to assist educated ethnic Chinese fleeing the Communist regime in China
- Associazione Ricreativa e Culturale Italiana, an Italian non-profit association
- Autosomal recessive congenital ichthyosis, a type of skin disorder
- Ayn Rand Center Israel, affiliated with the Ayn Rand Institute, an American non-profit
- International Advanced Research Centre for Powder Metallurgy & New Materials (ARCI), in the Department of Science and Technology (India)
- Arci Kempner (born 1934), Brazilian archer
- Arci Muñoz (born 1989), Filipino actress

== See also ==
- Arcis (disambiguation)
- Arkoi, a small Greek island
