= The Woodlands Country Club =

Golf club in The Woodlands, Texas, US

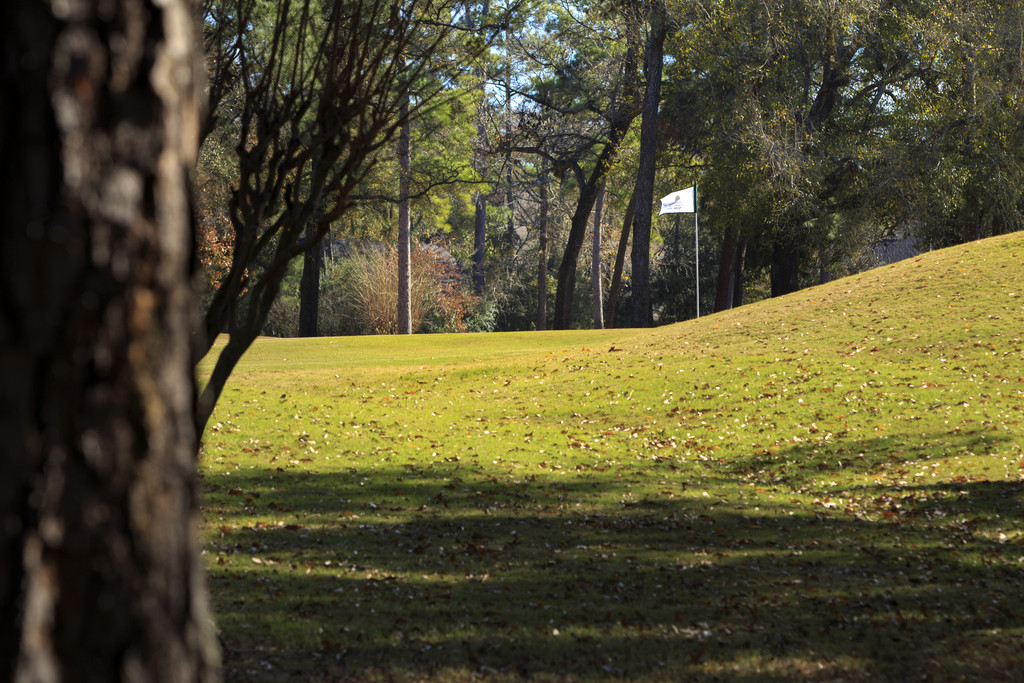
- Fifth hole of the Tournament Course in 2015

- Location within the United States Location within Texas
- 30.145°N 95.463°W

Club information
- Location: The Woodlands, Texas, U.S.
- Elevation: 140 feet (43 m)
- Established: 1978; 48 years ago
- Type: semi private
- Owner: Arcis
- Total holes: 63
- Website: thewoodlandscc.com

Tournament Course
- Designed by: Robert von Hagge, Bruce Devlin
- Par: 72
- Length: 7,025 yards (6,424 m)
- Course rating: 74.4
- Slope rating: 138

Palmer Course
- Designed by: Arnold Palmer
- Par: 72 (King / General)
- Length: 7,199 yards (6,583 m)
- Course rating: 75.2 (King / General)
- Slope rating: 140

Player Course
- Designed by: Gary Player
- Par: 72
- Length: 7,115 yards (6,506 m)
- Course rating: 74.7
- Slope rating: 148

The Woodlands Country Club is a private golf club in the southern United States, located in The Woodlands, Texas, a suburb north of Houston. The 99-hole complex comprises five courses: Tournament Course, Palmer Course (27 holes), Player Course, North Course, and West Course.

== Tournament Course ==
From 1985 to 2004, the Tournament Course was known as the TPC at The Woodlands, and it has a driving range and putting green. The members-only dining room offers a view of the 18th green and driving range, as well as opening to an outside deck that features a comfortable lounge area, table seating, a fireplace and a large flat screen TV. The main dining area boasts three large flat screens, a fireplace and a beautiful bar.

Originally designed by Robert von Hagge and tour player Bruce Devlin in 1978, it was the long-time home of the Houston Open on the PGA Tour (1985–2002), and hosted the LPGA Tour's Samsung World Championship in 2003. Winners at the course include major champions Raymond Floyd, Payne Stewart, Hal Sutton, Vijay Singh, Curtis Strange, Mark Brooks, and David Duval. On the PGA Tour Champions, it has been the site of the Insperity Invitational since 2008. The event is televised on Golf Channel.

== Palmer Course ==
Opened in 1990 and designed by Arnold Palmer, it later expanded to 27 holes. The original two nines are named King and General; the third is Deacon, after his father, and opened in 1995. The course has a large practice facility, with a putting and separate chipping facility.

== Player Course ==
Designed by Gary Player, the 18-hole course opened in 2002. Eleven of its holes have water in play, and the course is equipped with a large practice facility, with a putting and separate chipping green. The course has a clubhouse, with a pro-shop and store. The Clubhouse also has a cafe. The course also has an indoor room for the golf performance center.

== Clubhouse ==
The 33,000-square-foot (3,100 m^{2}) clubhouse houses a grill, and library for members to have small meetings. There is a full-bar, and a small bar for the men below the main floor. There is a window-serve snack bar on the lower floor, along with the pro-shop.
A new building is being built that will house another dining room, and other rooms which are with the status TBD.

== Ownership ==
Arcis purchased The Woodlands Country Club from ClubCorp in 2025.
