= Greenspoint, Houston =

Coordinates: 29°56′49″N 95°24′23″W

Greenspoint
- Neighborhood
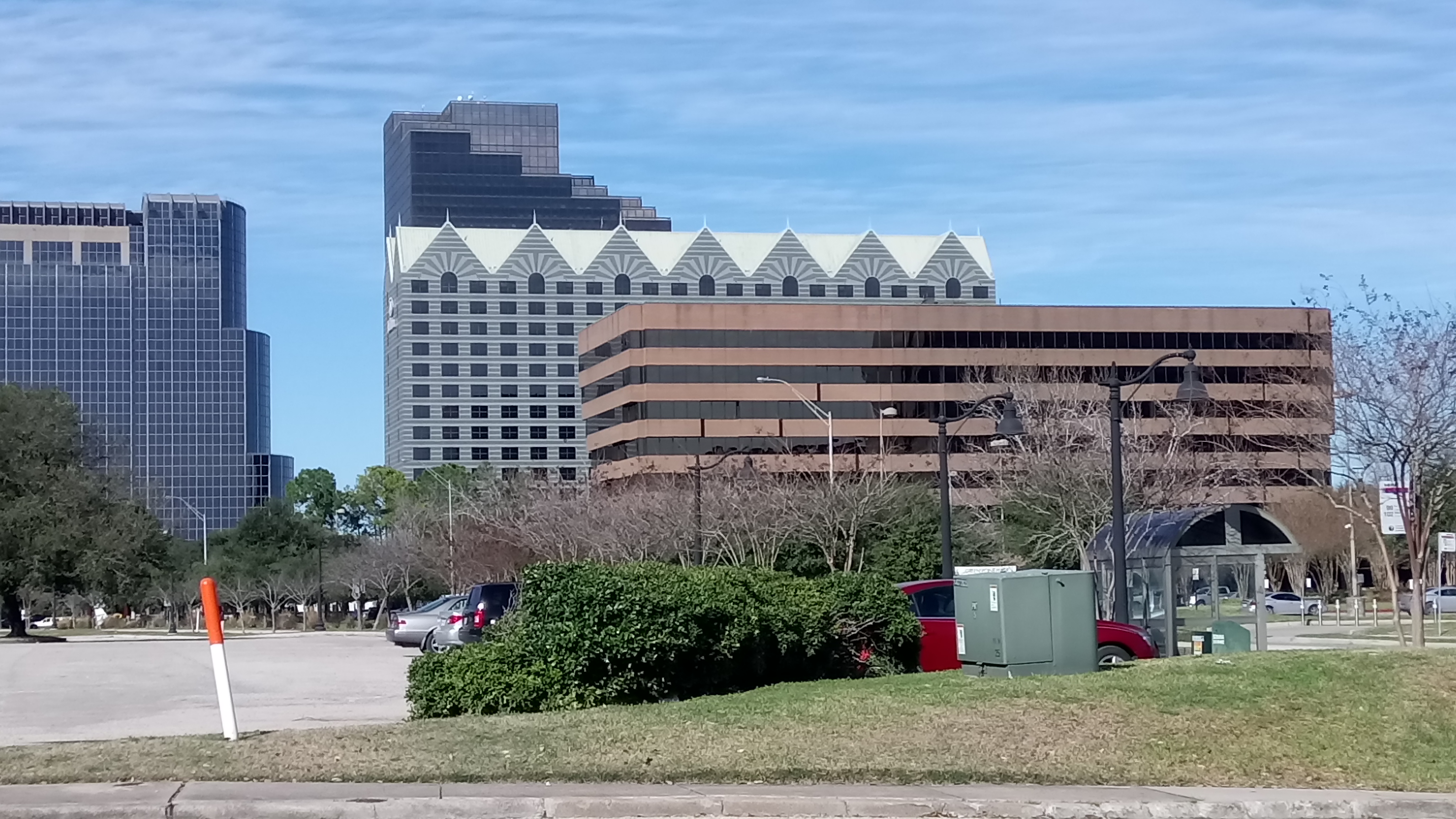
- Interactive map of Greenspoint
- Country: United States
- State: Texas
- County: Harris
- City: Houston

Area
  - Total: 6.96 sq mi (18.0 km^{2})

Population (2012)
  - Total: 42,569
  - Density: 6,120/sq mi (2,360/km^{2})
- ZIP Code: 77037
- Area codes: 281, 346, 713, 832

Greater Greenspoint is a 7-square-mile (18 km^{2}) a suburban neighborhood in northern Harris County, Texas, United States, located mostly within the city limits of Houston. Centered around the junction of Interstate 45 and Texas State Highway Beltway 8 near George Bush Intercontinental Airport, the area is a classic example of a planned edge city. The initial 2,000-acre (8.1 km^{2}) retail and office development centered around Greenspoint Mall was a project of the Friendswood Development Company during the 1970s and early 1980s.

In order to create new infrastructure, boost public services (particularly safety), and spearhead urban planning, the Texas Legislature created the North Houston District in 1991. This special government entity is bounded by the Hardy Toll Road to the east, Airtex Boulevard to the north, Veterans Memorial Drive to the west, and West Road to the south.

== Geography ==
Greenspoint is located at the junction of two major regional highways, Interstate 45 (the North Freeway) and Texas State Highway Beltway 8 and is only 6 miles (9.7 km) west of George Bush Intercontinental Airport (IAH).

The area is straddled by Greens Bayou, a major tributary of Buffalo Bayou which flows from west to east. The bayou was extensively channelized in the 1970s to improve drainage from the then-new airport; however, rapid development within its environs has compromised its ability to handle high-volume rainfall events. Over Construction also overwhelmed the bayou with uncontrolled sewage overflows in the 1970s and 1980s, and the waterway continues to struggle with water quality issues.

In 2005, the Houston–Galveston Area Council identified Greenspoint as one of the most hazardous communities in Houston for pedestrians.

== Demographics ==
The Greater Greenspoint super neighborhood, as defined by the City of Houston, had an estimated population of 42,569 people in 2012. There were 13,859 households, of which 9,235 were family households.

Greenspoint is overwhelmingly majority minority. The population is 5% non-Hispanic white, 29% non-Hispanic black, 66% Hispanic, and 1% Asian. In the 2000 Census, the district was 10% non-Hispanic white, 34% non-Hispanic black, 53% Hispanic, 2% Asian, and 1% other. Greenspoint's proportion of black and Hispanic people is significantly greater than that for Houston as a whole; the city was 26% non-Hispanic white, 23% non-Hispanic black, and 44% Hispanic in 2012.

Since the 1980s, the proportion of families in Greenspoint has dramatically increased. In 2012, there were 13,859 households, of which 9,235 were family households. Between 1990 and 2010, the number of people under the age of 18 in Greenspoint increased nearly sixfold, indicating the departure of young professionals and their replacement with low-income families in the area's apartment complexes. The proportion of Greenspoint residents under 5 years of age is nearly double the city of Houston's.

The Greenspoint area's median household income is significantly lower than the City of Houston's – $26,823 versus $44,648 in 2012. Greenspoint's median household income declined slightly between 2000 and 2012 despite a 22% increase in the city's overall median household income during the same period. A plurality (48%) of Greenspoint's residents make less than $25,000 per year.

Greenspoint's population has lower levels of educational attainment than the city of Houston as a whole. Only 6% of Greenspoint residents had a bachelor's degree or higher in 2012, compared with 29% of Houston residents. Conversely, 45% of Greenspoint residents have no high school diploma, compared with only 25% of Houstonians overall.

== History ==
Suburban development first arrived in the area with the construction of Greenspoint Mall by development firm Federated Stores Realty in 1976. By contemporary standards, the 1.2-million-square-foot (110,000 m^{2}) mall was state-of-the-art, with the interior designed to mimic an urban streetscape with extensive natural lighting and organic landscaping. Early tenants included Foley's, Montgomery Ward, and Lord & Taylor.

The arrival of the mall and its modern suburban amenities catalyzed a wave of development on the greenfield land surrounding it. In 1978, Friendswood Development Company, a subsidiary of oil giant Exxon, purchased hundreds of acres around the mall for the construction of what the Texas Observer described as a "world-class suburban business district, a hub for the corporate jet set." The master plan included 5,000 apartment units and eight interconnected office towers.

The onset of the 1980s oil glut in the middle of the decade harshly affected Exxon, which cut its workforce by 40%. Greenspoint, faced with a glut of residential and commercial development, quickly lost its luxury appeal and price point. Greenspoint Mall became the apex of a growing crime problem, and by the middle of the decade, motor vehicle theft was endemic to its large surface parking lot. Crime problems in the Mall climaxed with the abduction and murder of Harris County Sheriff's deputy Roxyann Allee at the mall in 1991. After frequent robberies in the parking lot and the infamous murder of deputy Roxyann Allee the mall was nicknamed "Gunspoint." In 1998, Goldman Sachs purchased 24 Greenspoint-area apartment complexes, totaling 3.8 million square feet (350,000 square metres) of rentable space, for over $130 million. 15 of those complexes were extensively renovated and merged into a large development known as "CityView", designed to appeal to higher-income young professionals.

Since 2000, Greenspoint has suffered from multiple catastrophic flooding events, largely due to the presence of multiple high-density apartment complexes within the floodplain of Greens Bayou. The bayou overtopped its banks in 2001 (Tropical Storm Allison), 2002, 2003, 2016 ("Tax Day" floods), and 2017 (Hurricane Harvey).

After Hurricane Katrina struck New Orleans, Louisiana in 2005, large groups of evacuees settled into apartment complexes in the area.

In 2017, Greenspoint Mall entered into a contract for sale to an international investment group which seeks to replace the ailing complex with mixed-use development.

By 2020 Amazon had established a warehouse in Greenspoint. R.A. Schuetz of the Houston Chronicle stated that a "revival" in Greenspoint was occurring. In 2019 Florian Martin of Houston Public Media reported that year that the "Gunspoint" nickname was still in use and that despite an increase in development and a decline in the crime rate, that "It’s Not Quite Houston’s New Hotspot Just Yet".

== Economy ==
Following the completion of a comprehensive new corporate campus in Spring, ExxonMobil withdrew completely from Greenspoint, abandoning approximately 2 million square feet (190,000 m^{2}) of office space during the mid-2010s. This move severely impacted the area's office market, which saw its office occupancy rate plummet to 60% in 2015, making it the worst-performing office submarket in Greater Houston. Prior to its move, ExxonMobil had consolidated a variety of departments into the district, including computer operations and exploration. The corporation's investment in Greenspoint had been so substantial that it was responsible for the construction of an entire eight-story office building, Greenspoint Eight, in the mid-1990s. ExxonMobil's presence expanded further in the 2000s, when it leased additional space and spent millions of dollars on infrastructure improvements.

=== Corporate operations ===
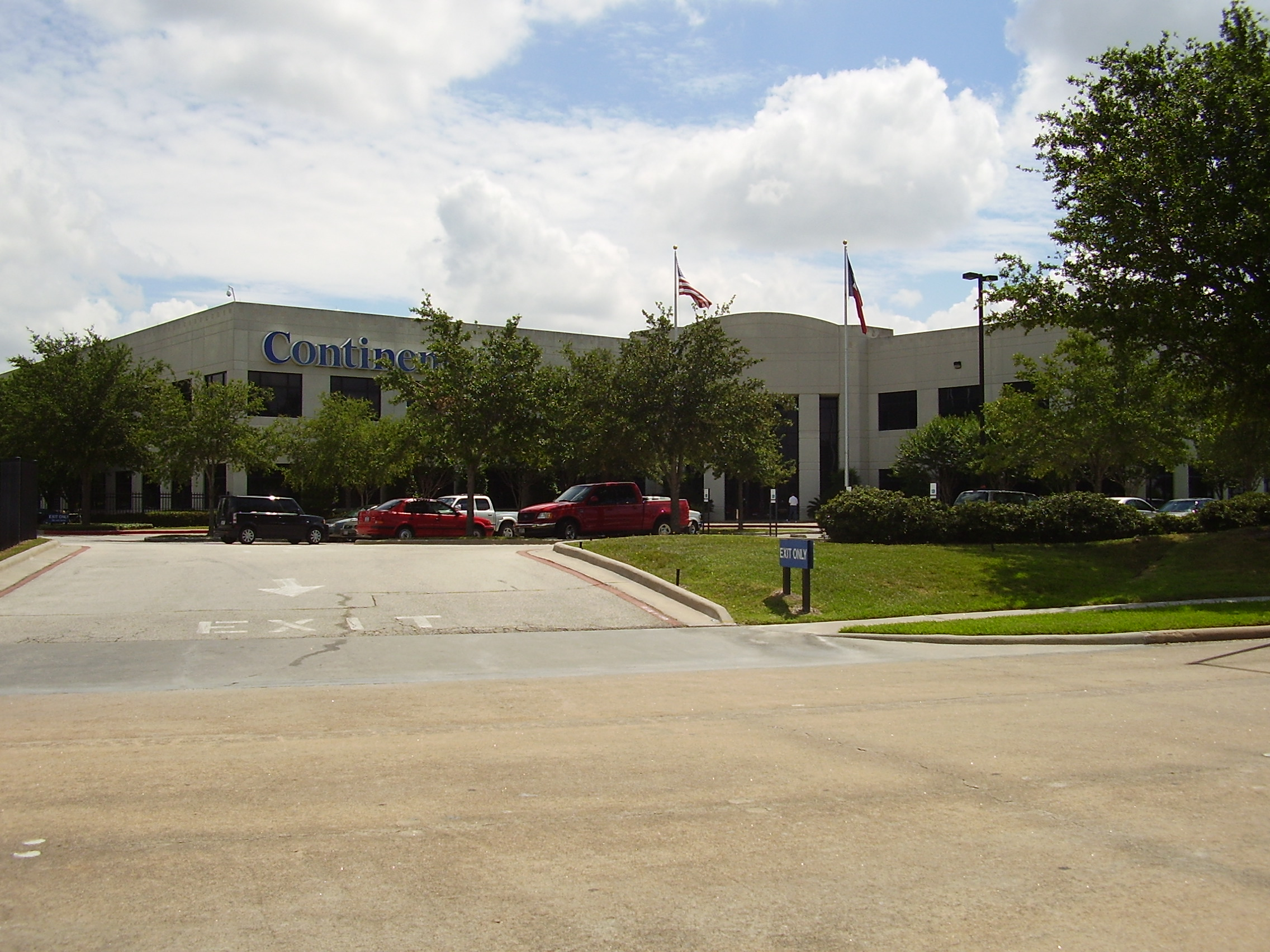
United Airline's North Houston Center

Greenspoint contains the headquarters of the following companies:

- Canrig Drilling Technologies
- Friendswood Development Company

Additionally, these corporations have major operations in Greenspoint:

- Nabors Industries
- Saudia
- Servisair
- Aetna

=== Former operations ===
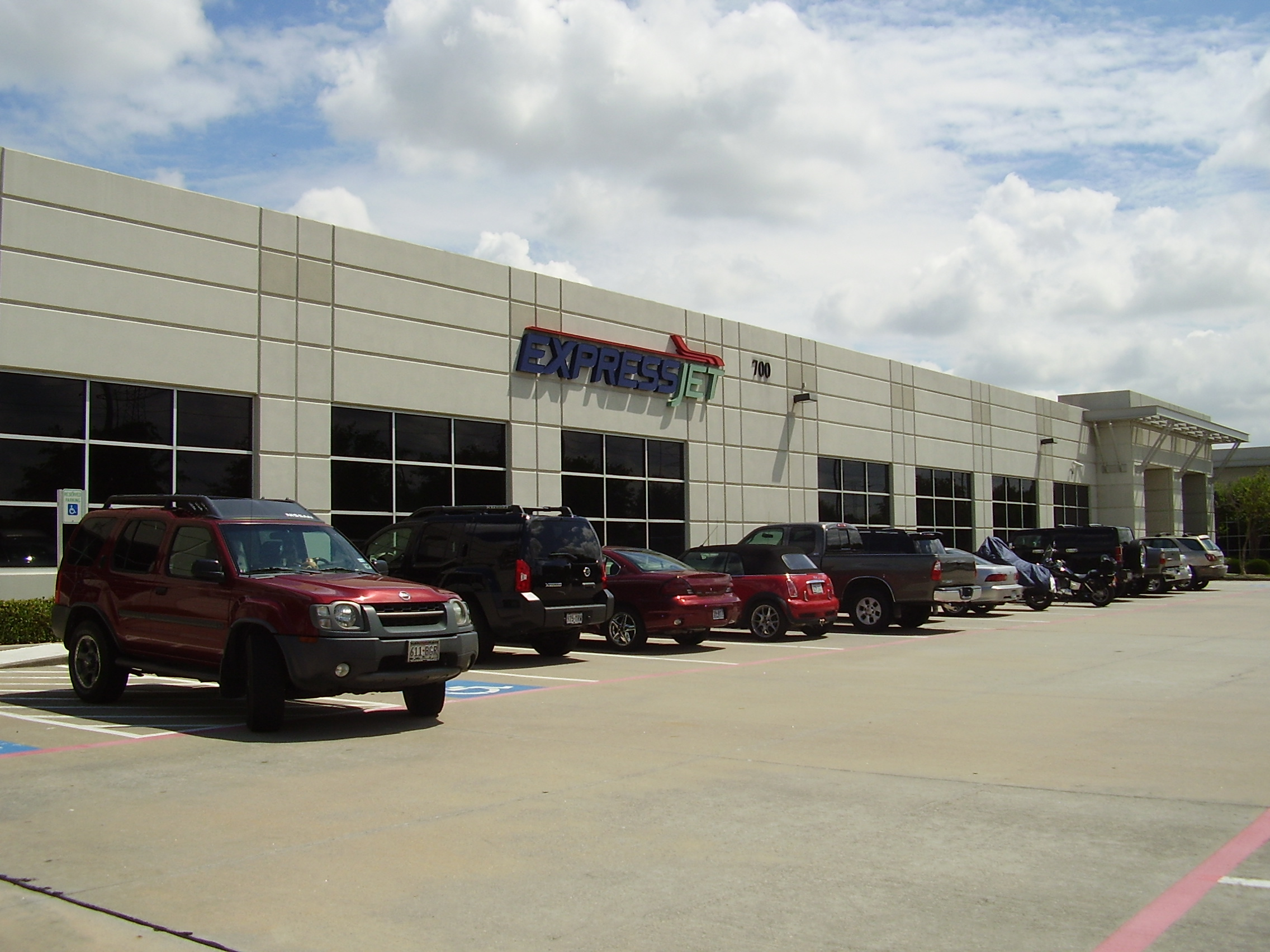
Former ExpressJet Airlines headquarters

- ASP Westward
- ExpressJet Airlines was headquartered in Greenspoint and in Houston.

Anadarko Petroleum was headquartered in the Anadarko Tower. Around 2002, Anadarko moved to The Woodlands, Texas, Montgomery County.

At one time the headquarters of Atofina (now Total Petrochemicals USA) were in an area in Houston in proximity to George Bush Intercontinental Airport and in proximity to the Greenspoint district. The lease to the former space was scheduled to expire in 2010, but the company had the right to cancel its lease in 2007. The firm, which occupied a similar amount of square footage in the previous office that it has in its current office, planned to sublease the space from 2005 to 2007.

=== Tax exemptions ===
Due to efforts from the North Houston Greenspoint Chamber of Commerce, in May 2003 the Aldine Independent School District (AISD) ratified approval of the freeport tax exemptions, which waive ad valorem property taxes on types of business inventory. 150 of the 5,000 companies operating in the Greenspoint area qualified for freeport tax exemptions. The chamber asked the school district to exempt the taxes because neighboring school districts had adopted the exemption and put the territory in AISD in a competitive disadvantage. As of 2003 the portions of Greenspoint covered by the City of Houston are under a freeport tax exemption from the city government, while the areas of Greenspoint in unincorporated areas do not have that exemption.

== Government and infrastructure ==
=== Local government and special districts ===
Greater Greenspoint straddles the city limits of Houston, with portions lying in unincorporated Harris County. Since Greenspoint is not an incorporated area, it does not have fixed geographic boundaries.

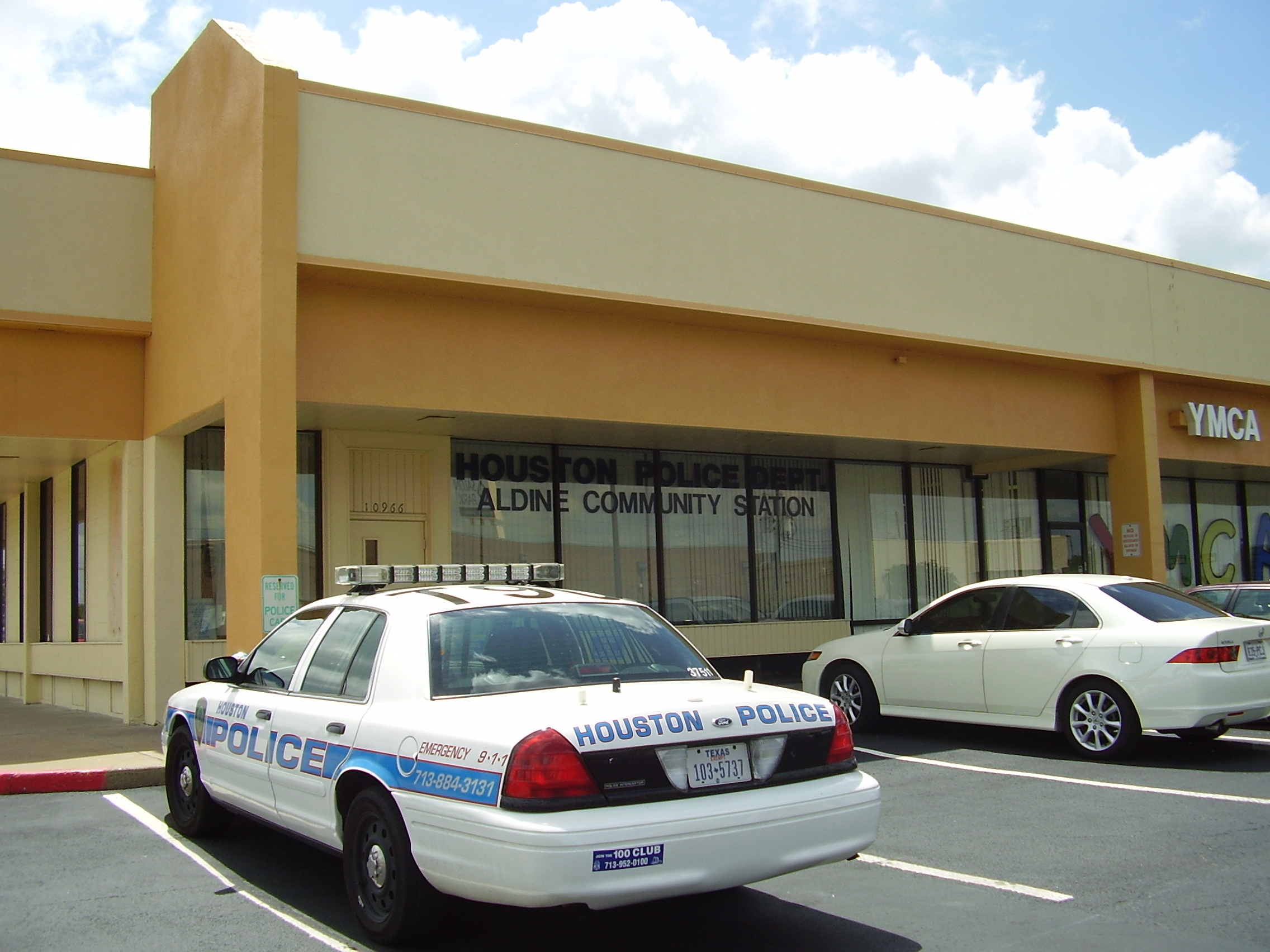
Former Aldine Storefront of the Houston Police Department

The portion of Greenspoint within Houston is part of Houston City Council district B. The Houston Police Department (HPD) serves the Houston portions of Greenspoint from the North Belt Police Station. The station, in a temporary office building location was of 2020, opened in January 2018. HPD previously served it as part of the North Patrol Division, While Greenspoint was a part of the North District, HPD operated two "storefronts" – small police stations located in retail centers – in the area: Aldine Storefront along Interstate 45 near Airline Drive and Greenspoint Storefront on the grounds of Greenspoint Mall.

Greenspoint is serviced by a special management district, the North Houston District, which was created by the Texas Legislature in 1991 to fund infrastructure, public safety, branding, and planning initiatives. The district levies its own special ad valorem commercial property tax on parcels within its boundaries to fund these improvements. The entity was known as the Greenspoint District until 2016, when it was rebranded.

The N. Houston Development Corp, formerly Greater Greenspoint Redevelopment Authority (GGRA), which oversees the Greenspoint Tax Increment Reinvestment Zone (TIRZ), is a separate entity from the District. TIRZs, which are created by the City of Houston (as opposed to the Texas Legislature), use tax increment financing to fund infrastructure and economic development projects within their boundaries. While the North Houston District and the GGRA often cooperate to create, manage, and fund infrastructure projects, they are distinct legal entities with different geographic boundaries.

The Houston Fire Department operates Station 74 Greenspoint, located in Fire District 64. The station at Airline and Goodson was built in 1979; the location was shared with the Little York Volunteer Fire Department. The current Station 74, located at Aldine Bender at Lillja, was built in 1983.

=== Federal and state representation ===
The United States Postal Service operates the Greens North Post Office at 1530 Greensmark Drive.

The U.S. Citizenship and Immigration Services Houston Field Office and the Houston office of the U.S. Immigration and Customs Enforcement are in Greenspoint and in Houston.

== Education ==
=== Community colleges ===
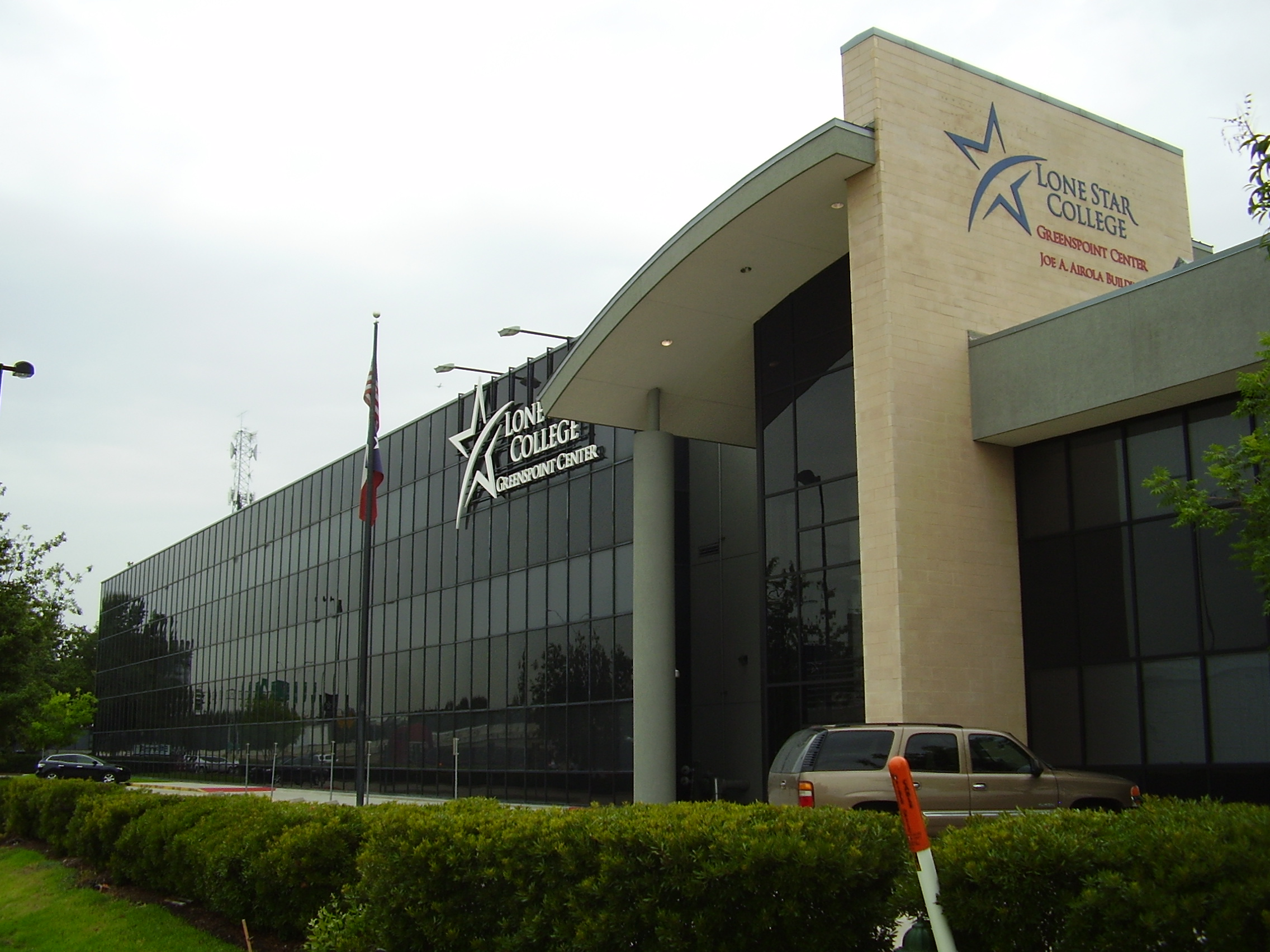
Lone Star College-Houston North Greenspoint Center

Lone Star College-Houston North (part of the Lone Star College System), is located along Beltway 8; it is on the south side of Beltway 8 while Greenspoint Mall is on the north side. The center was previously the administrative headquarters of the Lone Star College system, before it moved to The Woodlands. Lone Star College-North Harris also serves much of the area.

=== Primary and secondary schools ===
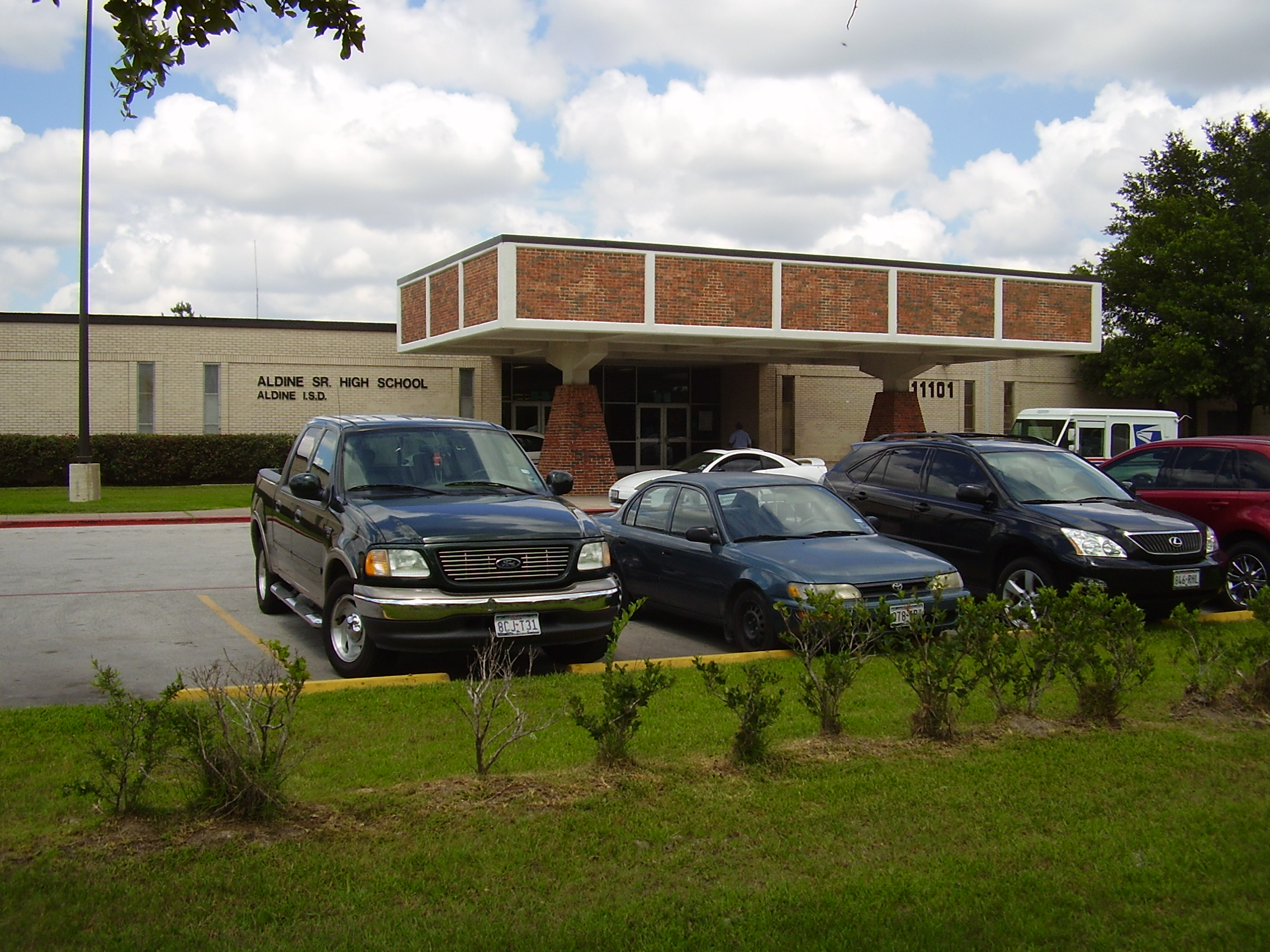
Aldine High School

Most students living in Greenspoint are zoned to the Aldine Independent School District; however, some are zoned to the Spring Independent School District.

==== Aldine Independent School District ====
Aldine ISD serves much of the area.

PreK schools serving sections of Greenspoint include deSantiago, Griggs, Hinojosa (in Aldine), Keeble, and Magrill.

Elementary schools serving sections of Greenspoint include Greenspoint (in Greenspoint), Black, Bussey (in Greenspoint), Calvert, Eckert, Gray (in Greenspoint), Marcella (in Greenspoint), Spence (in Greenspoint), Stehlik (in Greenspoint), and Thompson. Marcella and Stehlik were previously grade 5-6 intermediate schools.

Middle schools serving Greenspoint include Stovall (in Greenspoint), Lewis, Plummer, and Teague.

Aldine High School and Benjamin O. Davis High School are located in Greenspoint and serve portions of the district. Nimitz High School serves a small section. When Davis High School opened in 2012, a portion of Greenspoint was rezoned to that school.

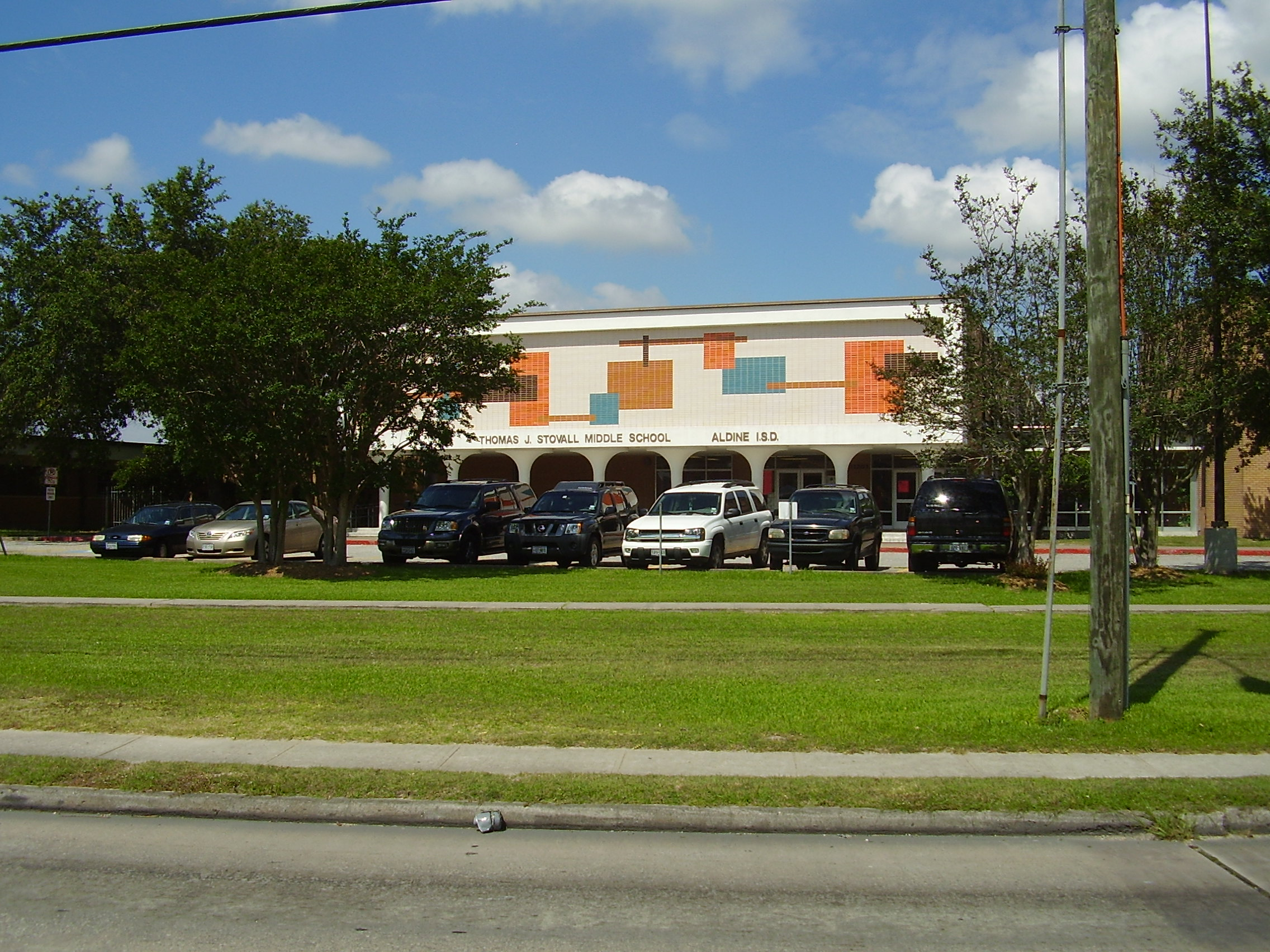
Thomas J. Stovall Middle School in Greenspoint

==== Spring Independent School District ====
None of the Spring ISD schools serving Greenspoint are in Greenspoint. Clark Primary and Clark Intermediate School, in an unincorporated area, serve one portion of Greenspoint for elementary school. Heritage Elementary School, in an unincorporated area, serves another. The SISD portion is also zoned to Wells Middle School and Dekaney High School, both in unincorporated areas.

=== Public libraries ===
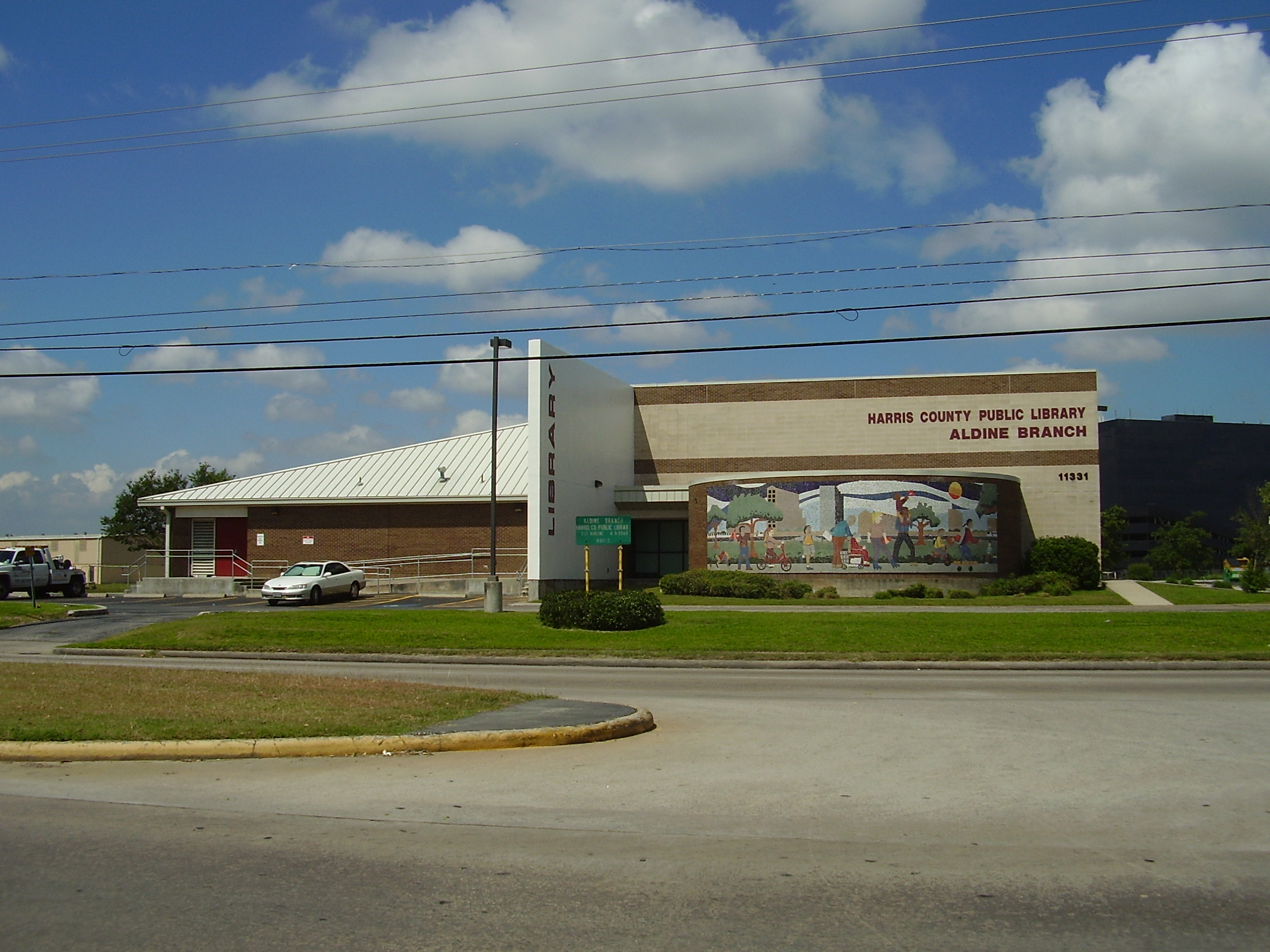
Aldine Branch

The Harris County Public Library Aldine Branch, located at 11331 Airline Drive in Greenspoint and in Houston, serves the community. The 13,268-square-foot (1,232.6 m^{2}) branch opened in 1976. The renovated Aldine Branch reopened on September 6, 2001. The expansion and renovation was originally scheduled to be completed in January 2001. Due to the expansion, the library gained 6,000 square feet (560 m^{2}), which led to increases in meeting spaces and a 100% increase in the number of computers. Students from Aldine High School, Aldine 9th Grade School, Stovall Middle School, and Black Elementary School use the branch.

== Gallery ==
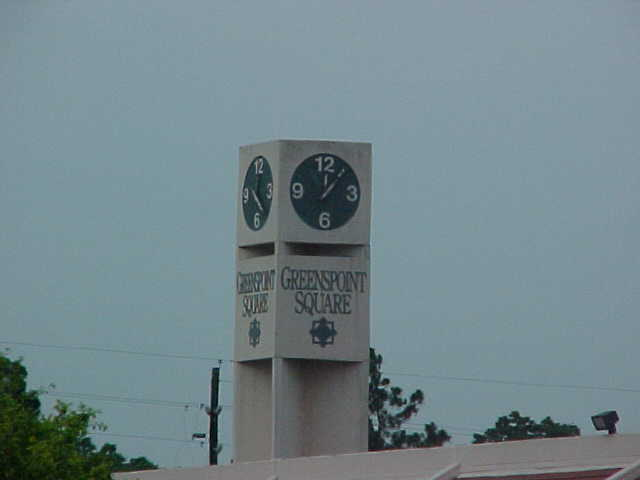

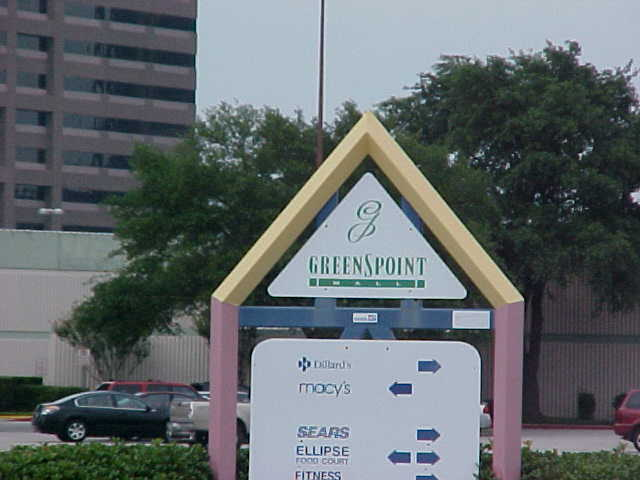

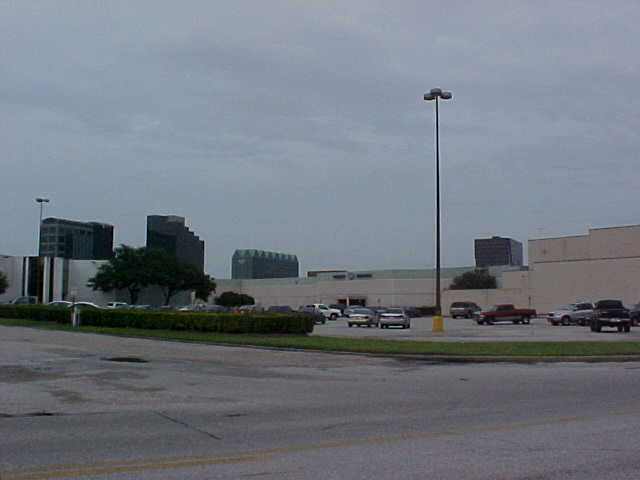

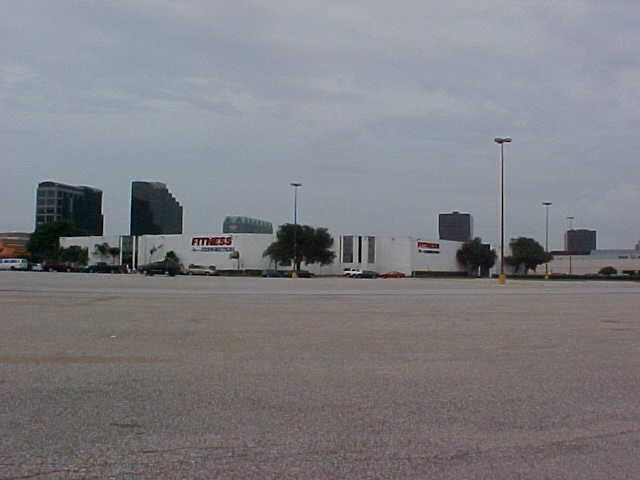

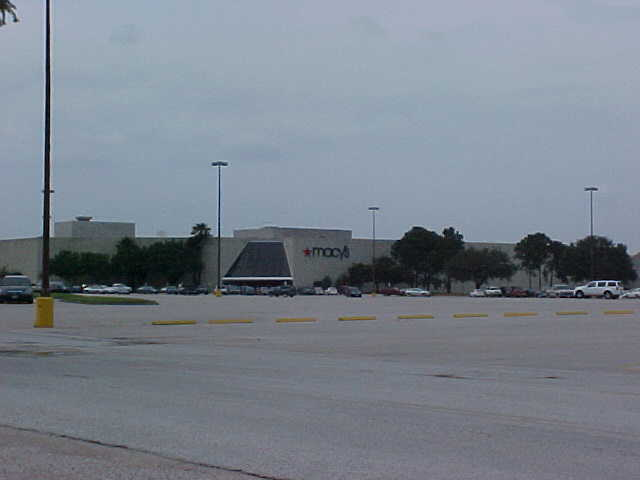

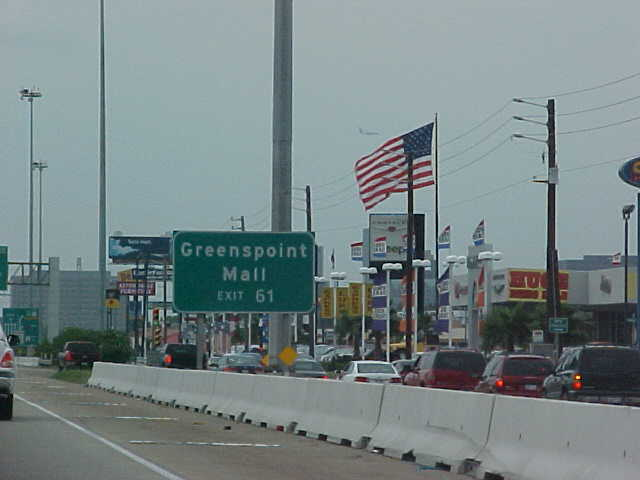

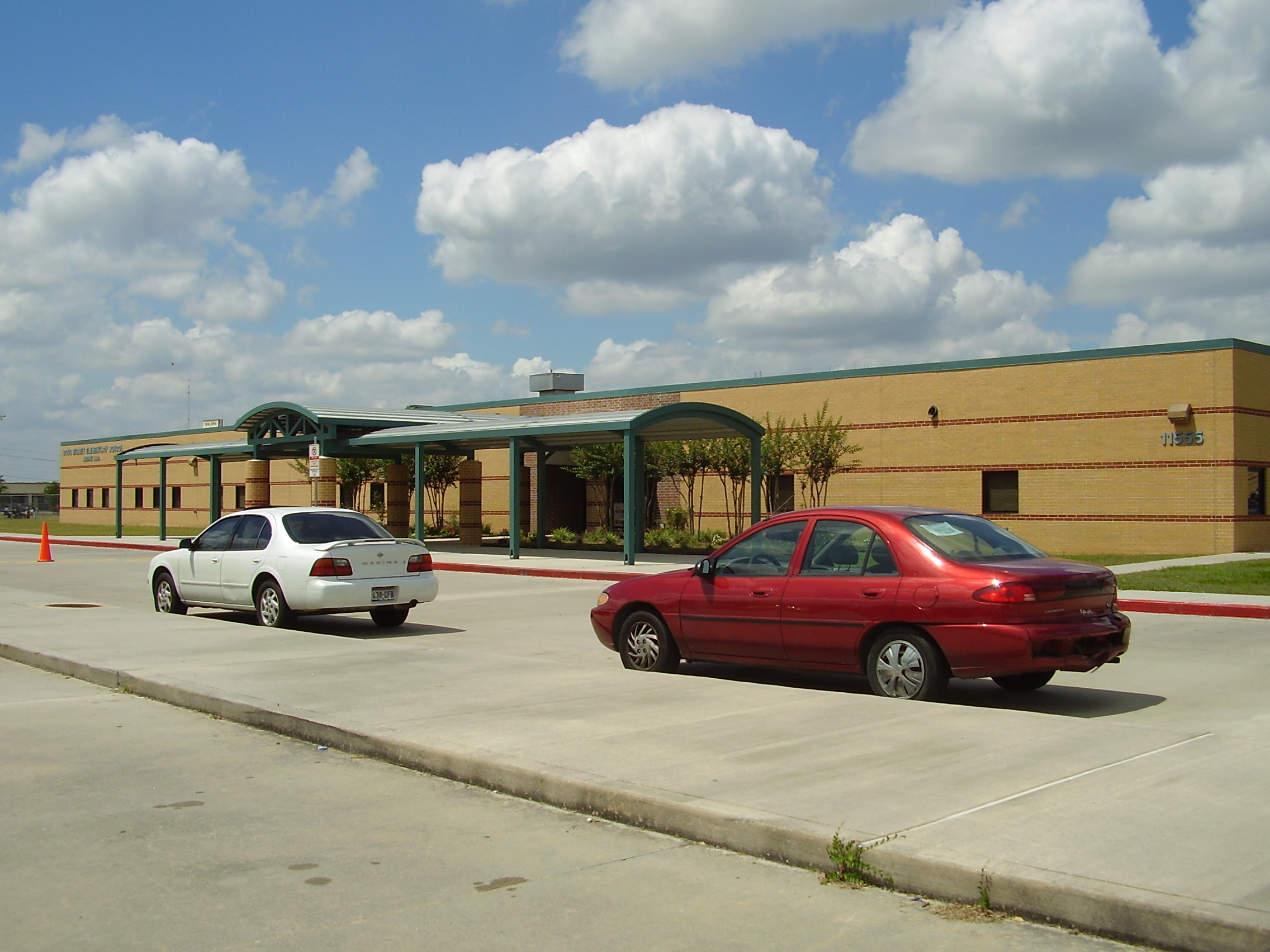
Bussey Elementary School

== See also ==
- Greenspoint Mall
