= SV Cynthia Woods =

Sailing yacht in Texas

- A photo of the crew of the S.V. Cynthia Woods before their 2008 departure for the Regata de Amigos in Mexico.
- Other names: Cape Fear 38
- Yacht club: Texas A&M University at Galveston
- Nation: (United States)
- Designer(s): Nelson/Marek Yacht Design, Inc.
- Builder: Cape Fear Yacht Work; Navassa, North Carolina
- Launched: 2006
- Owner(s): Texas A&M University - Galveston
- Fate: Capsized June 6, 2008 in the Gulf of Mexico killing 1 crew member, the safety officer on board.

Specifications
- Type: Sloop ~ Fin Keel with Bulb
- Displacement: 11,800 lb (5,400 kg)
- Length: 38 ft (12 m)
- Beam: 11 ft (3.4 m)
- Draft: 6 ft (1.8 m)
- Mast height: 48 ft (15 m)
- Sail area: 800 sq ft (74 m^{2})
- Crew: Roger Stone; Steven Conway; Ross Busby; Steven Guy; Joe Savana; Travis Wright

The SV Cynthia Woods was a sailing vessel owned by Texas A&M University at Galveston (TAMUG) and used by The TAMUG Sailing Team. It was manufactured in 2005 and donated to TAMUG by George P. Mitchell. The Cynthia Woods was named for his wife Cynthia Woods Mitchell.

== 2008 vessel capsize in Gulf of Mexico ==
On June 6, 2008, the Cynthia Woods set sail in the Regatta de Amigos with a 6-person crew consisting of the captain (a university employee), along with four sailing team members (TAMUG students), and one safety officer who was a volunteer. The sailing yacht commenced the sailboat race in Galveston, Texas at 2:00p.m. local time. The Cape Fear 38 was destined for a 638 nautical miles (1,182 km; 734 mi) salt water sailing cruise along the Gulf of Mexico coast to Veracruz, Mexico with the Regatta Amigos occurring at the Isla Mujeres island.

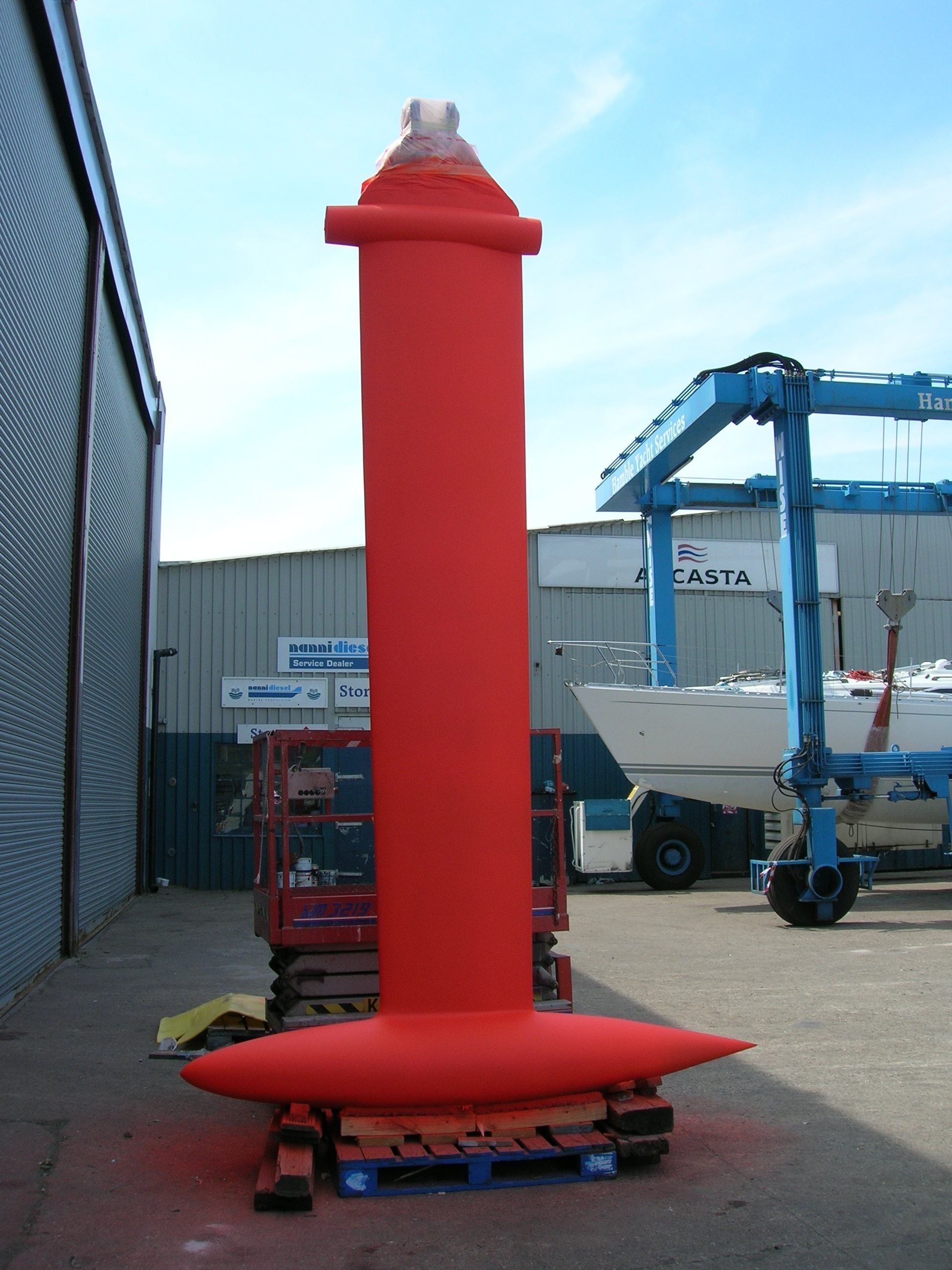
Sailboat keel with cigar-shaped fin bulb

The Cape Fear monohull is believed to have lost its 6 feet (1.8 m) bulb keel jeopardized by a fluctuating sea state in the night. The Northern Hemisphere subtropical zone was mercurial with severe weather during the 2008 Atlantic hurricane season. The Gulf of Mexico tropical storm interval encompassed Tropical Storm Alma and Tropical Storm Arthur by late May and early June 2008. The tropical cyclogenesis developed along the east and west coasts of Central America while combining the Yucatán Channel of the Caribbean Sea.

The Cape Fear 38 was equipped with two search and rescue transponders: a main one attached to the boat and a portable one provided by race officials for monitoring. The main transponder stopped working around midnight on June 6 and the portable stopped working around 9:00 a.m. the next morning. The crew missed their scheduled 8:00 a.m. check-in call on June 7.

Safety officer Roger Stone woke the crew in the lower deckhouse alerting the squad of the boat consuming seawater before Mr. Stone became displaced in the marginal sea. A sailboat matching the description of the missing Cape Fear 38 feet (12 m) monohull was spotted in a capsized state by a Coast Guard aircraft at 5:15 p.m. on June 8, 2008. The navigational crew orderly escaped the turtling sloop while staying afloat using four personal flotation devices in four-to-six-foot seas for 26 hours before being found by the United States Coast Guard air-sea rescue and subsequently culled from the Gulf of Mexico waters. The survivors were lifted to safety by helicopter at around 1:00 a.m. on June 8 and flown to a hospital in Galveston for treatment.

== See also ==
- Racer's hurricane
