= The Houmas =

Historic house in Louisiana, United States

- U.S. National Register of Historic Places
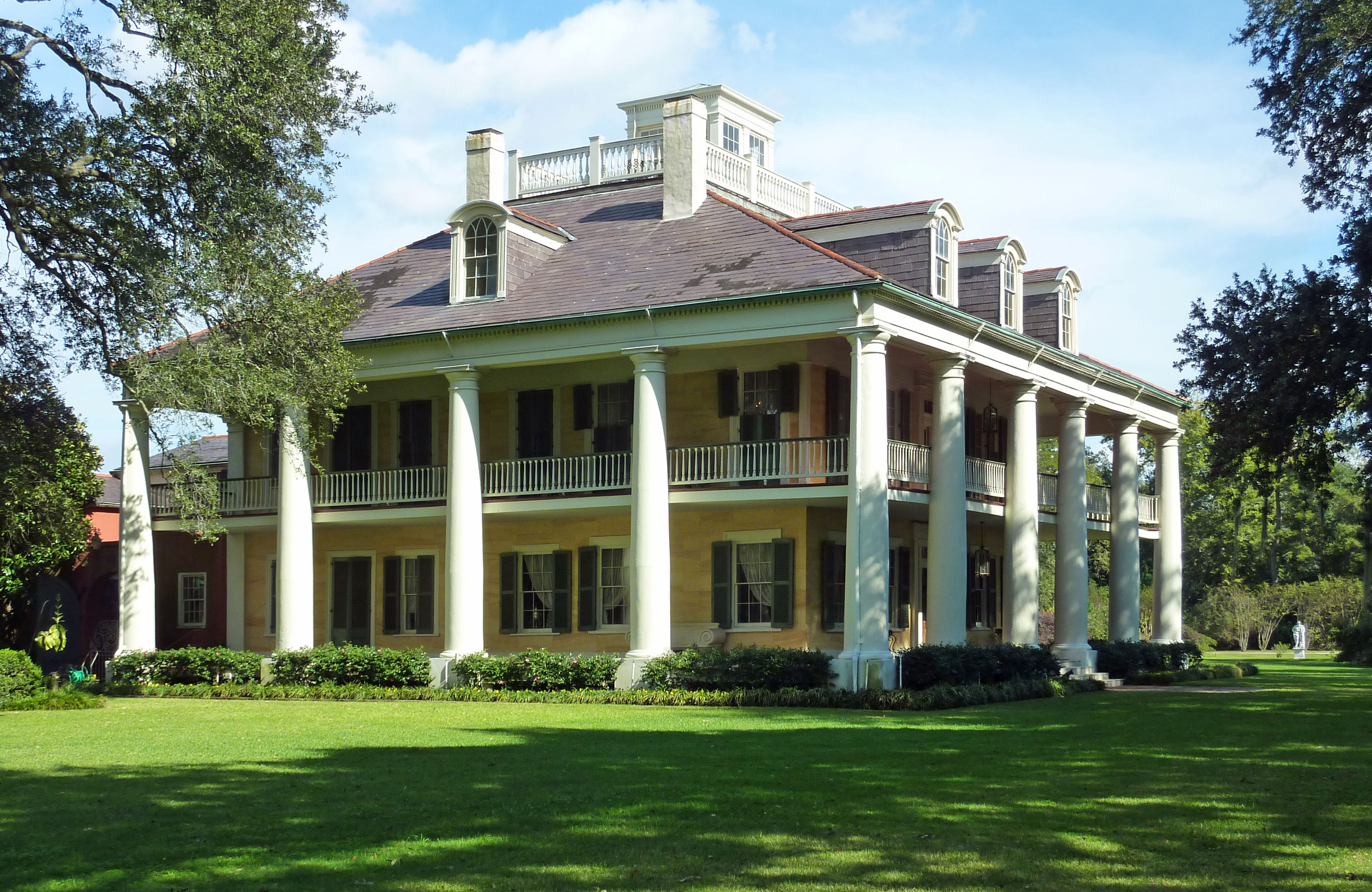
- The main house in 2010

- Location within Louisiana Location within the United States
- Location: West of Burnside, about 0.63 miles (1.01 km) west of intersection of River Road and Louisiana Highway 44
- Nearest city: Burnside, Louisiana
- Coordinates: 30°08′28″N 90°56′03″W
- Area: 10 acres (4.0 ha)
- Built: 1840
- Built by: John Smith Preston
- Architectural style: Federal, Greek Revival
- NRHP reference No.: 80001694
- Added to NRHP: September 27, 1980

The Houmas, also known as Burnside Plantation and currently known as Houmas House Plantation and Gardens, is a historic plantation complex and house museum in Burnside, Louisiana. The plantation was established in the late 1700s, with the current main house completed in 1840. It was named after the native Houma people, who originally occupied this area of Louisiana.

The complex, containing eight buildings and one structure, and the 10 acres (4.0 ha) they rest upon, was added to the National Register of Historic Places on September 27, 1980.

== History ==
The Houmas plantation had its beginnings when Alexander Latil and Maurice Conway appropriated all of the Houma tribe's land on the east side of the Mississippi River in 1774. Alexander Latil built a French Colonial style plantation house at the site around 1775.

It was a working sugarcane plantation by 1803, when the United States obtained the area through the Louisiana Purchase. Shortly afterwards The Houmas was purchased by Daniel Clark, who began to develop the property and built one of the first sugar mills along this stretch of the river. In June 1807, Clark and territorial Governor William C. C. Claiborne fought a duel on the property, in which Claiborne sustained a gunshot wound to his leg.

In 1811, former American Revolutionary War general Wade Hampton purchased Daniel Clark's land holdings and slaves. Hampton was one of the wealthiest landowners and largest slaveholders in the antebellum era South.

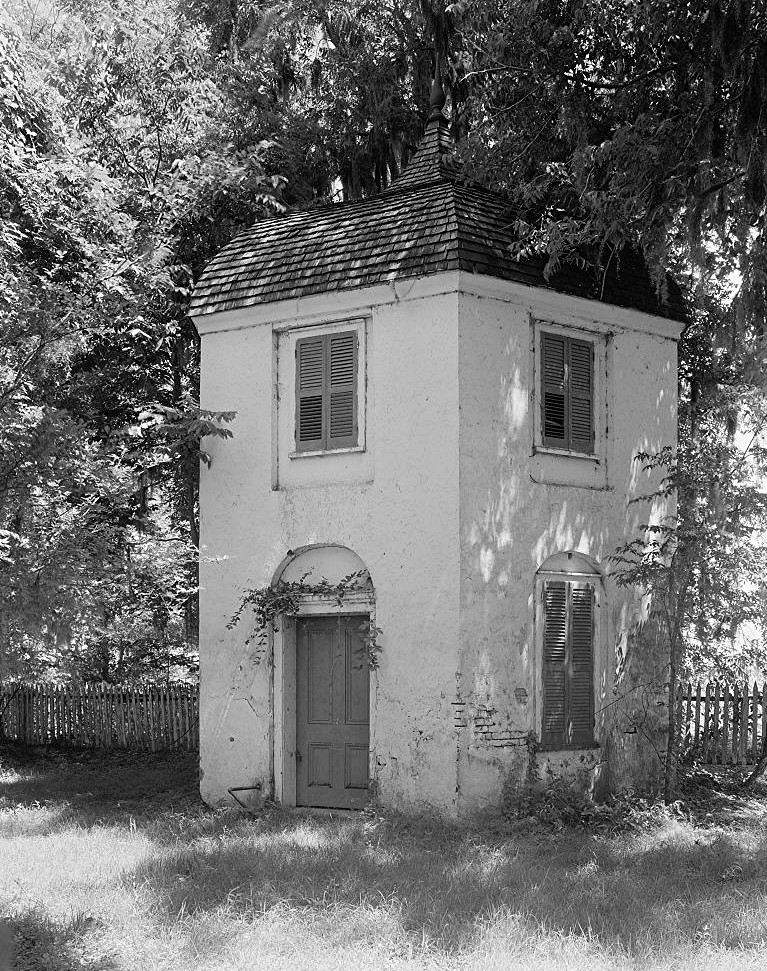
A garçonnière at The Houmas

The earliest surviving building is the original main house. Its construction date is the source of contention among scholarly sources, with some believing it is the original Latil house, with later alterations. Others point to evidence that it is from the Wade Hampton era. It is a Federal style two-story, brick building with end wall gables and chimneys and a stuccoed exterior. It has two rooms on each floor with a central hall and staircase and is linked to the later main house by a carriageway.

Management of the property was taken over by John Smith Preston about 1825. Preston was married to Caroline Hampton, Wade Hampton's daughter. The Prestons built a new main house in front of the old one in 1840. The Greek Revival mansion is two-and-a-half stories high and surrounded by 14 monumental Doric columns on three sides. The hipped roof is crowned with arched dormer windows and a belvedere. Additional structures from this period include matching brick octagonal garçonnières, or bachelors' quarters. They are two-stories, with a sitting room on the first floor and a bedroom on the second. There are also numerous other brick service structures adjacent to the house.

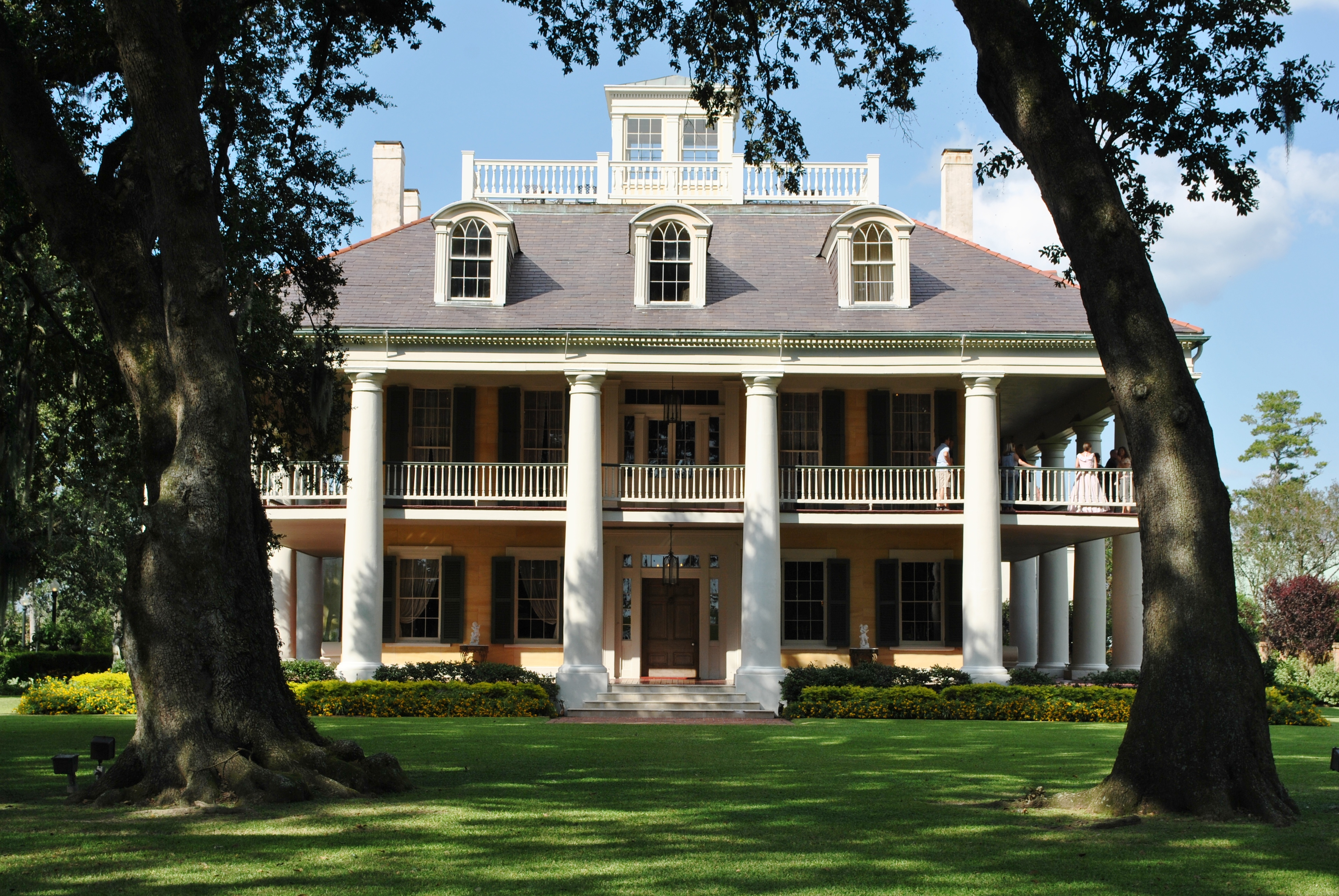
Front façade viewed from the oak tree alley

The more than 10,000-acre (4,000 ha) estate was sold to John Burnside, a native of Belfast, Ireland, in 1857. Burnside had increased the acreage to 12,000 acres (4,900 ha) within the span of a few years and built four sugar mills to process his crop. With approx 750 slaves on it and Burnside's many surrounding plantations, it was the center of the largest slave holding in Louisiana prior to the American Civil War.

During the war, plans were made to use the plantation house as a headquarters for Union general Benjamin Franklin Butler, who governed New Orleans for about seven months following the city's capture in May 1862. Burnside, still a citizen of the United Kingdom of Great Britain and Ireland, reputedly prevented this by suggesting that international complications would arise if his estate was seized by Federal authorities.

A lifelong bachelor, John Burnside died in 1881 and left the estate to a friend, Oliver Beirne. It then went to William Porcher Miles, Beirne's son-in-law. Following the death of Miles in 1899, the property began to be divided up and the house began to fall into disrepair. The Mississippi River flood in 1927 and the Great Depression further endangered the property.

The house and what was left of the property was finally purchased by Dr. George B. Crozat in 1940. Crozat began an ambitious program of restoration of the house and gardens. In the process he stripped off some of the original decorative elements of the interior and exterior to give the house a simpler, "Federal style," look. The house and grounds remained in that family until it passed to a new owner, Kevin Kelly, in 2003.

== Filming location ==
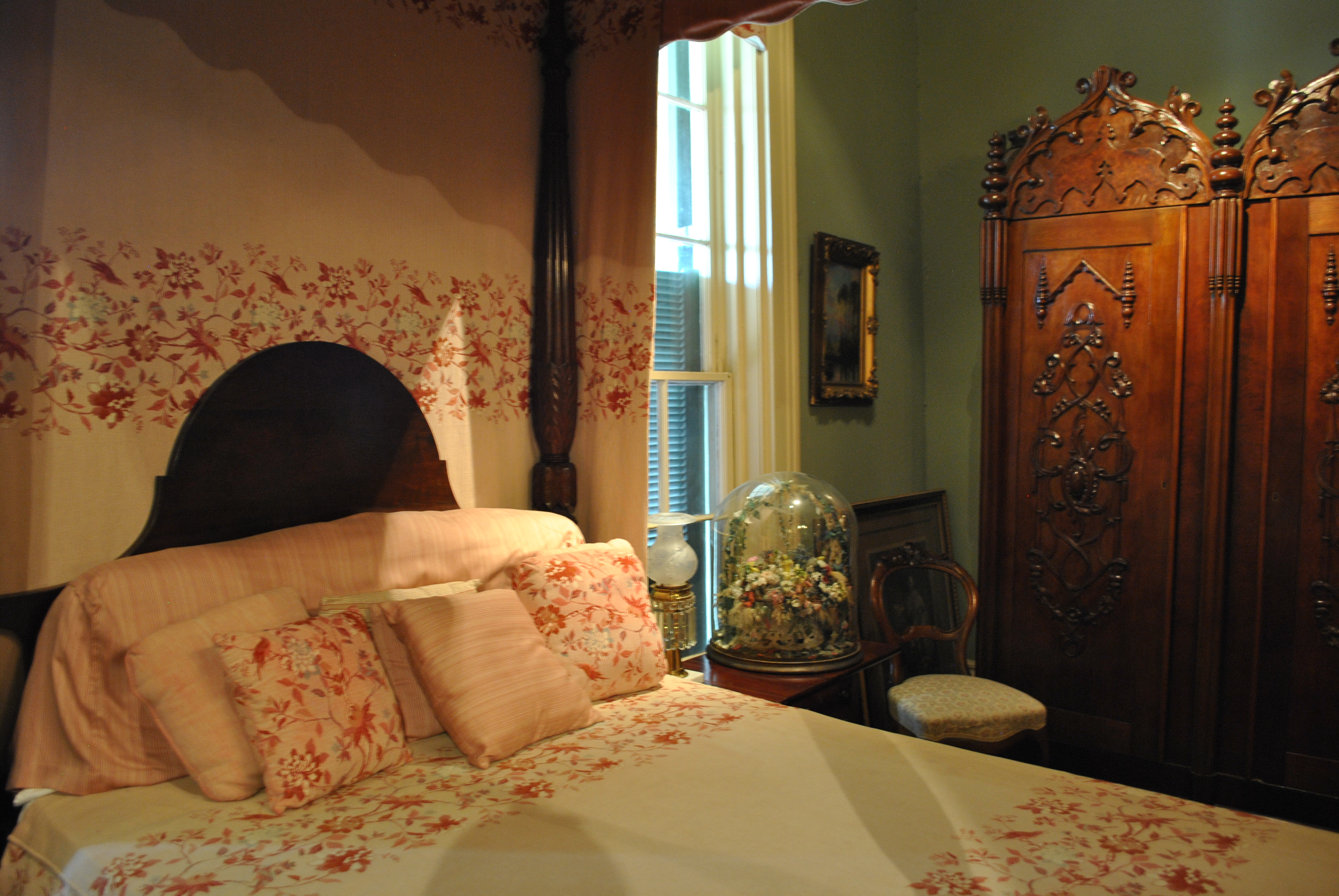
Room occupied by Bette Davis while shooting Hush… Hush, Sweet Charlotte

The Houmas has been the filming location for a variety of motion pictures, television series and commercials. Houmas House is most associated with the Bette Davis movie Hush… Hush, Sweet Charlotte (1964), in which the house has a Tara-like presence.

Other films shot in part at The Houmas include Mandingo (1975), Fletch Lives (1988), and Love, Wedding, Marriage (2011). Television films and series include Moon of the Wolf (1972), A Woman Called Moses (1976), Big Bob Johnson and His Fantastic Speed Circus (1978), All My Children (1981), A Taste of Louisiana with Chef John Folse and Company (one episode, 1990), Snow Wonder (2006), K-Ville (2007), Top Chef (one episode, 2009), Midnight Bayou (2009), Revenge of the Bridesmaids (2010), Wheel of Fortune (one episode, 2011), and The Bachelor (one episode, 2017). Commercials have been shot at the plantation for Budweiser, Virginia Slims, Best Buy, Hibernia National Bank, and the Louisiana Office of Tourism.

== Legacy ==
=== The Antebellum ===
Houmas was the inspiration for The Antebellum, an 8,212 sqft estate and gardens in Grogan's Point. It is one of six historically inspired estates developed by the Westbrook Building Company in 1988. In-kind, The Antebellum inspired three additional plantation estates in East Shore of The Woodlands.

== See also ==
- National Register of Historic Places listings in Ascension Parish, Louisiana
- List of plantations in Louisiana
- History of slavery in Louisiana
