= Niche real estate =

Specialized sector of the property market

Niche real estate refers to specialized sectors of the property market. Examples include income property, garden real estate, condos, equestrian property, vacation property, farm property, golf property, golf course redevelopment, waterfront homes, beach houses and luxury homes. These are categories in which potential buyers think about the property they seek. They are also used by real estate marketing companies to reach these types of buyers. In this context a niche describes a specific segment of home buyers and sellers, classified by ethnicity, nationality or socio-economic group (e.g., social housing or luxury real estate).

== Types ==
=== Garden real estate ===
Garden real estate includes properties with a significant garden design that contributes to the overall value of the property. These properties originate in three different ways: gardens that are designed by prominent landscapers, gardens that were designed by architects or professional landscapers, and gardens that were designed by the previous owner.

=== Golf properties ===
Golf properties include residential properties and communities surrounding golf courses. The value of these properties may increase by being near well-established golf courses.

=== Condominiums ===
Condominiums are individually-owned single housing units in a multi-unit building. Condominiums can be residential or commercial, such as office condominiums.
