= Grogan Cochran Lumber Company =

Grogan Cochran Lumber Company was an American lumber company founded in 1917 by George and Will Grogan at Grand Lake Switch, Texas.

In 1927, the company merged with the Lone Star Lumber Company in Magnolia, Texas. The company operated until 1960.

The Heritage Museum of Montgomery County, Texas is located in a building known as the Grogan-Cochran house.

Much of the area where the company cut down and sold trees has now become the planned community of The Woodlands, Texas.
