= Greenspoint Mall =

Defunct mall in Houston, Texas, U.S.

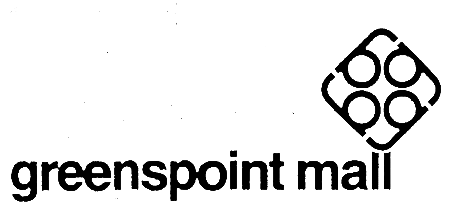

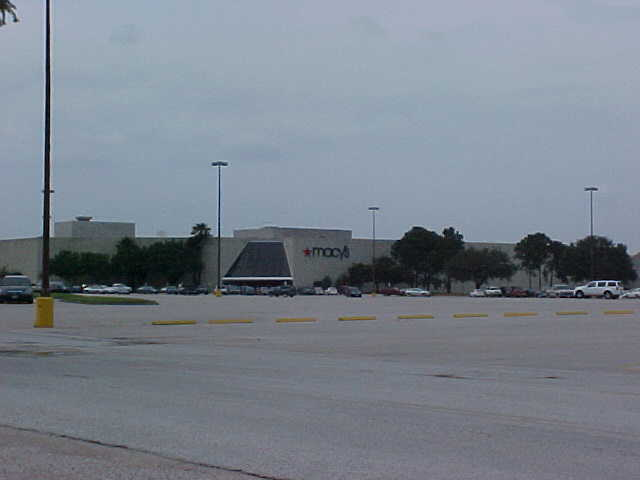
- The now vacant Macy's on the northwest side of the property; closed in 2017. Originally owned & operated by Foley's (1976-2006)
- Location: Greenspoint, Houston, Texas, United States
- Coordinates: 29°56′44″N 95°24′42″W
- Address: 12300 North Freeway
- Opened: July 4, 1976 (50 years ago)
- Closed: June 30, 2024
- Developer: Friendswood Development Company (Foley's)
- Num. of stores: 82 (at time of closing)
- Num. of anchor tenants: 7 (1 open, 5 vacant, 1 demolished)
- Floor area: 1,391,432 sq ft (129,300 m^{2})
- Floors: 1 (2 in former Dillard's, Lord & Taylor, Macy's, and Sears)
- Public transit: METRO Routes 6, 56, 85, 86, 99, 102, 399

Greenspoint Mall was a shopping mall located in the Greenspoint neighborhood of Houston, Texas, at the northeast corner of Interstate 45 and Beltway 8 (also known as the Sam Houston Parkway/Tollway). The mall was historically anchored by Macy's, Palais Royal, Dillard's, Sears, Premiere Cinemas, Lord & Taylor/Mervyn's, and Montgomery Ward.

== Construction and early years ==
In November 1974, plans for the mall were announced, initially under the name "Greensgate Mall". Greenspoint Mall celebrated its grand opening on August 5, 1976, anchored by Sears, Houston-based Palais-Royal, and Foley's, the latter of which was owned at the time by Federated Department Stores who developed the mall. The mall eventually expanded by the late 1970s to include Joske's, JCPenney, Montgomery Ward and Lord & Taylor. Revolving around a "Central Park" theme, complete with a sculpture court, Greenspoint was at one point the largest mall in Greater Houston before the Galleria's later expansions in the 1980s and 2000s. Prudential Property Co. planned a $7 million renovation in 1988.

Lord & Taylor sold its Greenspoint and its Memorial Mall anchor locations to Mervyn's in February 1989. Counting that anchor, Greenspoint Mall was 94% occupied in February 1989, making it the mall with the fourth highest percentage of occupied space in the Houston area.

== Decline ==
The opening of the Woodlands Mall in Fall of 1994 about 16 miles north of Greenspoint combined with rising vacancies caused by the expiry of non-renewed 20-year leases raised concerns about the Mall's long term financial future. Mervyn’s departed Greenspoint on January 16, 1998 as part of the company’s plan to close 10 under performing stores. General Cinema closed its Greenspoint Mall 5 theater a month later.

Dallas-based Archon was near a deal to purchase the mall in 1998, though a Los Angeles developer would unravel the deal when it entered negotiations to purchase the mall instead. Los Angeles developer Bob Yari of Day Properties would eventually purchase the 1,700,000-square-foot (160,000 m^{2}) mall from Prudential Real Estate Investments Separate Account, a pension fund investment group organized by Prudential Insurance Company of America. Yari sought to attract a multiscreen movie theater.

The mall became a part of a redevelopment project that same year. Office and convention center space, as well as a flea market were all being considered. Greenspoint would lose two more of its anchors when JCPenney closed in 1999 and Montgomery Ward closing a year later. As part of the redevelopment, the owners bought the closed Mervyn's and JCPenney locations in 2000.

In 2000, the mall was among the largest five Houston-area retail developments based on net rentable area.

Greenspoint Mall reached its 30th anniversary in 2006. Due to high crime rates in the area, the shopping center had been tagged with a nickname of "Gunspoint Mall." Facing 30-year lease expirations, the management of Greenspoint Mall announced a $32 million project to refurbish the 30-year-old mall into an hybridized open-air/enclosed shopping center called The Renaissance at Greenspoint, entailing the demolition of the vacant anchor stores for new outdoor amenities. That year, Macy's rebranded the Greenspoint Foley's anchor to a Macy's store as part of the chain's purchase of Federated Department Stores.

In November 2006, six months after the renovation was announced, Triyar Cos. LLC, owned by the Yari family, put the mall and several other Greater Houston malls for sale. Much of the Renaissance at Greenspoint was dropped with the exception without agreements other than Premiere Cinema's decision to build a multiscreen movie theater and GlennLock Sports Bar & Grill signing a lease.

== Final years, closure, and demolition ==
After the destruction of the vacated JCPenney in May 2010, a movie theater was built opening on the anchor pad, with a connection into the mall. Lacking the promised, unified refresh of Greenspoint Mall combined with high crime rates resulted in escalating vacancies. In May 2010, Sears announced that its store at Greenspoint Mall would close.

On January 4, 2017, Macy's announced that it would close its Greenspoint Mall anchor with a liquidation sale that ended March 27, 2017. Later that year when Hurricane Harvey hit Houston, displaced flood victims exceeded the capacity for shelter at the NRG Stadium; 259 people were relocated to the former Macy's anchor.

Under contract for purchase in 2017 by potential new owner, Global Plaza Union, rumors suggested that a plan to demolish the interior of the Greenspoint Mall was imminent. The plans did not develop and the Greenspoint Mall continued operations reaching greyfield status with vacancies surpassing occupancy. In 2019, anchors Dillard's and Palais Royal - both of which had rebranded their Greenspoint operations as clearance outlets - closed permanently.

Premiere Cinemas suspended operations along with theaters nationwide due to the COVID-19 restrictions that were implemented in March 2020. Though restrictions later in 2020 reopened many Houston theaters, Premiere announced the closure in Greenspoint would be permanent leaving the theater frozen in time, complete with the marquee and associated posters with movie titles from spring 2020.

The mall's interior closed temporarily for repairs in 2023 but reopened with a handful of stores operating with a seven day a week, 11am to 7pm schedule. The only open anchor was a Fitness Connection Gym housed in the former Mervyn's location.

On May 23, 2024 it was announced that the mall would be closed on June 30, 2024. Tenants were given until July 31, 2024 to move everything out, after which the mall would permanently shutter to tenants. There are plans for apartments and retail stores to take its place; however, these plans were shelved. Demolition of the site began October 2026.

== Future of site ==
The mall site will be redeveloped into an industrial park, set to open in 2028.
