= Farm land (real estate niche) =

Deals with the purchase and sale of Arable land

Farm land is a real estate niche that deals with the purchase and sale of Arable land. This niche requires the real estate agent to have very particular knowledge about the land and farming industry. A Real Estate agent or broker that specialises in farms must be knowledgeable in the following: City, County and State regulations of farms. The agent must be familiar with P&L statements for farms. Farm land can be very large: some farms are more than 100 acres.

The agent must be familiar with livestock farms and crop producing farms to determine the market value of the property.

Value of the property is determined with the expected return on investment of the farm business. Farm machinery are not often included as part of the transaction, as most farmland in the United States is leased out to a tenant farmer. There are several types of agreements with tenant farmers and landowners including 50/50 crop share, cash-rent least (price per tillable acre), and flex lease which is a combination of a cash-rent lease with a share in the yield profits should the farm be above a certain yield specified in the lease.

Farming transaction is complex and can often require history of yields, soil testing, and specific due diligence on mineral and air rights.

A state salesperson or brokers license is required to represent a seller or buyer.

Representing sellers or buyers as a broker is regulated by individual state statutes. Some state that a real estate salesperson or broker should have a minimum of 5 years experience working with an experience farm broker before soliciting for their own farm clients. However, the essential issues is if a person has competence in the area they are representing. For example, a commercial broker with experience in office buildings should probably not represent a buyer/seller in a farmland transaction if they do not have knowledge or experience in that type of real estate niche.
