= B. Greg Mitchell =

Brian Gregory Mitchell is a research biologist and senior lecturer working at the Scripps Institution of Oceanography, a department of the University of California, San Diego.

== Early life and education ==
Mitchell was born to billionaire Texas oilman and hydraulic fracturing pioneer George P. Mitchell and Cynthia Woods Mitchell. He attended St. John's School, and holds a B.S. degree from the University of Texas, Austin and a Ph.D. (1987) in biology from the University of Southern California.

== Research ==
His expertise is algae, including its possible use as a source of fuel. His research takes place in Antarctica and in the Arctic. Research interests include phytoplankton photosynthesis and growth models, aquatic ecology, ocean optics and satellite remote sensing, particularly the use of satellites to monitor change in global ocean ecosystems.

From 1990 to 1992 he was the chief scientist for the SeaWiFS (Sea-Viewing Wide Field-of-View Sensor) project by NASA. His most recent research is being tracked on NASA's What on Earth blog.
