= Heritage Museum of Montgomery County, Texas =

History museum in Texas, United States

Coordinates: 30°19′17″N 95°28′21″W

Heritage Museum of Montgomery County is a history museum in Conroe, Montgomery County, Texas, a mostly rural county northeast of Houston.

The museum includes exhibits on the origin of the current population of the county, including those drawn by the lumber and oil industries. It is located in the Grogan/Cochran home, built in 1924. The museum was opened by the Conroe Service League in 1985.

The museum has three permanent galleries:

- Glimpses of Montgomery County
- Towns, People and Events
- Hands-On Children's Room
