= Golf property =

Real estate term

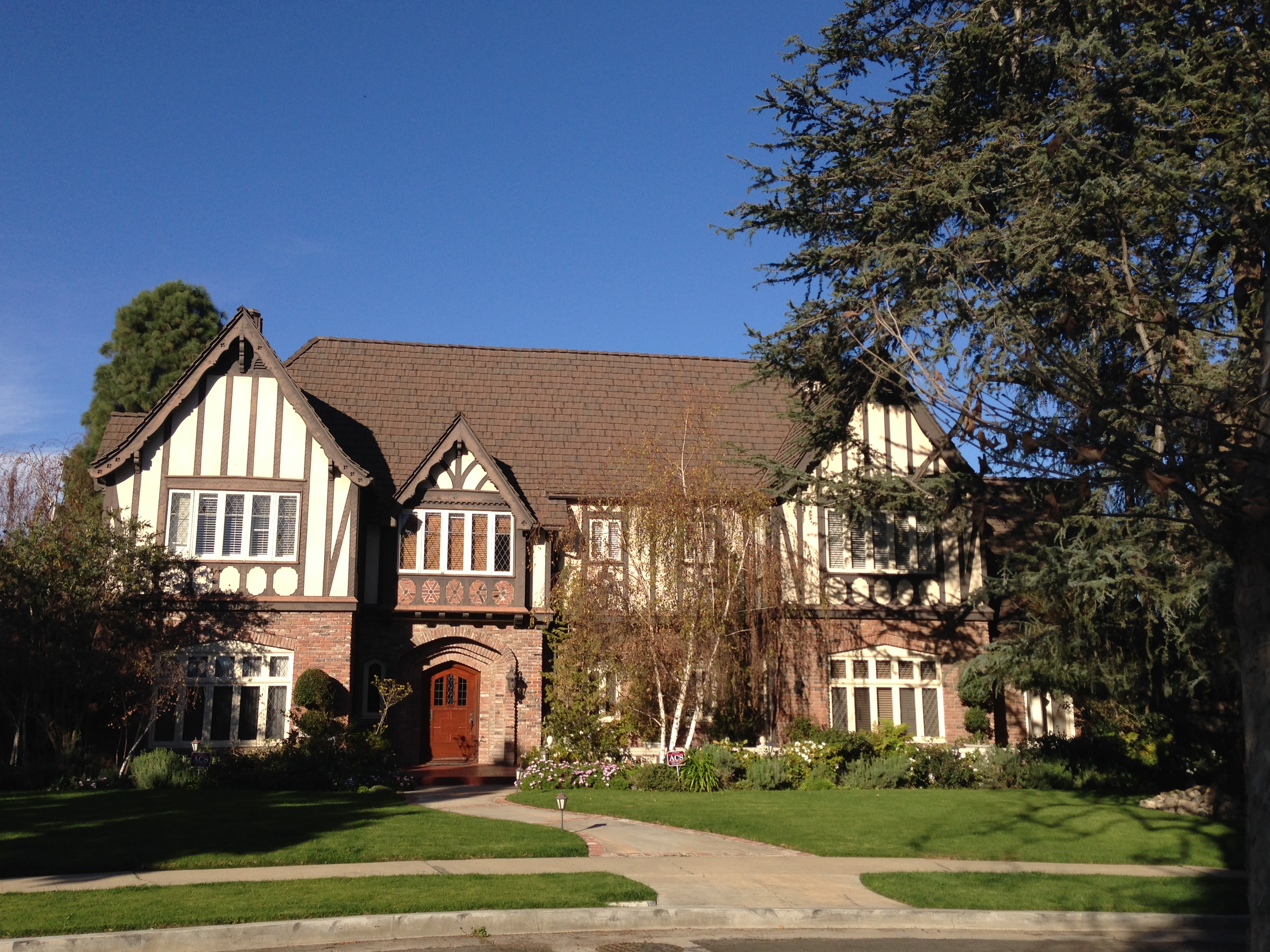
A golf course adjacent mansion in the wealthy Los Angeles neighborhood of Cheviot Hills. The neighborhood contains a total of two golf courses.

In residential sales, a golf property is a piece of real estate linked to a golf course. Golf property can be in the ownership of the golf course or in proximity to the golf course. The concept of combining the design of a golf course with a subdivision housing property originated in the United States and is now found in many parts of the world.

Golf properties are an example of niche real estate, a specialized sector of the property market. Golf properties have been found to boost property values, but can be associated with certain risks. Home values can decrease if the course attached to it falls into disrepair or mismanagement. In 2022, a family won a $5,000,000 settlement against a country club after their home was hit by over 600 golf balls. In 2025, a study found that living nearby a golf course could be associated with a higher incidental risk of Parkinson's disease with it being attributed to the use of Pesticides and Herbicides on golf courses and it causing drinking water contamination.

A golf course community is a type of residential housing development built around a golf course.

== History ==
Temple Terrace, Florida is often described as the first planned golf-course community in the United States, dating from the 1920s. The community was intended only for the very wealthy who would reside there for an only a few months of the year during the winter. For example, the original homes were built without kitchens as it was planned that they would dine at the community clubhouse.

As golf became a sport also played by the middle class of the United States by the 1950s and 1960s, golf course communities also were developed for those players. During a period of "boom growth" in United States golf courses in the 1960s, approximately 25% of courses built each year were developed as a part of a real estate development.

That percentage rose to 60% during the 1990s as "master planned golf communities" grew in popularity. Under this model, the operating costs of the golf course were to be subsidized by lot sales, and lots would be sold a premium due to their location on the course. This led, however, to many unprofitable courses, and the closing of many courses.

In 1999, it was reported that three states with the most golf course communities in the United States were Florida with 419, California with 137, and North Carolina with 126.

In 2009, it was estimated that of 16,000 golf courses in the United States, more than 3,200 were part of a real estate development. More than fifty such courses closed between 2006 and early 2009.

When a development's golf course closes, a developer typically seeks to build houses or otherwise develop the former course property, leading to disputes with homeowners who purchased homes based on their views of the course. Often, however, though buyers assumed the course would always remain in the community, there is no legal basis to force the course to continue operations. In 2015, a survey of the National Association of Home Builders found that two-thirds of homebuyers are not seeking to live on a golf course. Declining interest in golf communities has led to reports of decreasing home values.
