= Addiction Research Center Inventory =

Questionnaire assessing psychoactive drugs

The Addiction Research Center Inventory, abbreviated ARCI, is a standardized questionnaire for assessing subjective effects of psychoactive drugs that was developed in the early 1960s at the National Institute of Mental Health Addiction Research Center. This self-report inventory was developed from the use of "sentence completion" and other association techniques on male subjects under drug and no-drug conditions. In addition to demonstrated "drug-sensitive" questions, the final form of the inventory (550 "true-false" items) also contains items which were thought to delineate to some extent schizoid and "psychopathic" characteristics. Initial use indicated that the inventory was effective in differentiating various subjective effects of drugs and in discriminating some similarities and differences of naturally occurring and experimentally induced behavioral abnormalities.

== See also ==
- Psychological testing
- Psychoactive drug
