= Robert von Hagge =

American golf course architect

Robert von Hagge (April 27, 1927 – September 17, 2010, born Robert Bernhardt Hagge) was an American golf course architect credited with the design of more than 250 courses in over 20 countries.

After working for a time as a commercial artist, Robert entered Purdue University Agriculture School, while serving in the Navy's V-12 O.C.S. program. He subsidized his education cost by freelancing as a commercial artist to outdoor magazines, and appeared in television commercials as the Marlboro Man. In 1955, Dick Wilson, one of America's foremost golf course architects, employed Robert as an apprentice golf course designer. By 1962, Robert had been involved in all or part of the design of 40 golf courses in the U.S. and the Caribbean and four foreign countries. In 1963 he resigned his affiliation with the Dick Wilson Company in order to start his own firm, changing his surname to "Von Hagge".

Von Hagge designed (or participated in the design) of many award-winning golf courses, including: The Club at Emerald Hills (Hollywood), Doral "Blue Monster" (Miami), Boca Rio (Boca Raton), TPC Prestancia, Torreon Golf Club, The Woodlands TPC (Texas), Walden on Lake Conroe (Texas), The Cliffs (Texas), Buenos Aires Golf Club (Argentina), La Costa (California) Bosque Real (Mexico City), Les Bordes (France) (created by von Hagge on the hunting estate of the owners of the Bic pen company), Le Golf National (Paris) 2018 Ryder Cup venue, Kawaguchi-ko CC (Japan), The Lakes (Sydney, Australia), Empordà Golf Resort (Catalonia, Spain), Isla Navidad (Colima, Mexico).
