= Arcis =

Arcis may refer to:

- Larcis, or Arcis, a river in southwestern France
- Arcis-sur-Aube, a commune in the Grand Est region in north-central France
  - Canton of Arcis-sur-Aube
- Arcis-le-Ponsart, a commune in the Marne department in northeastern France
- Artsyz, a town in south-western Ukraine
- University ARCIS, a private university in Chile
- Marc Arcis (1655–1739), a French sculptor

== See also ==
- ARCI (disambiguation)
