= The Woodlands Resort =

Resort in The Woodlands, Texas

Coordinates: 30°8.575′N 95°28.430′W

The Woodlands Resort & Conference Center is a resort in The Woodlands, Texas. The resort is operated by the Woodlands Development Company and was founded in 1974 by George P. Mitchell, an American businessman and real estate developer.

== History ==
The property was named the Woodlands Inn when it was established as a 218-room hotel in 1974. Guest rooms offered full kitchens at that time, and the south wing of the property had boutique shopping, an ice rink and the only restaurant in the area. During the 1980s, the property was transformed into a meetings destination and became known as the Woodlands Inn & Country Club. In 1981, the hotel was one of the founding members of the International Association of Conference Centers (IACC).

From 1989 through 2002, the property invested in larger meeting space, additional guest rooms and spacious public areas. The property's first of many landmark expansions occurred in 1996 when the resort opened the Shell Learning Center, designed specifically for Shell Oil Company. The Center added 35,000 square feet (3,300 m^{2}) of functional meeting space and invested $27.5 million to build the Forest Oasis Waterscape, a collection of water slides, swimming pools, fountains and other features.

The Woodlands Resort & Conference Center is receiving a $50 million renovation and expansion project which will add 158 new guestrooms, the addition of a winding river as well as a new entrance and a steakhouse. This project was expected to be completed in early 2009.

== Golf ==
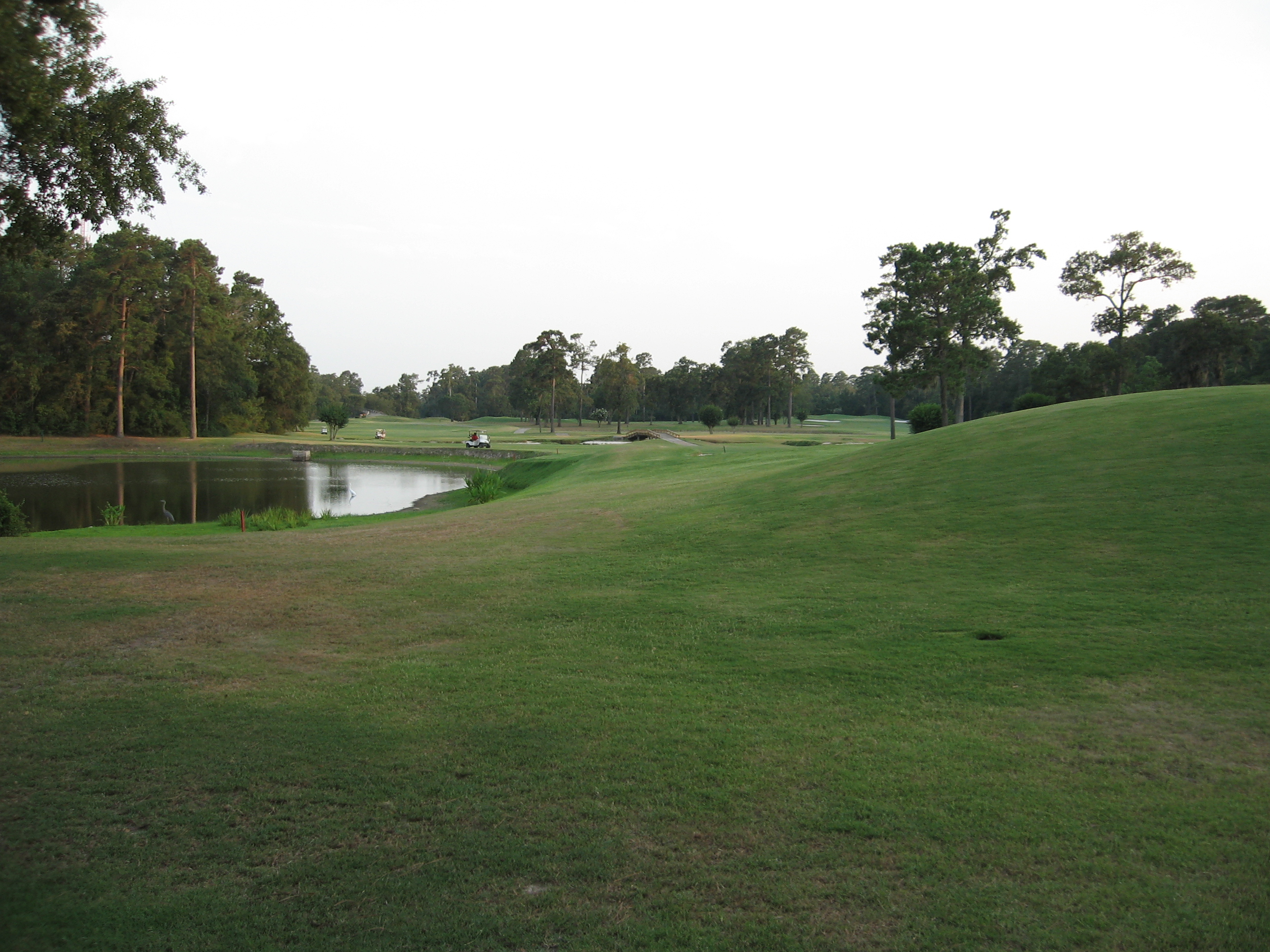
Looking south from green to tee on the 16th hole of The Oaks course

The Woodlands Resort offers 36-holes of on-property golf at the Oaks and Panther Trail courses. Nine holes of the Oaks course were part of the original layout configured by Robert Von Hagge in 1975. The renovation of Panther Trail started in May 2002 by course architect Roy Case. The resort has hosted many golf events including the American Junior Golf Association's Easter Event from 1985 to 1999. Players who have competed at the Woodlands include Tiger Woods, Phil Mickelson, Jim Furyk, David Duval and Bob May.
