= Friendswood Development Company =

Real estate company based in the United States

- Type: Subsidiary of Lennar
- Industry: Real estate
- Founded: 1962, as a subsidiary of Humble Oil
- Headquarters: Houston, Texas
- Area served: Greater Houston
- Key people: John Hammond, President
- Owner: Lennar
- Website: friendswooddevelopment.com

Friendswood Development Company is a real estate development company operating in Greater Houston. The company is a subsidiary of Lennar.

The company is best known for developing Kingwood, a 15,000-acre master-planned community northeast of Houston with more than 20,000 homes, developed over a 40-year period. The company also developed the Clear Lake City area near NASA in 1962.

== History timeline ==
- The company was founded in 1962 as a subsidiary of Humble Oil, now ExxonMobil.
- In 1963, the company established Clear Lake City, its first project.
- In 1970, The company developed Kingwood master planned community.
- In 1991, the company broke ground on the first new office building in Houston in 5 years.
- In June 1995, Exxon put the company up for sale.
- In December 1995, Lennar acquired the company for $110 million.
- In 2014, the company expanded several of its communities.
- In 2015, the company announced 3 new communities in northeast Houston.
- In 2016, the company opened Knoll Park, its first development in urban Houston.
- In 2017, the company launched its third residential development in Houston.
