= Horse community =

A horse community or equestrian community is a planned real estate development or community where people live with their horses on their property or at a facility within the rural or suburban development, with a shared trails network for pleasure riding. There are usually a number of deeded restrictions that can include specific rules concerning the use of the property, deeded community horse trails, the number of horses allowed per lot, and restrictions on commercial use of the horse trails. Many of these communities are gated and/or guarded, implying wealthy residents, but not all are. These equestrian communities sometimes have a centralized barn with arenas where all of the horses are stalled, but otherwise the horses are kept on the individual property owners' lots. In the United States, these communities are located throughout the country and are diverse in both price and size. These communities appear to be growing in popularity as the availability of riding trails decreases and urban sprawl increases.

== Developments ==
Equestrian Communities are platted housing developments that include amenities suited for horse boarding and riding. Since the mid-1970s, this particular sector of amenity community development has become an increasing trend. This study was designed to take a look at the way these communities are designed; where they are located; how they are managed; and, to whom they are marketed. Designing equestrian communities requires knowledge of how these communities are designed, where the land comes from, why people are buying into them and who those people are. Case study methodology was used to gather data on 22 communities across the US. Data sources included review of the marketing websites belonging to the communities; a literature review; and, interviews conducted with individuals responsible for the design and sales of the communities' lots or the management of the equestrian facilities. Statistics and images of the communities, including plats where available, were compiled into community "cut sheets" which are single-page synopses of each community.

== Equestrian market ==
The American Horse Council Federation recently commissioned a study on the horse industry. They have concluded that as much as $102 billion are either directly or indirectly contributed to the American economy with over 2 million horse owners throughout the country. There are horses in every state, even Hawaii, which has an equine population of 8,037. California (698,345 horses), Texas (978,822) and Florida are the three largest populations for horses.

Horse properties are in a niche real estate market devoted to serving the interests of horse riders. Horse properties tend to be near horse riding stables or near to good locations for horse riding. Owners benefit from proximity to neighbors with equestrian interests, equestrian facilities such as tack shops, veterinarians, and farriers, as well as riding trails and tracks.

== See also ==
- Equestrianism
