= George P. Mitchell =

American billionaire businessman and shale gas pioneer

- Mitchell in 2011
- Born: May 21, 1919; Galveston, Texas, U.S.
- Died: July 26, 2013 (aged 94); Tremont House, Galveston, Texas, U.S.
- Education: Texas A&M University
- Occupations: Founder of Mitchell Energy & Development Corp.; philanthropist
- Years active: 1950s–1990s
- Known for: Hydraulic fracturing pioneer, The Woodlands, Texas developer, Galveston, Texas restoration, philanthropic support of sustainability
- Spouse: Cynthia Woods Mitchell
- Children: 10
- Website: Cynthia and George Mitchell Foundation

George Phydias Mitchell (May 21, 1919 – July 26, 2013) was an American businessman, real estate developer and philanthropist from Texas credited with pioneering the economic extraction of shale gas.

== Early life ==
Mitchell was born to Greek immigrant parents in the port city of Galveston, Texas in 1919. His father, born Savvas Paraskevopoulos, was from the village of Nestani in Arcadia where he tended goats before immigrating to the United States in 1901, arriving at Ellis Island at the age of 20. He worked for railroads, and gradually moved west. When a paymaster got tired of writing his long name and threatened to fire him, Mr. Paraskevopoulos took the paymaster's name, Mike Mitchell. Mike Mitchell settled in Galveston, where he ran a succession of shoe-shining and pressing shops. When he saw the picture of a beautiful woman in a local Greek newspaper, he headed for Florida, where she had settled, according to family lore. He persuaded her to abandon her fiancé and marry him. They lived above the shoeshine shop.

== Oil and gas business ==
In 1940, George Mitchell earned a degree in petroleum engineering with an emphasis in geology from Texas A&M University. He graduated as the valedictorian in his class and was also the captain of the men's tennis team.

He started an independent oil and gas company, Mitchell Energy & Development Corp., which grew into a Fortune 500 company. He participated in the development of about 10,000 wells, including more than 1000 wildcat wells.

In the 1980s and 1990s, the company experimented with application of different techniques of hydraulic fracturing of the Barnett Shale of Texas, eventually finding the right technique to economically extract the natural gas in the formation. The approach was widely adopted by the gas industry and spawned a new gas boom in North America. The Potential Gas Committee estimates that U.S. recoverable reserves will last 118 years at current production levels. but (as of 2014) production was expected to more than triple by 2020. Because of the technological progress in industry fracking, George Mitchell is now known as the "pioneer of shale". Mitchell Energy & Development Corp. was later acquired by Devon Energy.

== Real estate development ==
Mitchell was the developer of The Woodlands, an unincorporated yet governmentally structured township in Montgomery County, Texas, which he developed from timberland located 32 miles north of downtown Houston. He brought on landscape architect Ian McHarg to consult on the project. The master plan for the community called for preserving trees, protecting the environment, minimizing flooding and creating a "pleasant" urban environment. In 2010, The Woodlands was home to 97,000 people. When fully developed the population will have reached 130,000.

== Philanthropy ==
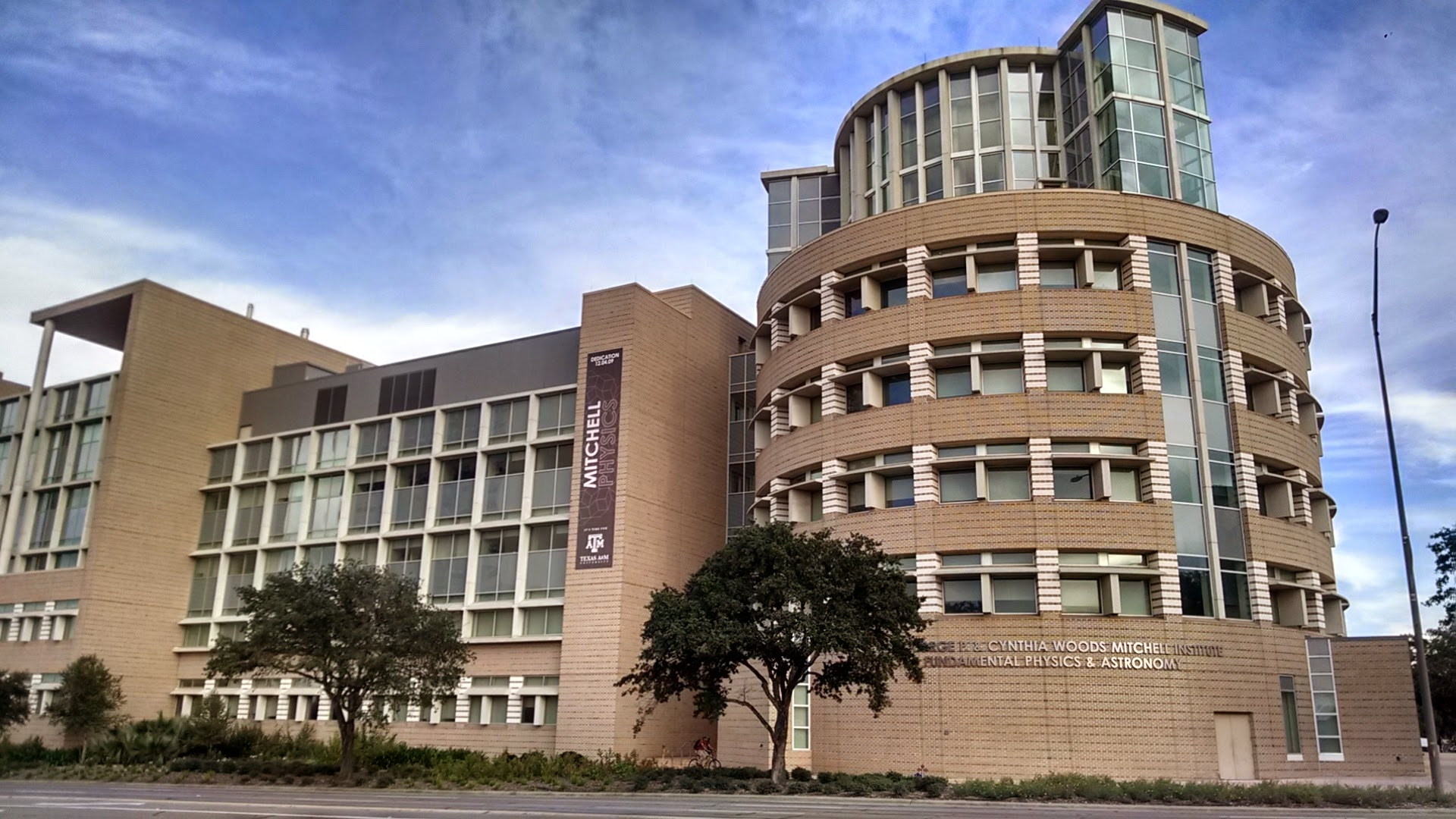
The Mitchell Physics Building on Texas A&M University's campus.

Mitchell and his wife Cynthia, along with the Cynthia and George Mitchell Foundation, have distributed or pledged more than $900 million in grants to causes, programs, and institutions.

The vast majority of this amount is related to science, environmental sustainability, and sustainability science-related fields, including the foundation's current grant-making programs which focus on sustainability science, clean energy, water, and natural gas sustainability.

On December 7, 2010, he joined the Giving Pledge sponsored by Warren Buffett and Bill and Melinda Gates, making public his and Cynthia's long-held private intent that the majority of their wealth would be donated to charitable causes.

According to the National Academies of Science, "In the 1970s [Mitchell] helped sponsor the work of Dennis Meadows, whose Club of Rome study The Limits to Growth was a global wake-up call on the pressing need for sustainable energy technologies and food sources worldwide."

Enabled by Mitchell's donation of $35 million, the Texas A&M University Physics department relocated to two new buildings in late 2009: The George P. and Cynthia W. Mitchell Fundamental Physics and Astronomy Building and the George P. Mitchell Physics Building. In 2012, he committed an additional $20 million to the Mitchell Institute for Fundamental Physics and Astronomy. This donation was the latest in a series supporting science and the physics department in particular. With previous gifts supporting academic chairs, professorships and the Giant Magellan Telescope project, the Mitchells are Texas A&M's most generous modern benefactors, with donations totaling nearly $100 million; by 2011, his total contributions to universities and research organizations had reached $159 million.

Mitchell and his wife were also major supporters of Texas A&M's marine studies-oriented branch campus Texas A&M University at Galveston (TAMUG), donating the land for the main campus and the main campus is named in honor of Mitchell's father. Mitchell made numerous other gifts to the university over the years, including the donation of a yacht named S.V. Cynthia Mitchell named after his wife Cynthia.

Mitchell had a lifelong passion for tennis, and the tennis center at Texas A&M University, where he was captain of the tennis team, was named in his honor. Built for an estimated $4.2 million, the official ribbon cutting ceremony was held on October 23, 1998.

In 1984, he was the recipient of an honorary doctoral degree from the University of Houston.

== Personal life ==
In 2004, Forbes magazine estimated his net worth as $1.6 billion, placing him among the 500 richest people worldwide. Mitchell died at the age of 94 on July 26, 2013, at his home in Galveston of natural causes, while surrounded by relatives. He was predeceased by his wife, Cynthia, who died on December 27, 2009, and his two brothers, Christie and Johnny. He was survived by his sister, Maria Mitchell Ballantyne; his ten children, daughters Pamela Maguire, Meredith Dreiss and Sheridan Lorenz, and sons Scott, Mark, Kent, Greg, Kirk, Todd and Grant; 23 grandchildren, 5 great grandchildren and 19 nieces and nephews.
