= W.W. Thorne Stadium =

American football and soccer venue in Houston, Texas

Coordinates: 29.932306°N 95.36106°W

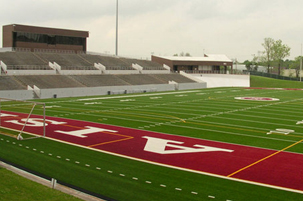
- Interactive map of W.W. Thorne Stadium
- Location: 1865 Aldine-Bender Road; Houston, Texas 77032
- Owner: Aldine Independent School District
- Capacity: 10,000 (est.)
- Surface: FieldTurf (installed 2008)
- Scoreboard: Spectrum Video Scoreboard (installed 2014)

Construction
- Opened: 1979
- Renovated: 2022 - 2024
- Closed: 2022
- Reopened: 2024
- Demolished: 2023
- Cost: $4.39 million
- Architects: Dansby & Miller Architects; D. Douglas Robb
- General contractor: Lee Rowe Construction Co.

Tenants
- Aldine Mustangs; Davis Falcons; Eisenhower Eagles; MacArthur Generals; Nimitz Cougars; Texas Southern Tigers

W.W. Thorne Stadium, an American football and soccer venue, is the home stadium of the Aldine Independent School District's (Aldine ISD) five varsity high school football teams - the Aldine Mustangs, Davis Falcons, Eisenhower Eagles, MacArthur Generals and Nimitz Cougars of District 18-6A, as well as for each schools' varsity boys and girls soccer teams. The stadium is also home to Texas Southern. Thorne Stadium is located in north Houston, Texas, on Aldine-Bender Road just south of Beltway 8, a short distance from George Bush Intercontinental Airport and Greenspoint Mall. It is part of the Aldine ISD Athletic Complex, which includes Thorne Stadium, the M.O. Campbell Center for basketball and volleyball, Elliott Lansford Field for baseball, and the Aldine ISD Softball Complex for softball.

Thorne Stadium seats approximately 10,000 fans and has parking for 1,600 cars. The home stands are located on the west side, while the east side is the visitors' side. The playing field is at ground level while each set of stands is built into an artificial earthen embankment. Fans enter the stadium through four gates situated at the top of each corner of the facility. Concessions and restrooms are located adjacent to the entrances.

Thorne Stadium's amenities include a FieldTurf artificial playing surface and a 36-foot by 19-foot Spectrum video scoreboard located in the north end of the stadium. There are also two air-conditioned dressing rooms, two training rooms, an officials’ dressing room and a conference room (all located in the adjoining M.O. Campbell Center arena in the south end of the stadium). Thorne Stadium's press box contains facilities for scoreboard/clock operation, TV/radio broadcasts, newspaper reporting, game filming and several coaches’ boxes.

The stadium hosts Aldine ISD varsity football and soccer games, and has often been used by other southeast Texas schools as a neutral playoff site. The facility was also the home stadium for the Blue Chip Classic high school all-star football game. The St. Louis BattleHawks of the XFL will use the stadium for its preseason training camp from January 2020. As of 2022, Thorne Stadium is undergoing a major renovation which will be expected to be completed by 2024.

== History ==
Aldine Independent School District (Aldine ISD) voters approved a $29 million bond package in 1973 that included funds for a number of new building projects, including construction of a new athletic complex, of which a football stadium would be one component.

Little or no action was taken on the project until 1977. On September 8, 1977, a small section of the home side (west) bleachers at the existing Aldine Athletic Stadium (located on the campus of Aldine High School) collapsed before a high school football game between the home Aldine Mustangs and the visiting Carver Panthers. Five Aldine High band members were injured when they fell through the resulting hole 20 feet to the pavement below. The stadium was closed for the rest of the football season pending an investigation. The four Aldine ISD varsity football teams at the time (Aldine, Carver, MacArthur and Eisenhower) had to play their remaining home games at Cy-Fair ISD's Bobcat Stadium, which was vacant because Cy-Fair had just opened a new football stadium a few weeks before.

In January 1978, Aldine ISD announced plans for a new $4.39 million, 10,000-seat stadium to replace Aldine Athletic Stadium in time for the start of 1979 high school football season. The stadium would be located on a 47-acre plot on Aldine-Bender Road, just to the east of Aldine-Westfield, near the district's central office and its original set of schools. The stadium's design would be similar to that of the then-recently opened Mercer Stadium in Fort Bend ISD.

Eventually, Aldine ISD would name its new stadium in honor of W.W. Thorne, who had been the district's superintendent of schools from 1958 to 1973. Thorne had guided Aldine ISD through a financial crisis that threatened to close the district in 1959 and oversaw its tremendous growth through the 1960s and early 1970s.

Thorne Stadium was slated to open September 7, 1979, with the Aldine Mustangs hosting the Conroe Tigers. However, workers had not finished installation of the stadium's artificial playing surface and the game was moved to Aldine Athletic Stadium. Eisenhower High School's season-opener against C.E. King on September 8 was also moved to Aldine Athletic Stadium. Instead, the visiting Houston Lee Generals defeated the home team MacArthur Generals 31-13 in the stadium's first game a week later, on September 14.

In 1996, Aldine ISD replaced Thorne Stadium's original field house in the facility's south end with the M.O. Campbell Center multipurpose arena. Football and soccer teams have since used the Campbell Center's dressing and conference rooms to prepare for games.

On August 30, 2008, KTRK-TV broadcast the Nimitz Cougars’ season-opening football game at Thorne Stadium against the visiting Alief Elsik Rams on its digital channel, 13.2. Two years later, on September 4, 2010, KTRK-TV broadcast the Aldine Mustangs' game against the Deer Park Deer from Thorne Stadium, again on its 13.2 digital channel. The game was noteworthy in that the head coaches of both teams – Chris Massey of Deer Park and Lionell Crawford of Aldine – were former Aldine High School quarterbacks.

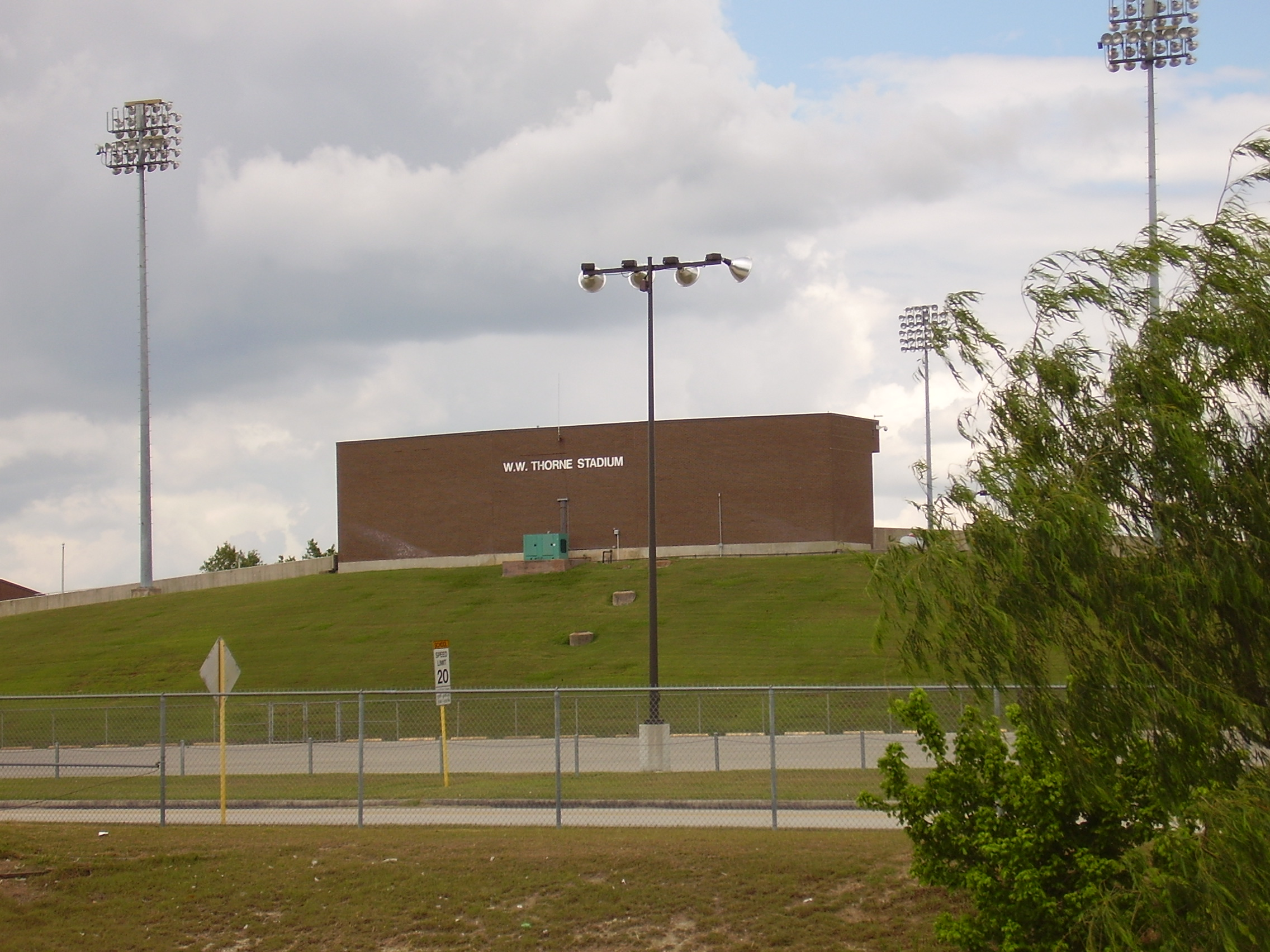
Pre-renovation exterior of Thorne Stadium

Thorne Stadium has been home for several successful football teams since its opening in 1979. The Aldine Mustangs won the 1990 Texas Class 5A Regular Division state title and ESPN (in conjunction with the National Prep Poll) named them its mythical national high school football champs that season as well. Aldine had also advanced to the Class 5A Finals in 1989. The MacArthur Generals reached the 1993 Class 5A Division II Finals while the Eisenhower Eagles made it to the 1999 Class 5A Division I championship game.

As of the end of the 2015 football season, Eisenhower has won or shared 11 district titles since Thorne Stadium's opening in 1979, Aldine nine, MacArthur four, while Nimitz and Davis have one apiece. Each team has also advanced to the playoffs numerous times as district runner-up (except Davis, which only began varsity play in 2014 and has one runner-up playoff berth and one shared district championship in two seasons).

In June 2022, Aldine ISD voted to replace Thorne Stadium with a new stadium on the site of the current stadium. The newly renovated stadium is set to open in 2024. While the renovations are ongoing, the varsity football teams in Aldine ISD are to play their home games at George Stadium in Spring ISD. The newly renovated stadium, also to be named Thorne Stadium, will begin construction after the existing Thorne Stadium is demolished. It will feature two tiered stands, a community room, improved parking, a new larger scoreboard, along with other improvements. Also, the stadium's West Side and East Side lighting will change colors, depending on which home team is playing.
