= Victory Early College High School =

Public school in Texas, United States

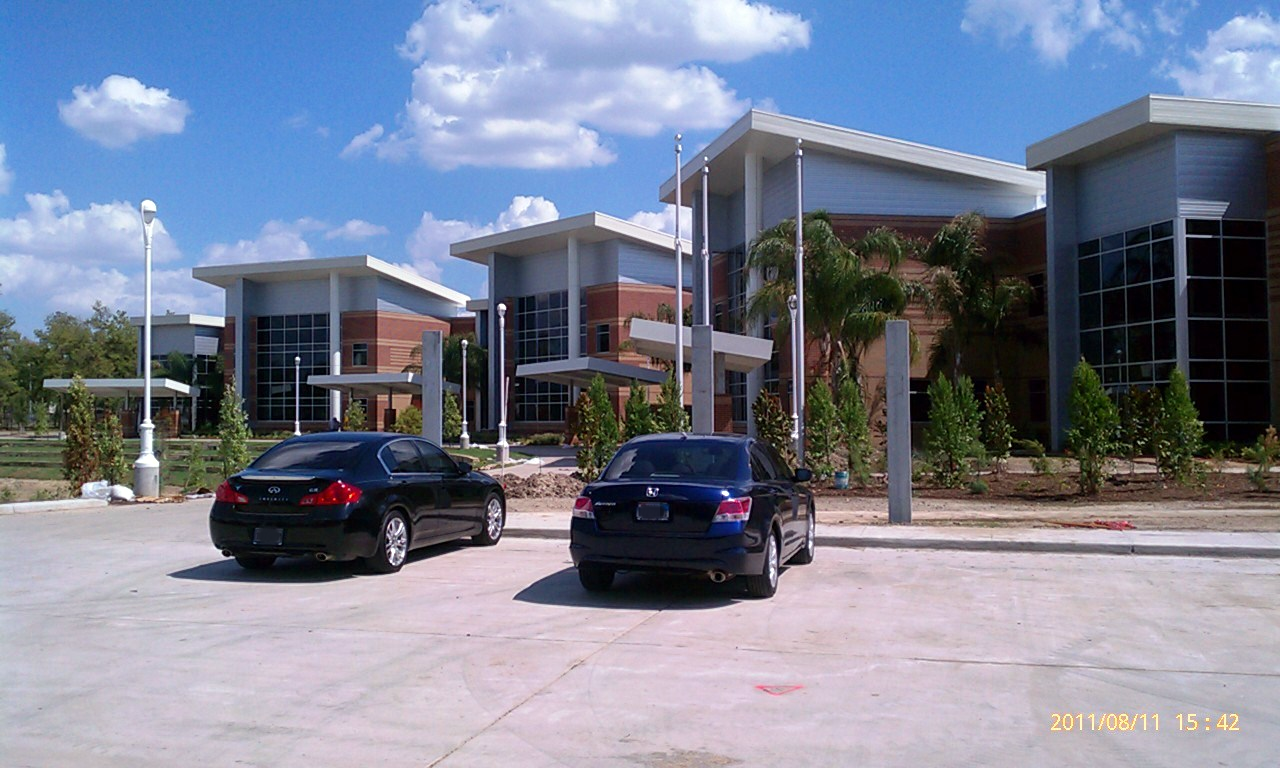

Location
- Coordinates: 29.868082°N 95.466133°W

Information
- School type: Public early college high school
- Established: 2007
- School district: Aldine Independent School District
- Principal: Cedric Stewart
- Grades: 9-12
- Color(s): Green
- Mascot: Vikings
- Website: victoryhs.aldineisd.org

Victory Early College High School is an early college high school (commonly referred to as Victory Early College) in Houston, Texas. Part of the Aldine Independent School District, it operates in partnership with Lone Star College System, and offers students an opportunity to pursue a high school diploma and an Associate degree at the same time.

After a pilot program between the Aldine district and North Harris College began in 2006, Victory Early College began operations in 2007 with a freshman class of 115 students, housed in the college's satellite campus next to Carver High School. As of the 2011 school year, the school is located at Lone Star College's new Victory Center facility.
