= Harris College =

Harris College may refer to:

- Harris Manchester College, Oxford, a constituent colleges of the University of Oxford, England
- Harris–Stowe State University, a historically black university in Missouri, United States
- Lone Star College–North Harris, formerly North Harris College, a community college in Texas, United States
- University of Central Lancashire, formerly Harris College, a university in England
- Young Harris College, a liberal arts college in Georgia, United States
