= Acres Homes, Houston =

Neighborhood located in northwest Houston, Texas

Coordinates: 29°51′43″N 95°26′46″W

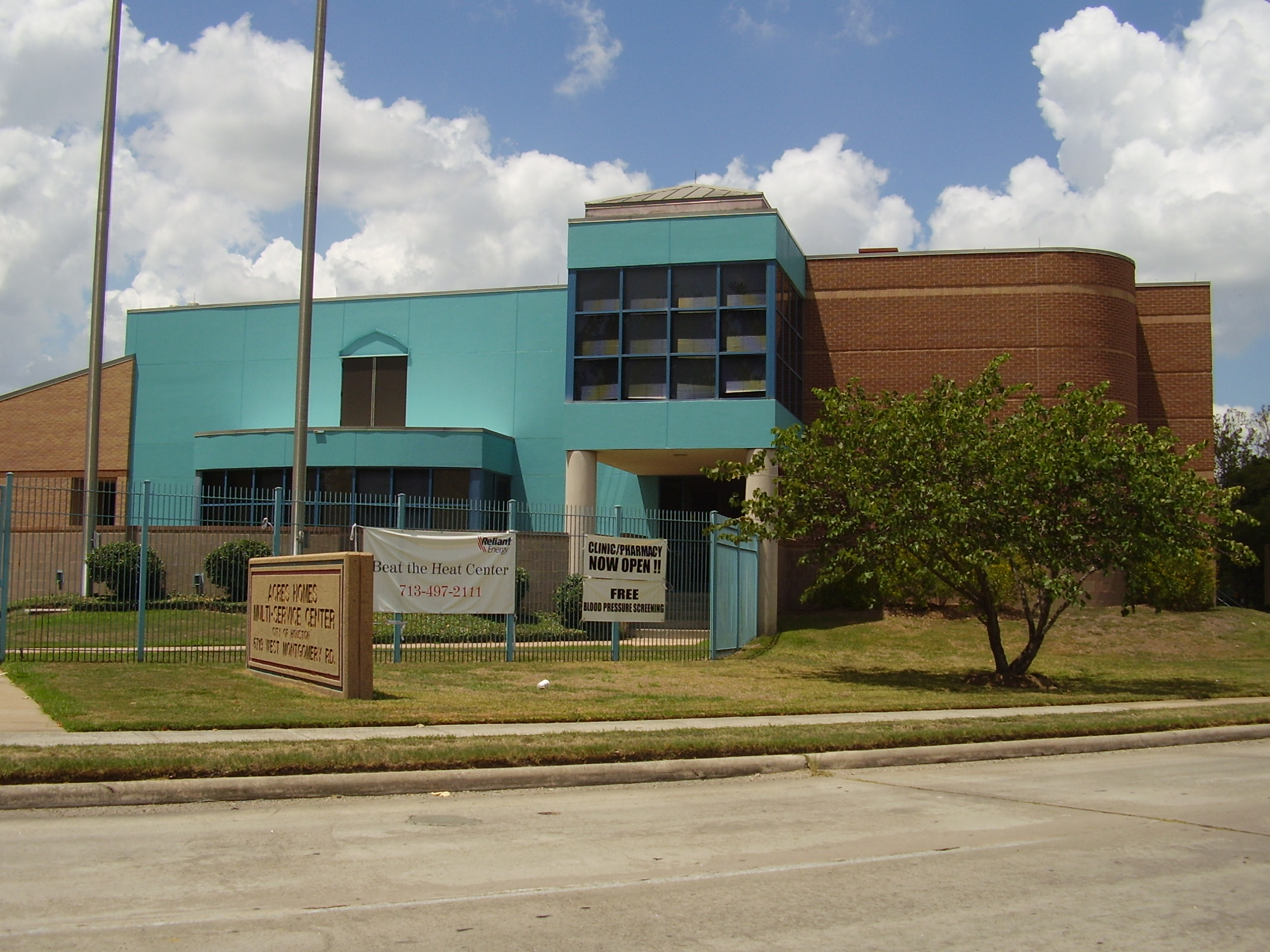
Acres Homes Multi-Service Center

Acres Homes is a neighborhood located in northwest Houston, Texas. The 9-square-mile (23 km^{2}) area is loosely bounded by the city limits and West Gulf Bank Road to the north; Pinemont Drive to the south; North Shepherd Drive to the east; and Alabonson Drive to the west. Historically, it has been predominantly African American. Unincorporated for decades, it was annexed to Houston in 1967.

== History ==
Acres Homes was established during World War I, when Houston landowners began selling homesites in the area that were large enough to contain small gardens and raise chickens or farm animals. These large areas were often divided by the acre and not by the plot, hence the name "Acres Homes". The farm capabilities of the home sites attracted many rural settlers, who dug their own wells, and built small, sanitary houses. Kristen Mack of the Houston Chronicle said that Acres Homes was originally marketed as "a bit of genteel country with quick and easy access to the city." The community was also touted as a place where African Americans could own houses and land instead of being in more dense urban areas. At one time, it was the largest unincorporated African-American community in the Southern United States.

As time went on, the conditions began declining due to several decades of neglect. As the rural settlers moved out of their dilapidated homes, realtors began marketing the area, largely to African Americans, as a suburban area which was not far from the city. In reality, it was a heavily wooded, sparsely settled slum without adequate transportation or educational facilities. The City of Houston annexed about 725 acres (293 ha) of land in the Acres Homes area in 1967. In 1974 the city annexed another 1,469 acres (594 ha) of Acres Homes territory. Mack said that the appeal of Acres Homes ended around the 1970s.

Before it was annexed by the city of Houston, Acres Homes was considered to be the largest unincorporated African American community in the Southern United States. The area's location close to Garden Oaks — a primarily working-class white neighborhood in the 1960s and 1970s- birthed racial tensions in north Houston during the racial equality movement of the time. Annexation began in 1971.

In 1988, the Acres Homes War on Drugs Committee made anti-drug dealing campaigns focused on Andrew Winzer Park. In 1989, President of the United States George H. W. Bush made a speech praising the group. He made the speech with Mayor of Houston Kathy Whitmire while at one of the rallies from the group.

As black populations in predominately African-American neighborhoods in the Houston area declined between 1990 and 2000, Lori Rodriguez of the Houston Chronicle wrote that Acres Homes, along with the MacGregor-Riverside Terrace area, "barely held on to their historical population base."

On August 30, 2007, the Houston Chronicle published an article about a syphilis outbreak in Houston. Marlene McNeese-Ward, the Houston Health Department chief of HIV/STD and Viral Hepatitis Prevention, stated "We're really looking at Acres Homes especially, and Sunnyside, but there's not too many ZIP codes... where we're not seeing any (cases)."

A gated community in the area opened on 9 acres (3.6 ha) of land in 2008. La Sierra, a development on the same size of acreage and adjacent to the original one, was being developed as of 2017. Contempo Builders, operated by David Bohorquez, a Venezuelan American, developed both properties.

In 2016, the Highland Heights Annex Action Committee wrote a letter to their Houston City Council member, Jerry Davis, stating opposition to developments of new industrial facilities and townhouses. Acres Homes is still a predominantly African-American neighborhood.

== Cityscape ==
The community has 9 square miles (23 km^{2}) of land, much of it in a pine forest. Not much of the land, as of 2002, is used for commercial or industrial purposes. Acres Homes had 8,548 housing units in 2002; 31% were rental units. Housing includes mostly smaller tract-style houses, many with wooden frames, with a smaller number of larger houses on lots with trees. Kristen Mack of the Houston Chronicle stated in 2002 that the lots of the "comfortable" larger houses were "well-maintained" while the smaller houses, among them many shotgun houses were "ramshackle". Absentee landlords owned many of the smaller houses.

Rafael Longoria and Susan Rogers of the Rice Design Alliance said that the layout of Acres Homes could be described as "rurban," a word coined in 1918 which describes an area with a mix of urban and rural characteristics. Undeveloped land permeates Acres Homes in a checkerboard-like pattern.

In 2002 Mack stated "Fairly or not, Acres Homes has become synonymous with "urban blight" in Houston" and that Acres Homes "can best be described as a bit schizophrenic." Many acres of land in the community are empty. In 2002, many of the formerly large properties had been sectioned off, and horses were commonplace in the neighborhood. Most areas in Acres Homes had no curbs, no sidewalks, and no storm drains. Deep ditches lined many of the streets. As of 2008 Acres Homes has the largest concentration of closed landfills in Houston, including permitted and unpermitted ones.

== Culture ==
According to Sammie Mae Ford, a resident of Acres Homes quoted in the Houston Chronicle, in the 1920s most of the residents had gardens in their yards and raised chickens and hogs. Ford described Acres Homes as "like it was the country" and "a place where people had to help each other."

In rap media Acres Homes is nicknamed the "44," pronounced "fo-fo." The name originates from the #44 METRO bus route that goes through Acres Homes.

Many residents own horses as well, and it is a common sight to see residents riding on horseback on major streets.

== Government and infrastructure ==
=== Local government ===
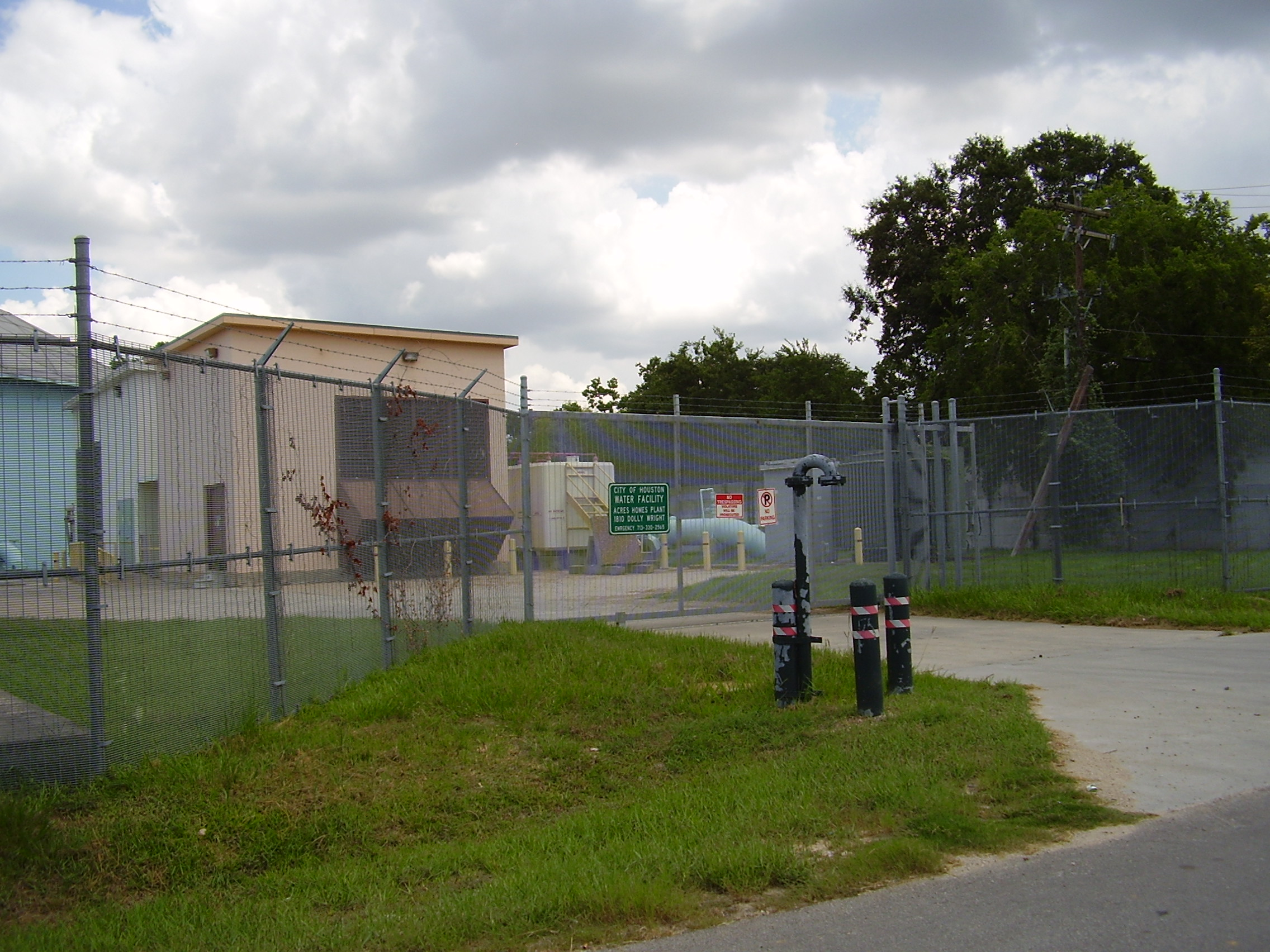
City of Houston Water Facility Acres Homes Plant

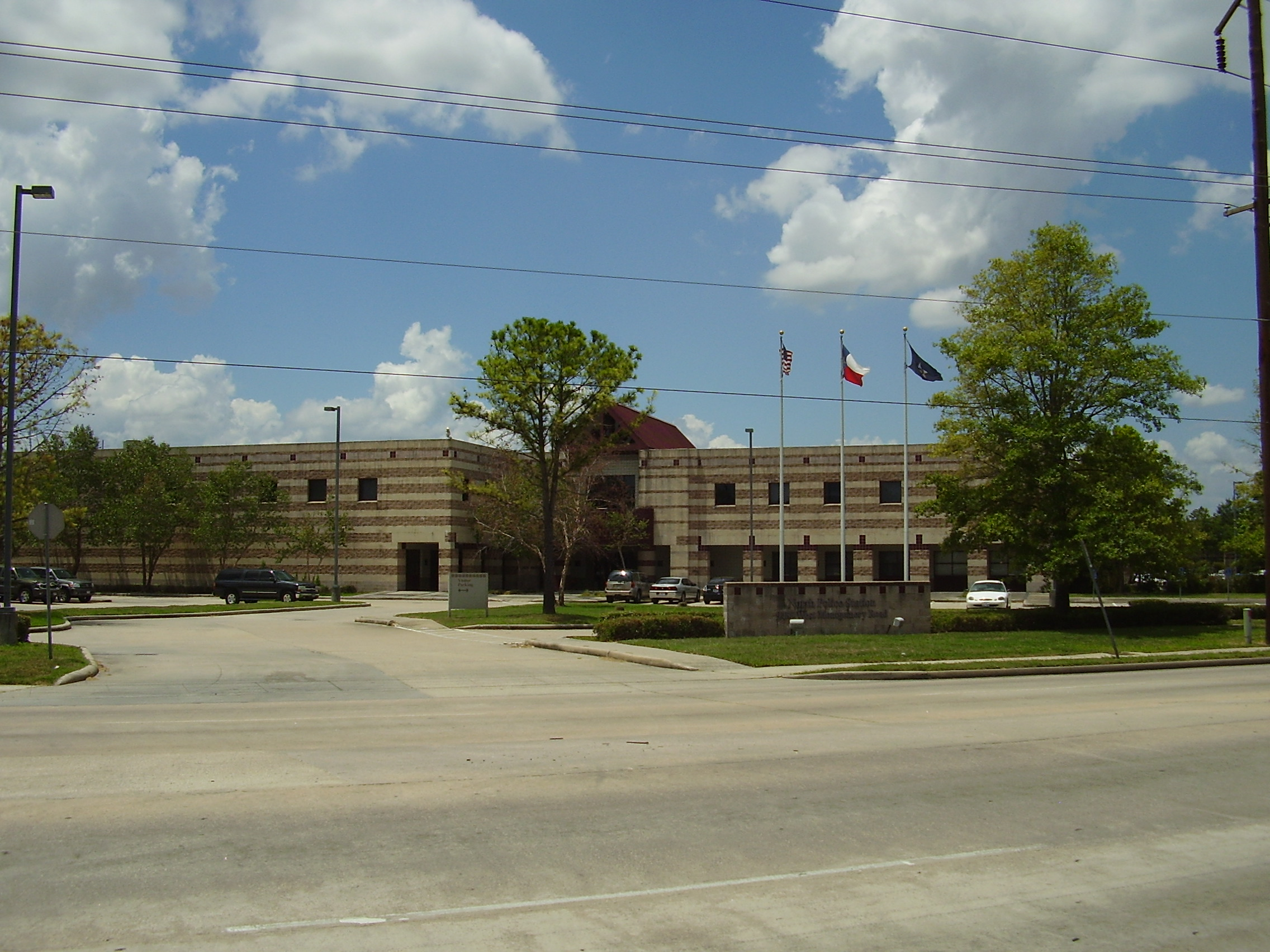
North Police Station

Acres Homes is in Houston City Council District B.

The area is served by the Houston Police Department's North Division . The department previously operated the Acres Homes Storefront.

The Houston Fire Department operates Station 67 Acres Homes, a part of Fire District 4. The station was built in 1971.

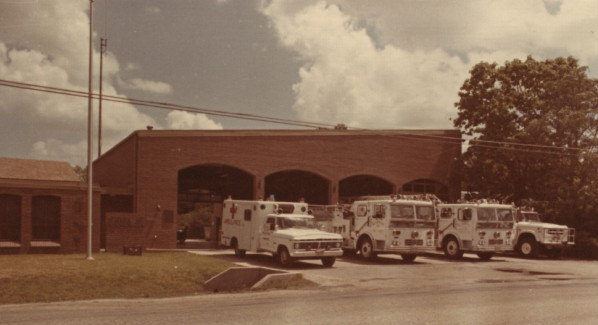
Fire Station 67, 1976

The city operates the Acres Homes Multi-Service Center at 6719 West Montgomery Road. The city multi-service centers provide several services such as child care, programs for elderly residents, and rental space.

Acres Homes is served by many METRO bus routes, most notably bus route #44 ("Acres Homes Limited").

After the city annexed portions of Acres Homes beginning in 1971, it began installing sewer and water lines. Some sparsely developed areas and some surrounding areas remained without city services; private companies install services in the surrounding areas.

In February 2000 the Acres Homes Super Neighborhood was officially recognized. The boundaries of the Acres Homes Super Neighborhood are Texas State Highway 249, Pinemont, North Shepherd, and the White Oak Bayou. Because the Acres Homes Citizens Council already existed, much of the groundwork for the Acres Homes Super Neighborhood had already been established before its formation. In 2000 Michael Thibodeaux, the president of the super neighborhood, said that the citizens council "is pretty much almost the super neighborhood."

Beulah Shephard, described by Kristen Mack of the Houston Chronicle as the "matriarch" of Acres Homes, said in 2002 that the Harris County, which provided services to residents before the Houston annexation, provided better services than the city.

As of 2002 Acres Homes has 16 civic associations that serve portions of the community.

=== County representation ===
The Harris County Hospital District operates the Acres Home Health Center and the Acres Home Eligibility Center in Acres Homes. The health center opened on May 17, 1971. The designated public hospital is Lyndon B. Johnson Hospital in Northeast Houston.

== Demographics ==
According to the 2000 census, the current population of Acres Homes Super Neighborhood #6 is 23,512.

Race and Hispanic origin	Acres Homes Data	% of Area Pop.	Houston City Data
American Indian (non-Hispanic)	14	-%	3,234
Asian (non-Hispanic)	74	0.3%	102,706
Black (non-Hispanic)	20,312	86.4%	487,851
Hispanic (of any race)	2,432	10.3%	730,865
Native Hawaiian (non-Hispanic)	-	-%	680
White (non-Hispanic)	523	2.2%	601,851
Two or More (non-Hispanic)	146	0.6%	23,830
Other (non-Hispanic)	10	-%	2,614

Age Group	Acres Homes Data	% of Area Pop.	Houston City Data
Under 5 Years	1,794	7.6%	160,797
5 - 17 Years	5,337	22.7%	375,861
18 - 65 Years	13,318	56.6%	1,252,908
65 and Over	3,023	12.8%	164,065

In 1997 37% of the residents had an average annual household income below $15,000.

== Media ==
The Houston Chronicle is the citywide newspaper.

The African-American News and Issues was established in 1996 as a community newspaper for Acres Homes.

== Education ==
=== Primary and secondary schools ===
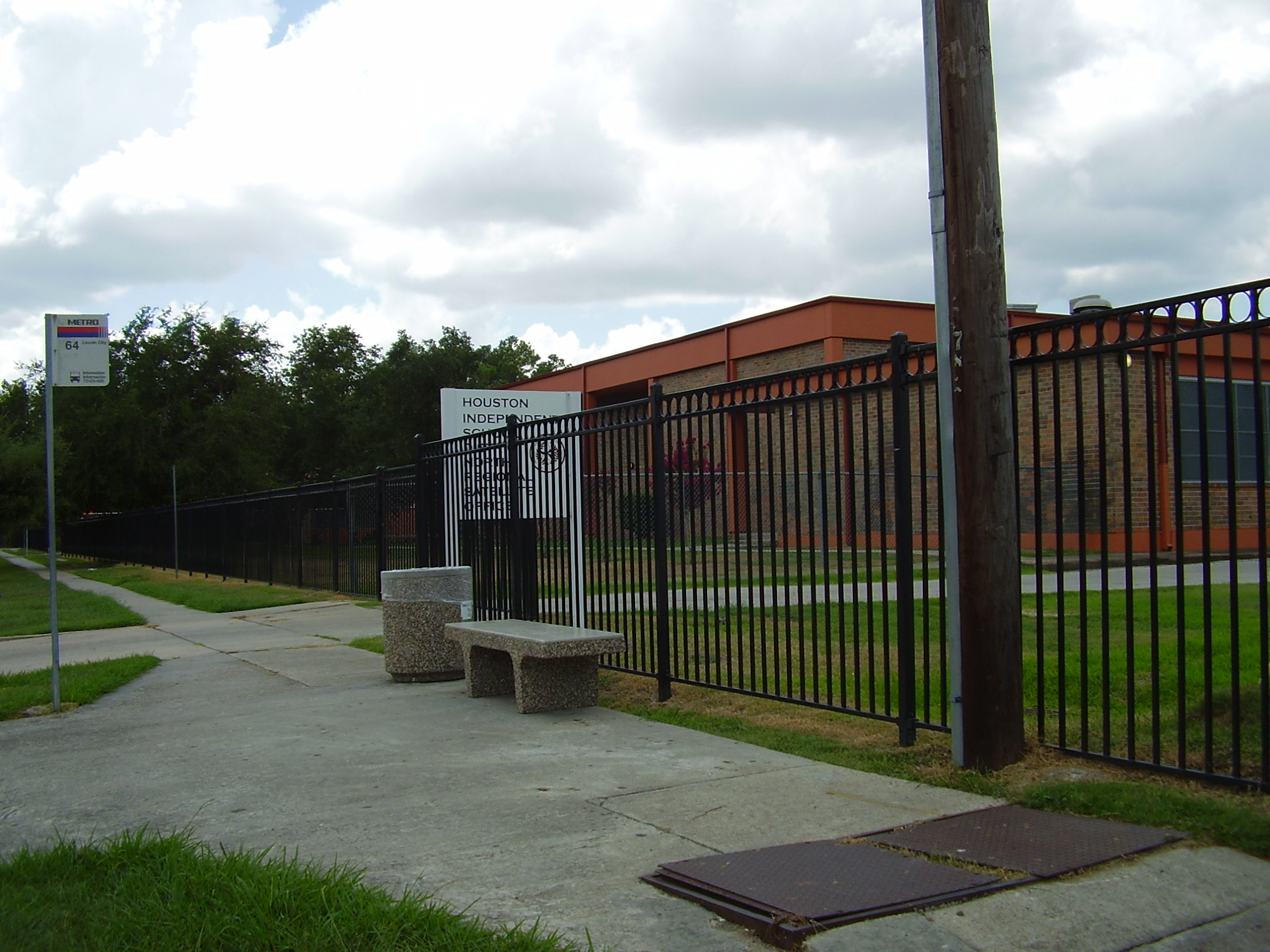
Houston ISD North Regional Satellite Office

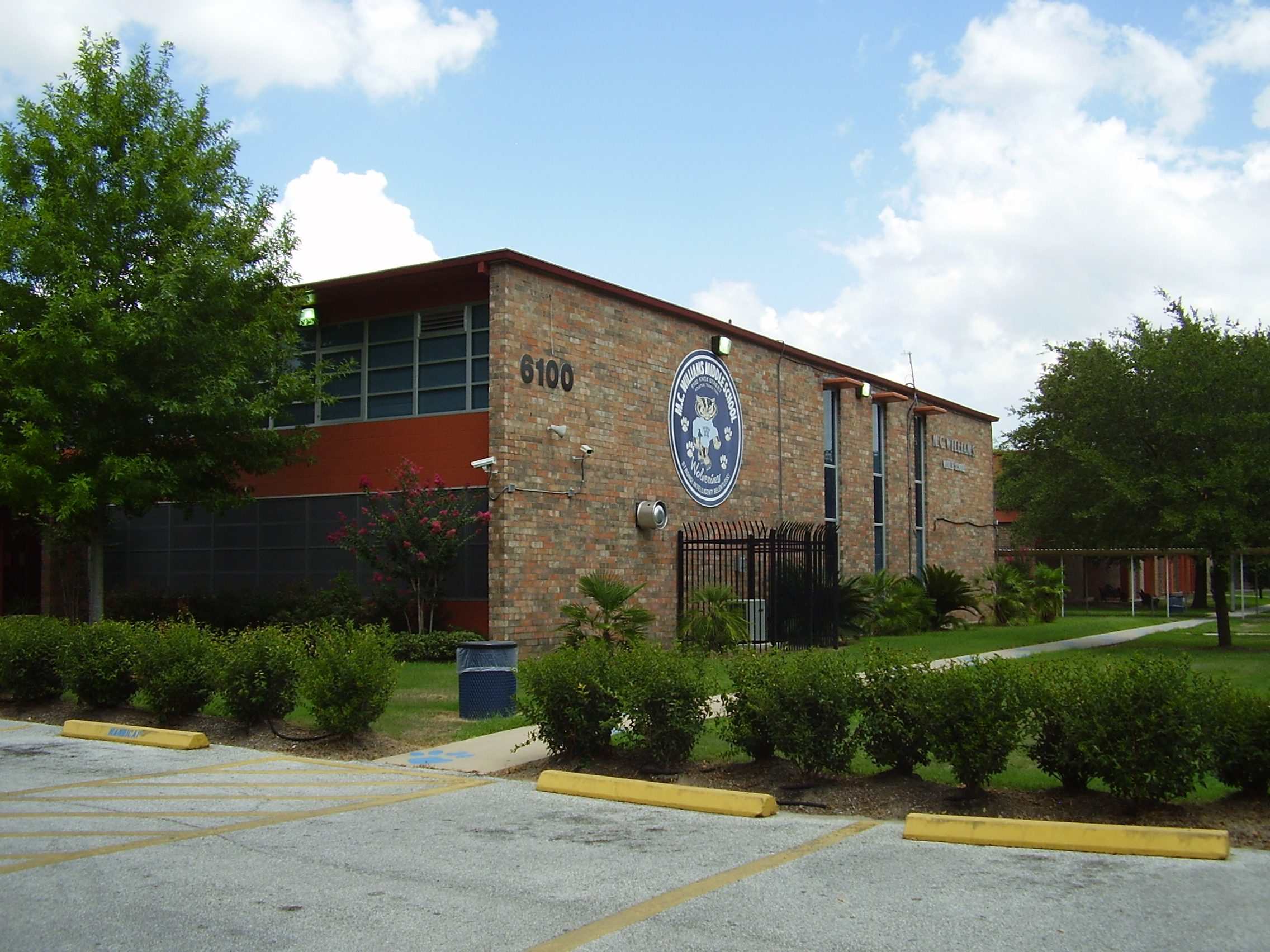
M.C. Williams Middle School

==== Houston Independent School District ====
The eastern part of the community is located in the Houston Independent School District (HISD). The HISD portion is divided by Highland Heights, Wesley, and Osborne Elementary schools. All HISD Acres Homes residents are zoned to Williams Middle School in Acres Homes. All HISD area residents are served by Booker T. Washington High School in the Independence Heights community. Prior to Houston ISD's 2005 reorganization, the Acres homes Administrative Division, headquartered in Wesley Elementary School, helped manage the area elementary and middle schools.

In 2023 Highland Heights Elementary had 469 students. The school failed state accountability ratings in the period 2013-2019 and 2022. In 2023 the assistant superintendent of transformation, Khalilah Campbell-Rhone, stated that the school was improving.

In February 2010 HISD opened the High School Ahead Academy (HSAA) in Acres Homes. It is a school which allows over-age middle school students to rapidly accelerate through school so they can catch up. It is located in the former Hohl Elementary School campus.

In summer 1991 the principal of Wesley, Thaddeus Lott, received media attention, and that fall the school grew by 250 students as area parents, including some from other school districts, wished to enroll their children in Wesley.

==== Aldine Independent School District ====
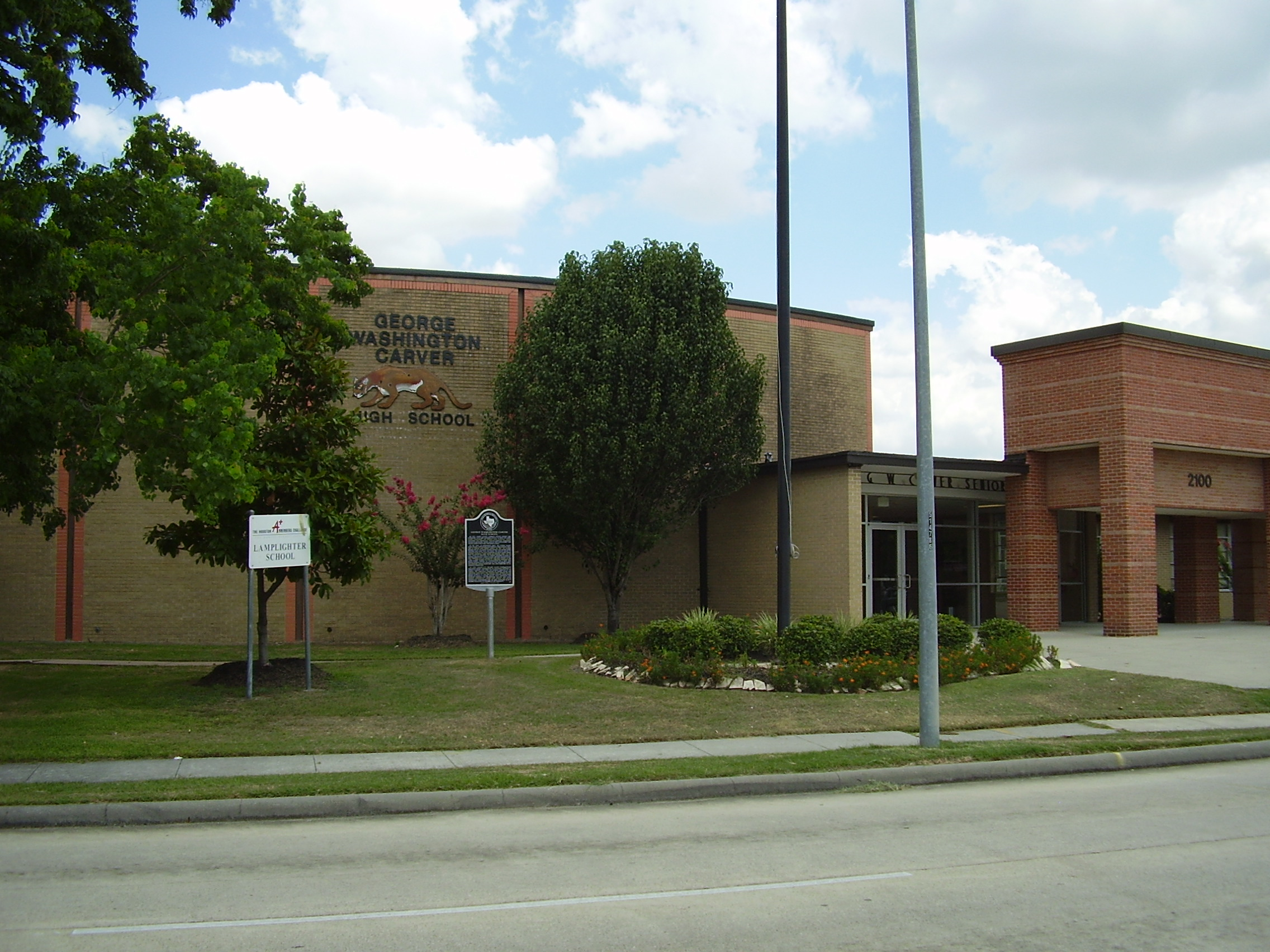
Carver High School

The western part of Acres Homes is in the Aldine Independent School District.

A portion of the Aldine ISD section of Acres Homes is zoned to Carver High School, while the other portion is served by Eisenhower High School.

In 1977 the Federal Government of the United States placed on Aldine ISD, asking it to desegregate several majority Black schools. Enacted in 1978, the plan required Aldine ISD to redraw the attendance boundaries of its schools so that no more than 30% of the students of each school were African-American. As a result, three schools in Acres Homes became 5-6 grade schools. Carver High School was no longer a zoned school and became a magnet school.

==== Klein Independent School District ====
A portion of the northern part of Acres Homes is within the Klein Independent School District and is served by Klein Forest High School.

==== Private schools ====
Houston Sudbury School is in Acres Homes.

=== Community colleges ===
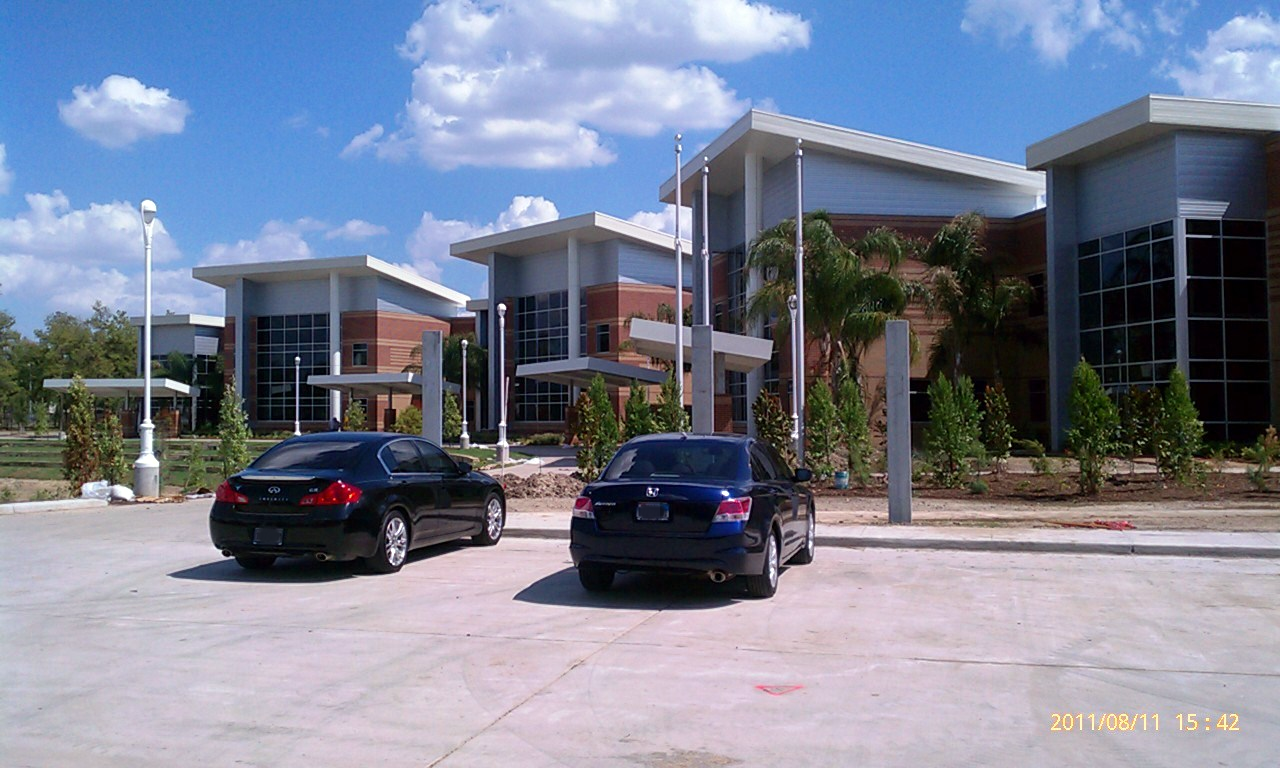
LSC-Victory Center

The Houston Community College serves the portions in Houston ISD.

Lone Star College System (formerly the North Harris Montgomery Community College District) serves the Aldine ISD portion. In 1972 residents of Aldine ISD and two other K-12 school districts voted to create the North Harris County College. The community college district began operations in the northern hemisphere fall of 1973.

The Victory Center of Lone Star College–North Harris is located in Acres Homes.

=== Public libraries ===
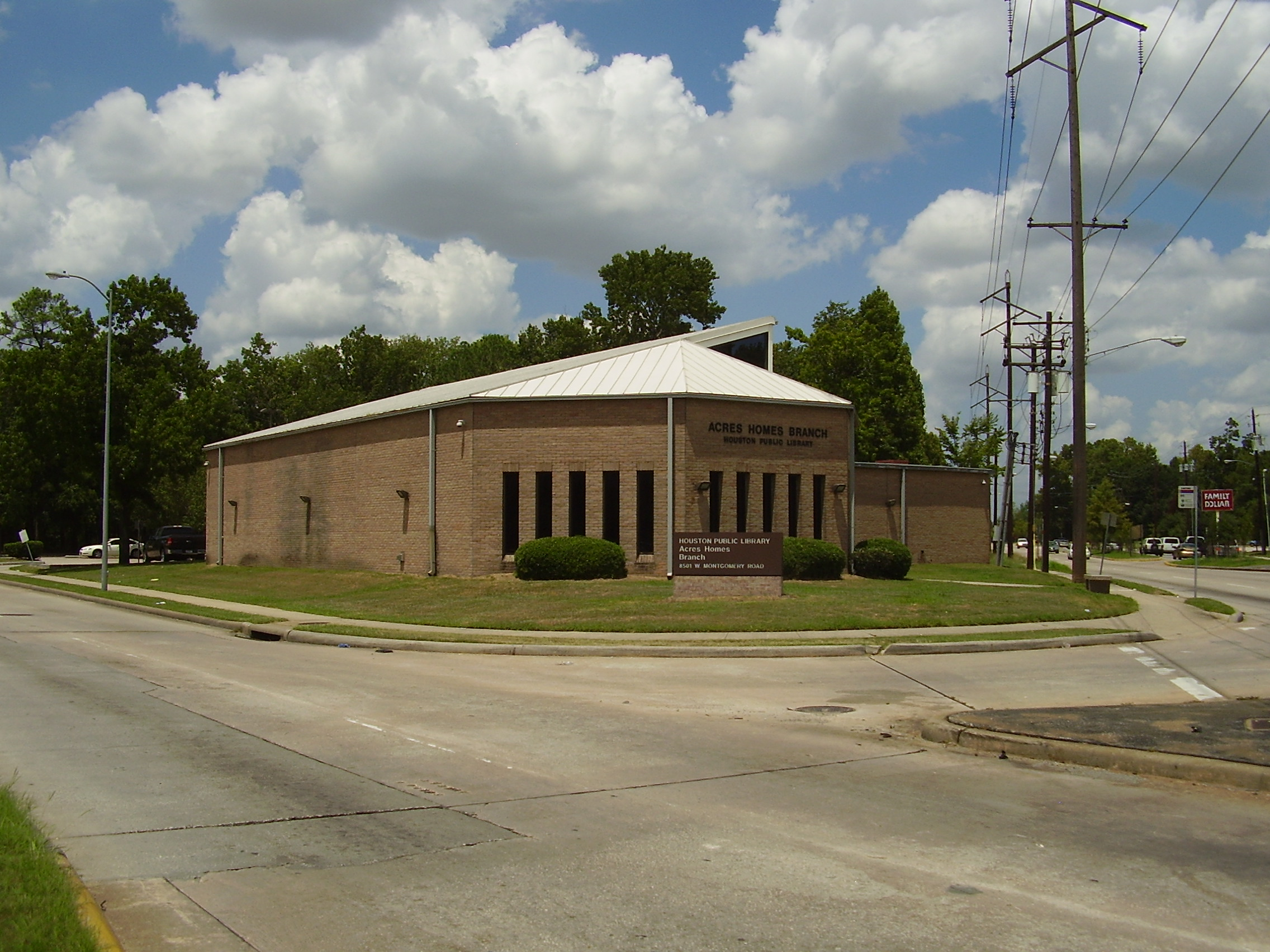
Acres Homes Neighborhood Library

The area is served by the Acres Homes Neighborhood Library of the Houston Public Library.

== Notable residents ==
- C.N. Love, newspaper publisher and civil rights activist, is buried at Paradise Cemetery in Acres Homes
- Sylvester Turner, elected Mayor of Houston in 2016 and former Texas House of Representatives member and Chairman of Budget and Oversight of the Regulated Industries Committee, grew up in Acres Homes and attended Klein High School, graduating as valedictorian of his senior class.
- Actress Loretta Devine grew up and attended grade school in Acres Homes.
- Rappers(rapper), Chamillionaire, Paul Wall, and Slim Thug grew up or lived in Acres Homes; singer/songwriter Johnny "Guitar" Watson lived in Acres Homes.
- Carl Crawford has a home in Acres Homes.
- Thaddeus S. Lott Sr., nationally renowned educator, was born and worked as an educator in Acres Homes.

== Gallery ==
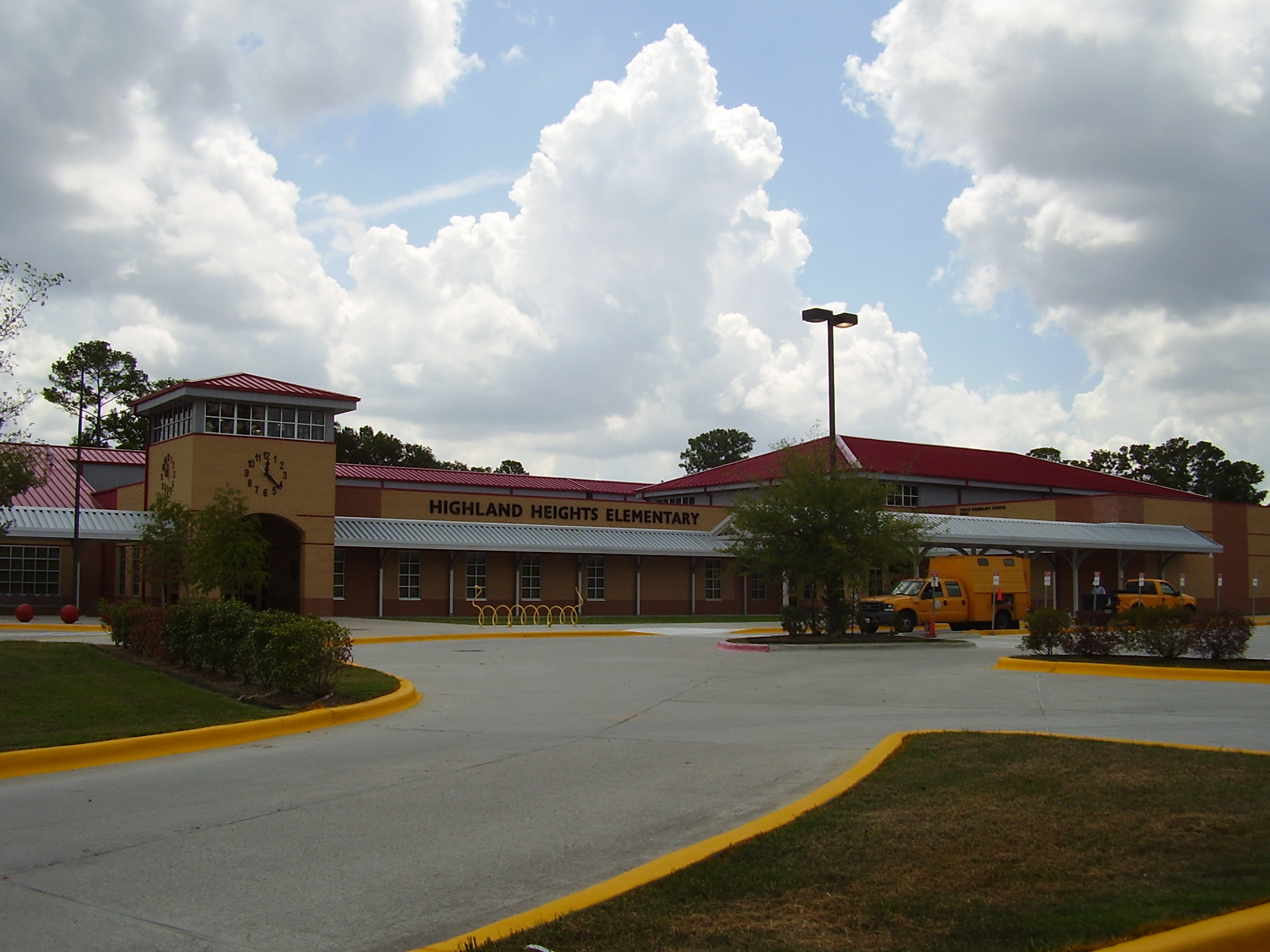
Highland Heights Elementary School

== See also ==
- History of the African-Americans in Houston
