= Airline, Texas =

Coordinates: 29.886580°N 95.392605°W

The Airline Improvement District is a management district in unincorporated Harris County, Texas, United States, in Greater Houston and is located entirely within the postal zip code of 77037.

Airline was originally a community, south of the community of Stuebner and west of the town of Aldine. The name appears on the 1907 postal map for Harris County. During the 79th Regular Session of the Texas Legislature, Texas House of Representatives member Kevin Bailey authored Bill #1458, which authorized the creation of the Airline Improvement District. The bill, sponsored by Texas Senate member Mario Gallegos, was signed into law. The district was created on June 17, 2005.

== Government and infrastructure ==
=== County government ===
The Airline Management District is served by Harris County Sheriff's Office District II Patrol, headquartered from the Humble Substation at 7900 Will Clayton Parkway in Humble. The Little York Volunteer Fire Department provides fire and EMS to unincorporated parts of the district.

== Transportation ==
In 2009 the Airline Improvement District planned to spend $2.9 million on improvements to pedestrian infrastructure to make it easier for pedestrians to walk to and from places in the area.

== Education ==
=== Primary and secondary schools ===
Some portions of the district are within the Aldine Independent School District, while some portions of the district are within the Houston Independent School District (HISD). Two Aldine ISD educational facilities, Carroll Academy, and Keeble EC/PK & Head Start Center, are within the district.

Early childhood/PreK/Kindergarten-centers serving sections of Airline include Hinojosa and Keeble. Elementary schools covering sections of the Aldine ISD portion of the management district include Carroll Academy, Bussey, Odom, Raymond, and Thompson. Middle schools covering sections of the Aldine ISD portion of the management district include Aldine, Grantham Academy, and Stovall. All of the Aldine ISD portion is zoned to Aldine Ninth Grade School and Aldine High School.

Previously Aldine ISD had separate intermediate schools for grades 5-6; intermediate schools covering sections of the Aldine ISD portion of the management district included Stehlik, Eckert, and Reed Academy. Previously a small portion was zoned to Nimitz High School.

Elementary schools serving sections of the HISD area include Barrick, Joe E. Moreno, and Osborne. Some portions of the HISD area are zoned to Fonville Middle School, while other portions are zoned to Henry Middle School. All portions within HISD are zoned to Sam Houston High School.

=== Colleges and universities ===
Residents in the Aldine ISD area are zoned to Lone Star College System, while residents in the Houston ISD area are zoned to Houston Community College.

== Parks and recreation ==
Harris County Precinct One operates Dow #2 Park in the management district. C. Milby Dow donated the land for the park in 1958; as a result the park was named after him. The park includes four baseball fields, an office, four press boxes, and toilet facilities. Arlene Nichols Memorial Park also services the area.

== Events ==
In 2009, 40,000 people per weekend arrived to the area to visit flea markets along Airline Drive.
