= Kinwood, Texas =

Unincorporated community in Texas, US

Coordinates: 29°54′43″N 95°18′09″W

Kinwood (formerly Kenwood) is an unincorporated community along U.S. Route 59 and the Southern Pacific Railroad in Harris County, Texas, United States, located four miles south of the city hall of Humble.

== History ==
Kenwood became Kinwood when the postmaster discovered that there was another community called Kenwood. State highway maps show that in 1936 Kinwood had a church, a sawmill, and several residences. A post office opened in 1945. In 1948 Kinwood had 156 residents. In 1952 Kinwood had one business. In 1958 Kinwood had two businesses. When the post office closed during that year, mail was delivered from Houston. In the 1980s the community had three churches and several residences.

== Education ==
Kinwood is zoned to schools in the Aldine Independent School District. Zoned schools include:

- Johnson Elementary School
- Escamilla Intermediate School
- Hambrick Middle School
- MacArthur High School
