= Thaddeus S. Lott Sr. =

American educator (1934–2015)

Personal details
- Born: May 30, 1934 Houston, Texas, U.S.
- Died: October 22, 2015 (aged 81) Houston, Texas, U.S.
- Education: Texas Southern University (BS, MEd); Liberty University (DA); Williams College (DHL)
- Occupation: Educator

Thaddeus Scott Lott Sr. (May 30, 1934 – October 22, 2015) was an American educator in Houston. Lott gained national attention in 1991 for his implementation of direct instruction at Mabel B. Wesley Elementary School of the Houston Independent School District.

== Early life and education ==
Lott was born and raised in Acres Homes. He earned a bachelor's degree and a master's degree in education from Texas Southern University. He also received honorary doctoral degrees from Liberty University and Williams College.

== Career ==
Lott began his career with the Houston Independent School District in 1959 at Highland Heights Elementary School. As Wesley Elementary's principal by 1975, test scores in reading comprehension improved to 85% from 18% in 1980 and 100% of third graders passed the reading portion of the Texas Assessment of Academic Skills by 1996. He achieved these results in large part by embracing direct instruction, a method of teaching that focuses on explicit instruction and the use of teacher scripts rather than more popular inquiry-based learning approaches.

In 1994, George W. Bush announced his then Texas gubernatorial campaign focus on education from Wesley, later conferring with Lott in the 1996 formation of the Texas Reading Initiative. Rod Paige, HISD superintendent in 1994, supported Lott by creating the first charter school system in Texas (Wesley, Highland Heights, and Osborne Elementary) under Lott's supervision. Lott retired from HISD in 2002.

== Controversy ==
In 1991, increasing test scores at Wesley received accusations of cheating from HISD and national attention from PrimeTime Live as well as the Oprah Winfrey Show. A 2005 HISD investigation into schools including Wesley Elementary, prompted by a report on abnormal TAKS test scores by the Dallas Morning News, returned no confirmation of cheating.

== Legacy ==
Lott was given the Jefferson Award for Public Service in 1998. Lott’s methods and achievements at Wesley motivated Baker Mitchell to found The Roger Bacon Academy in North Carolina, which has also implemented direct instruction. The Academy manages schools that replicate Lott’s model as embedded in an expression of classical traditions.

== See also ==
- History of African Americans in Houston
