= LaTonya Goffney =

American educative administrator

LaTonya M. Goffney

Superintendent of the Aldine Independent School District
- Incumbent
- Assumed office 2018
- Preceded by: Wanda Bamberg

Superintendent of the Lufkin Independent School District
- In office 2013–2018
- Succeeded by: Lynn Torres

Superintendent of the Coldspring-Oakhurst Consolidated Independent School District
- In office 2008–2013

Personal details
- Education: Sam Houston State University (BA, MEd, D.Ed)

LaTonya M. Goffney is the superintendent of the Aldine Independent School District (AISD), which serves nearly 70,000 students in North Houston and is one of the largest school districts in the state of Texas. She previously served as superintendent of the Lufkin Independent School District and the Coldspring-Oakhurst Consolidated Independent School District.

Early Life

LaTonya M. Goffney was born on December 17, 1976, in Coldspring, Texas. She was born to Debra McGowen Jackson and Frederick Brown.

LaTonya’s mother, Debra Jackson, is African American and worked as a CNA nurse. She is alive and well today. Her father, Frederick Brown, was also African American and has since passed away.

LaTonya grew up with siblings and extended family who played important roles throughout her life. Her biological younger sister is Shangra Jackson. On her father’s side, her siblings include Shannon Brown, who has passed away and is remembered in loving memory, as well as Lawana Brown, Frederick Brown, and Shontay L. Williams.

LaTonya’s story began under difficult circumstances. Her mother, Debra, was only 15 years old when she gave birth to LaTonya after experiencing sexual assault. From a very young age, LaTonya was exposed to hardships that no child should have to endure. Her mother was also in a domestic violence relationship that became so dangerous that she nearly lost her life.

Wanting to protect her daughters, Debra made the courageous decision to take them to her parents’ home, where she knew they would be safe. Although the family continued to face financial and personal struggles, LaTonya’s mother remained devoted to her children and continued helping her parents care for her daughters.

LaTonya’s childhood was often chaotic and filled with challenges, but school became a place where she felt safe. Education gave her a sense of stability and hope during difficult times. Her grandparents and family continuously encouraged her to pursue her education, dream bigger, and go farther in life.

Throughout LaTonya’s life, her mother, Debra Jackson, continued to support her from behind the scenes. She showed up for the important moments from high school graduations to college graduations and the many milestones in between. Her mother’s presence and support remained constant throughout the hardships they faced, LaTonya was never alone.

LaTonya’s early life was shaped by adversity, family, perseverance, and the belief that education could open doors to a better future.

== Education ==
Dr. Goffney earned a bachelor’s degree in history, a master’s degree in educational administration from Sam Houston State University, completing her doctorate in educational leadership at the same institution in 2011.

== Career ==
Dr. Goffney began her career in 1999 as a middle school language arts teacher in Coldspring-Oakhurst Consolidated Independent School District, the rural district near Sam Houston National Forest where she completed high school. She was named superintendent in 2008, and served in that position until 2013. A global education professional association, PDK International, named Dr. Goffney an Emerging Leader in 2012.

In 2013, Dr. Goffney became the superintendent of Lufkin Independent School District and she held that position until 2018. She was named Superintendent of the Year by the Texas Association of School Boards in 2017, the first Black woman to receive the award since it was first given in 1984. She was also the 2018 Texas nominee for the American Association of School Administrators National Superintendent of the Year award. Dr. Goffney joined Aldine ISD as superintendent in 2018, the first Black person to hold that position, serving the most students among female superintendents in Texas. In 2019, she was awarded the Sam Houston State University Distinguished Alumni Award, named VYPE Magazine Administrator of the Year, and a finalist for the American Association of School Administrators (AASA) Women In School Leadership Award.

In addition to her work as a district leader, Dr. Goffney is involved with many professional and community organizations. In 2020, she joined the Board of Directors for the Greater Houston Partnership, which serves over 1,100 member companies spread among twelve counties in the Houston area. She is a member of the Texas and National Alliances of Black School Educators, Texas Academic Decathlon Board, TASA Future-Ready Superintendents, Chiefs for Change, Alpha Kappa Alpha sorority, and the Texas Council of Women School Executives.
