= Campbell Center =

Building in Houston, Texas, United States

Coordinates: 29°55′56″N 95°21′35″W

M.O. Campbell Educational Center
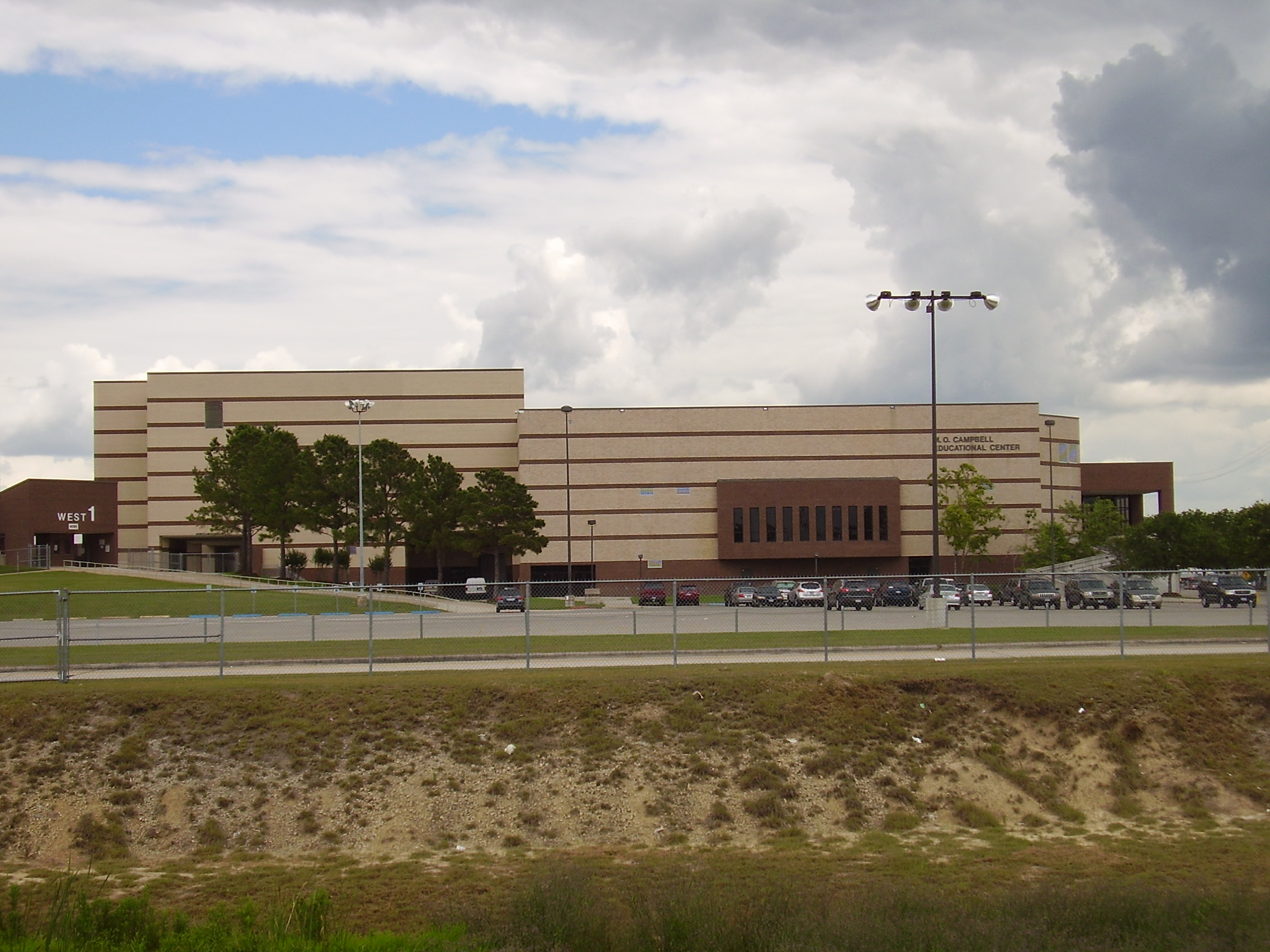
- Interactive map of M.O. Campbell Educational Center
- Location: 1865 Aldine-Bender Road; Houston, Texas 77032
- Owner: Aldine Independent School District
- Capacity: 7,000 (est.)
- Surface: Robbins BioCushion hardwood floor for basketball and volleyball
- Scoreboard: four-sided, center-mounted

Construction
- Opened: 1996

Tenants
- Aldine Mustangs; Davis Falcons; Eisenhower Eagles; MacArthur Generals; Nimitz Cougars

The M.O. Campbell Educational Center is an indoor arena in Houston, Texas. The facility serves as the home basketball and volleyball court for the five high schools in the Aldine Independent School District (AISD). The Campbell Center is also used for graduations, theatrical performances, meetings, conferences, banquets and community events.

The arena seats 7,000 people and is located on Aldine-Bender Road just south of Beltway 8, a short distance from George Bush Intercontinental Airport and Greenspoint Mall. It is named for M.O. Campbell, who served as AISD superintendent from 1973 to 1986 and who is credited with moving the district to a cash-basis operation.

The Campbell Center has hosted many events in its history, including the men's and women's Southland Conference collegiate basketball tournament, the Houston vs. the Nation high school basketball tournament (formerly the Academy National Invitational), the Texas Class 4A and 5A Region III high school basketball playoffs, the Class 5A high school Region III volleyball playoffs, and the University Interscholastic League state powerlifting tournament.
