= Benjamin O. Davis High School =

Public school in Texas, United States

Location
- 12525 Ella Blvd. Houston, Texas 77067-2407; United States
- 29.95457°N 95.43308°W\

Information
- School type: Public high school
- Established: 2012
- School district: Aldine Independent School District
- Principal: Anthony Watkins , Josh Nation (for 9th grade)
- Staff: 166.52 (FTE)
- Grades: 10-12 (A few ninth grade students also attend select classes at Davis High School)
- Enrollment: 3,093 (2022-23)
- Student to teacher ratio: 18.57
- Colors: Red, Navy & White
- Athletics conference: UIL Class AAAAAA
- Mascot: Falcons
- Rival: Eisenhower High School
- Website: Davis High School

Benjamin O. Davis High School is a public high school located in unincorporated Harris County, Texas, USA, near Houston, and a part of the Aldine Independent School District.

It is classified as a 6A school by the UIL. In 2019, the school received a C grade from the Texas Education Agency.

== History and naming ==
The school opened in 2012, and was named after Benjamin O. Davis, Jr., the commander of the Tuskegee Airmen.

== Academics ==
For the 2018–2019 school year, Davis High School received a C grade from the Texas Education Agency, with an overall score of 77 out of 100. The school received a C grade in two domains, Student Achievement (score of 71) and Closing the Gaps (score of 71), and a B grade in School Progress (score of 80) The school did not receive any of the seven possible distinction designations.

== Athletics ==
The Davis Falcons compete in these sports:

Volleyball, Cross Country, Football, Basketball, Swimming, Water Polo, Soccer, Golf, Tennis, Track, Baseball & Softball

== Demographics ==
In the 2018–2019 school year, there were 2,528 students. 31.7% were African American, 3.1% were Asian, 61.4% were Hispanic, 0.2% were American Indian, 0.1% were Pacific Islander, 2.5% were White, and 1.0% were two or more races. 81.0% of students were Economically Disadvantaged, 16.8% were English Language Learners, and 7.1% received Special Education services.
