= Aldine Independent School District =

School district in Texas, United States

Location
- 2520 W.W. Thorne Blvd. Houston, TX 77073 ESC Region 4 United States
- Coordinates: 29°56′5″N 95°21′21″W

District information
- Type: Independent school district
- Motto: My Aldine
- Grades: Pre-K through 12
- Established: 1935
- Superintendent: LaTonya M Goffney
- Schools: 80
- Budget: $982,566,000 (2016–2017)
- NCES District ID: 4807710

Students and staff
- Students: 56,500 (2024–2025)
- Teachers: 3,963.73 (on an FTE basis) (2023–2024)
- Staff: 5,244.20 (on an FTE basis) (2023–2024)
- Student–teacher ratio: 14.59 (2023–2024)

Other information
- Website: www.aldineisd.org

The Aldine Independent School District is a public school district based in unincorporated Harris County, Texas, United States. It serves portions of Houston and unincorporated Harris County. Aldine ISD serves the communities of Aldine, most of Greenspoint, most of East Aldine, and portions of Airline, Acres Homes, Kinwood, Bordersville, and Inwood Forest. The district is part of the taxation base for the Lone Star College System. As of 2020, Dr. LaTonya Goffney serves as superintendent of schools.

== History ==
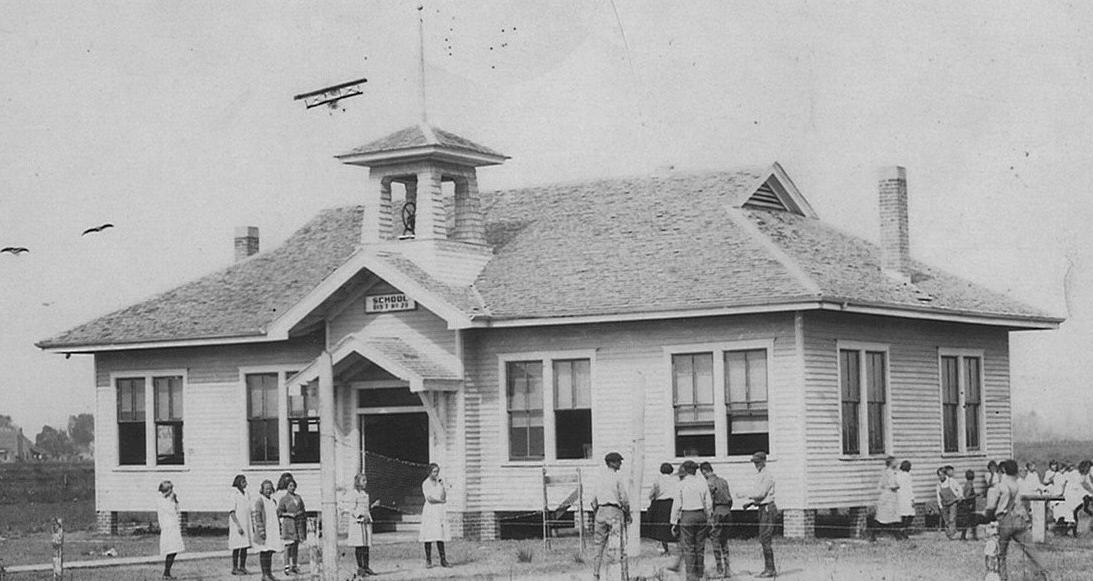
Aldine School House in 1921

In 1876, after a series of new education laws, Harris County authorized the creation of several school communities. Harris County School Community No. 1, the Westfield School Community, was established by W. L. Higgs, H. Illonefield and James McLeod on September 30, 1876. Harris County School Community No. 13, the Durdin School Community, was established by G. L. Durdin, Pleasant Smith Humble, and H. Smith on December 22, 1876. On November 18, 1881, the trustees of Westfield Community No. 1 (H. Tautenhahn, Redding Jackson and S. Yarborough) were authorized to sell off the old school house and one acre of land to pay for the construction of a new school house. In 1883, 38 students were being educated in the Westfield community, and 20 students in the Higgs community.

On June 18, 1884, the Harris County Commissioners Court consolidated the local school communities (Higgs and Westfield) into one school district: Harris County Common School District 29. A single three-person board directed activities of the district for four decades. On February 19, 1910, a schoolhouse bond of $8,000 (for constructing and equipping a public free school building of wood material) was passed by the citizens. In 1912–1913, District 29 had three intermediate schools (grades 1–7): Aldine, Westfield and Higgs. It also had one high school that educated students in grades 8 and 9: Hartwell. The Westfield school was closed for the 1913–1914 school year.

On June 18, 1932, District 29 residents voted 123-44 for a $40,000 bond to consolidate the four schoolhouses for white students (Aldine, Brubaker, Higgs and Westfield) into one new centralized school. This two-story brick building would contain 12 classrooms and an auditorium. It would house grades 1-7 and allow the district to offer high school classes (grades 8 and 9) for the first time since the Hartwell School had closed. When the 1932–33 school year began, high school students met at Memorial Baptist Church, located at East Montgomery Road (today's Airline Drive) and Gulf Bank. The new, as yet unnamed school opened in February 1933 at the intersection of Aldine-Bender Road and Aldine Westfield and immediately was filled to capacity. District 29 added grades 10 and 11 in 1933–34 to complete what was then considered a full high school program. On May 25, 1934, the now-christened S.M.N. Marrs School graduated its first class, consisting of nine students. S. M. N. Marrs was named for Starlin Marion Newberry Marrs, who served as the state superintendent of public instruction for Texas from 1923 to 1932. Roughly a year later, in the spring of 1935, District 29 absorbed part of Common School District 49, also known as the North Houston District.

Marrs High School in 1940

On May 4, 1935, voters in Common School District 29 approved creation of the Aldine Independent School District by a 128 to 28 margin. With the S.M.N. Marrs School filled to capacity, Aldine ISD voters approved 57-14 a $25,000 bond for construction of a new 10-classroom junior/senior high school building on September 7, 1935. This new building opened in 1936 next door to the Marrs School on Aldine-Westfield Road. It too was named S.M.N. Marrs. Aldine ISD acquired part of Common School District 26, also known as the White Oak District, in 1937. This added portions of Acres Homes to Aldine ISD. Included was the White Oak School, which became the district's school for black students. In the spring of 1948, Aldine ISD opened another high school located immediately to the north of S.M.N. Marrs High. This school was named Aldine High School, after the nearby community. The former Marrs High School was turned into a junior high school.

On November 24, 1954, the main building of Aldine High School was destroyed by a six-alarm fire. A new high school campus was built in 1956 at 11101 Airline Drive at West Road on the site of the former Gulf Coast Airport. As of January 1, 1956 Aldine ISD still included parts of Oak Forest, the area north of Brickhouse Gully and West of White Oak Bayou, Katherine Smith Elementary was part of Aldine ISD. In 1958 residents in Oak Forest complained to the Harris County School Board that Aldine wasn't doing enough for their area and they wanted out, Houston ISD schools were closer was a reason given. On September 17, 1958, the county school board ruled for the residents and said Aldine ISD had to cede 3 square miles of Oak Forest and Langwood to HISD.

=== Desegregation ===
In 1964, George Franklin Sampson attempted to enroll his children at Aldine High School. The district denied his request and informed him that his children were required to attend Carver High School, the district's black school. Sampson filed a lawsuit against the district, Sampson and the United States v. Aldine Independent School District, arguing that Aldine ISD's separate schools for black students were illegal. The court ruled in favor of Sampson, requiring the district to integrate its schools.

In 1977, although Aldine ISD was almost 75% white, the district still had several schools which were all black. As a result, the district was placed under a federal court order to redraw attendance zones so that every school in 1978 would have less than 30% black enrollment. For each subsequent year, the order required that black enrollment at every school remain within 15% of the district average, and the percentage of black teachers at each school must be within 5% of the district average at primary schools and 10% at secondary schools. The court order was removed on December 5, 2002.

=== Controversy ===
The district came under outrage when it was learned that an 11-year-old student had repeatedly sexually assaulted a 6-year-old student on a school bus for months in 2022 news, broke out in 2023.

In 2023 the Aldine ISD Board of Trustees voted unanimously to use the power of eminent domain to seize the home of Travis Upchurch, 79 years old and lifelong Aldine resident, to expand their high school football stadium parking lot. The property has been in Upchurch's family since 1916 and has housed five generations, including his great grandfather and his children. After months of his family and the community fighting the district dropped their pursuit, conveniently right before elections where a majority of the board's seats were being contested. This story made national news including the New York Times and the Bobby Bones Show as well as making it in the news in Africa, Australia and Hawaii.

== Recognition ==
Aldine ISD received the Broad Prize for Urban Education in 2009 and was a finalist for the award in 2004, 2005, and 2008. The district received a Magna Award in 1999 from the American School Board Journal for its "Benchmark Targets for Academic Achievement" program. The school board was listed as the Outstanding School Board by the Texas Association of School Administrators in 1973 and 1998, and was listed as an Honor Board in 2013.

== Demographics ==
For the 2020–2021 school year, Aldine ISD had a total enrollment of 63,146 students. 91.6% of students were economically disadvantaged, 39.0% were English Language Learners, and 9.0% received Special Education Services.

Ethnic Distribution

- 22.7% African American
- 1.1% Asian
- 72.7% Hispanic
- 0.3% American Indian
- 0.2% Pacific Islander
- 0.7% Two or More Races
- 2.4% White

== Finances ==
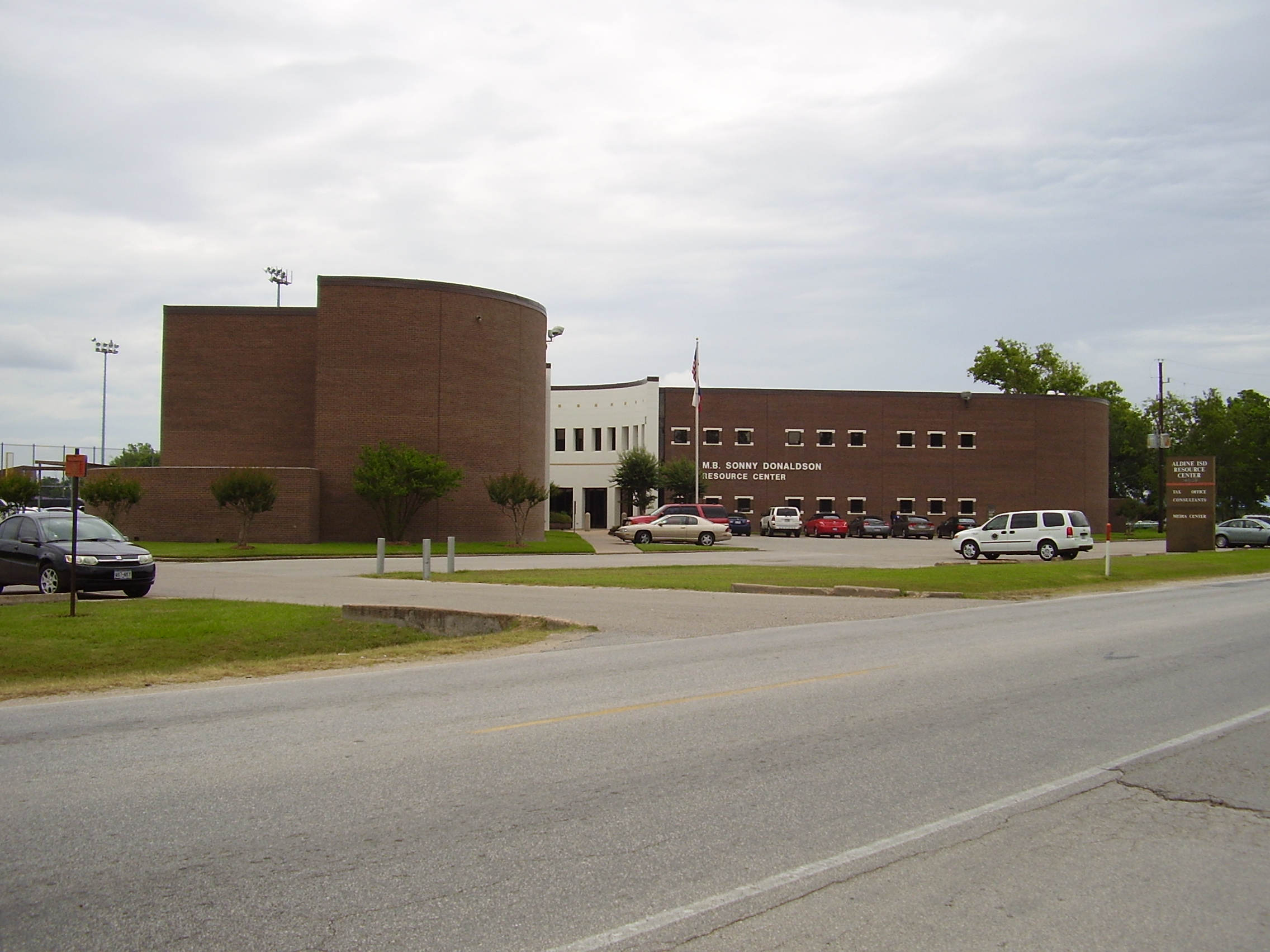
M. B. Sonny Donaldson Resource Center

For the 2016–2017 school year, the district had $724,918,000 in total revenue, $982,566,000 in total expenditures, and spent $14,083 per student.

== Academics ==
For each school year, the Texas Education Agency rates school district performance based on statistical data. From 1996 to 2011, the agency rated school districts as either Exemplary, Recognized, Academically Acceptable, or Academically Unacceptable. The district was rated Academically Acceptable in 1996 and Recognized from 1997 to 2002. School districts did not receive a rating for the 2002–2003 school year as the agency transitioned from using the Texas Assessment of Academic Skills (TAAS) to the Texas Assessment of Knowledge and Skills (TAKS) standardized test. The district was rated Academically Acceptable every year from 2004 to 2011. School districts did not receive a rating for the 2011–2012 school year as the agency transitioned from using the TAKS to the State of Texas Assessments of Academic Readiness (STAAR) as the basis for their accountability ratings.

From 2013 to 2017, the agency rated school districts as either Met Standard, Met Alternative Standard, or Improvement Required. Aldine ISD received a rating of Met Standard for every year under this system.

Beginning in 2017–2018, the agency calculates a score for each district from 0 to 100 which is used to assign a grade from A to F. For the 2017–2018 school year, Aldine ISD received an overall score of 76, but did not receive a rating from the agency due to the impact of Hurricane Harvey. The district received a score of 83 and a B grade in 2018–2019. The district did not receive a rating for 2019–2020 or 2020–2021 due to the COVID-19 pandemic.

== Schools ==
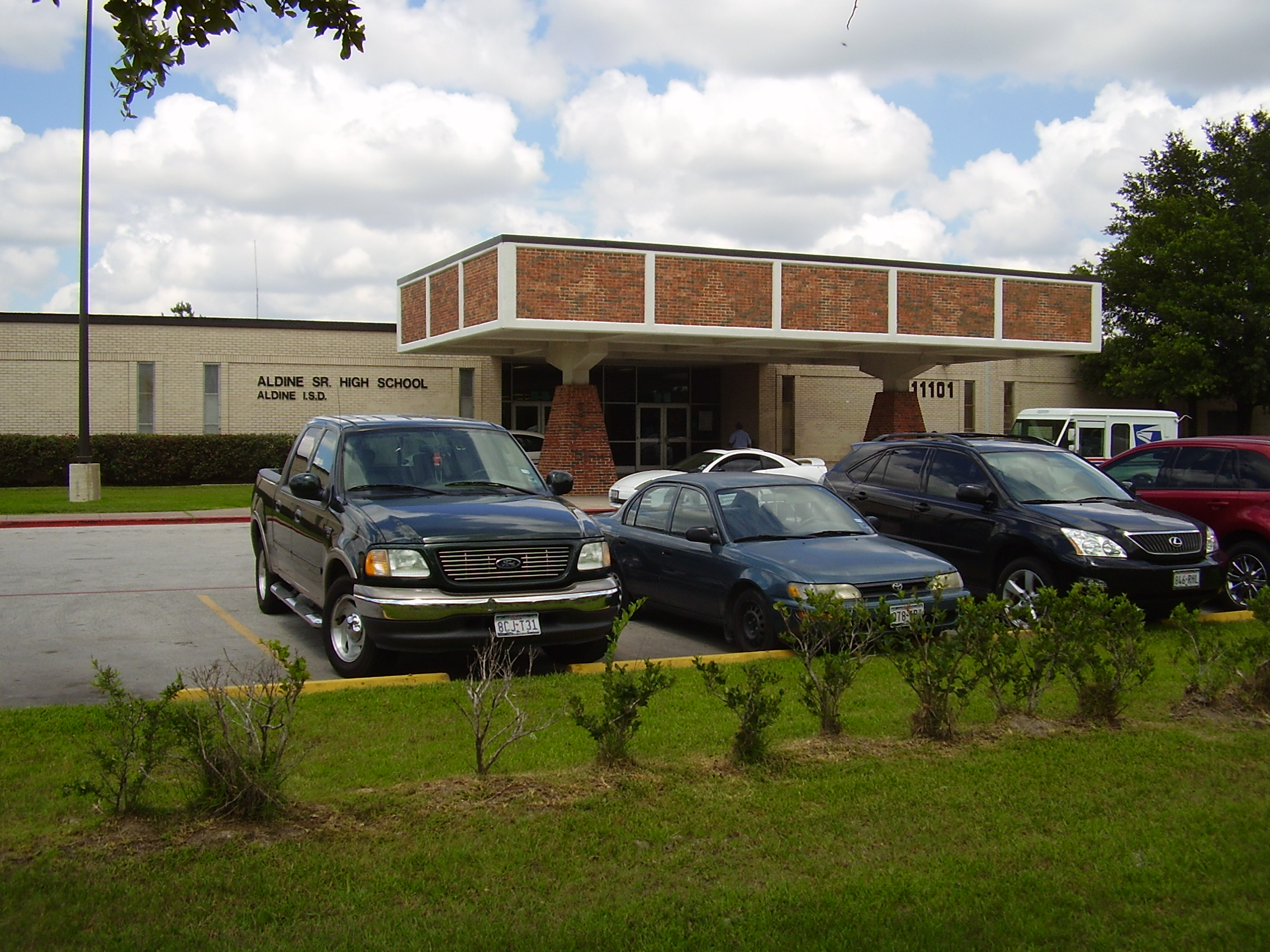
Aldine High School

=== Alternative schools ===
- Young Women's Leadership Academy
- Lane School (Unincorporated) (Early Childhood–12)
- Impact Leadership Academy (1-8)
- Knippel Education Center (KEC) (Unincorporated) (2–12)
- Hall Success Academy, (Opened 1995) (Unincorporated)
- Dr. Archie Blanson Career and Technical Education High School (9-12)
- La Promesa (9-12)(Established 2021)

=== Secondary schools ===
==== High schools ====
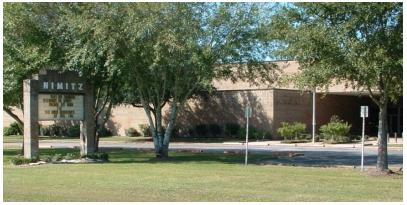
Nimitz High School

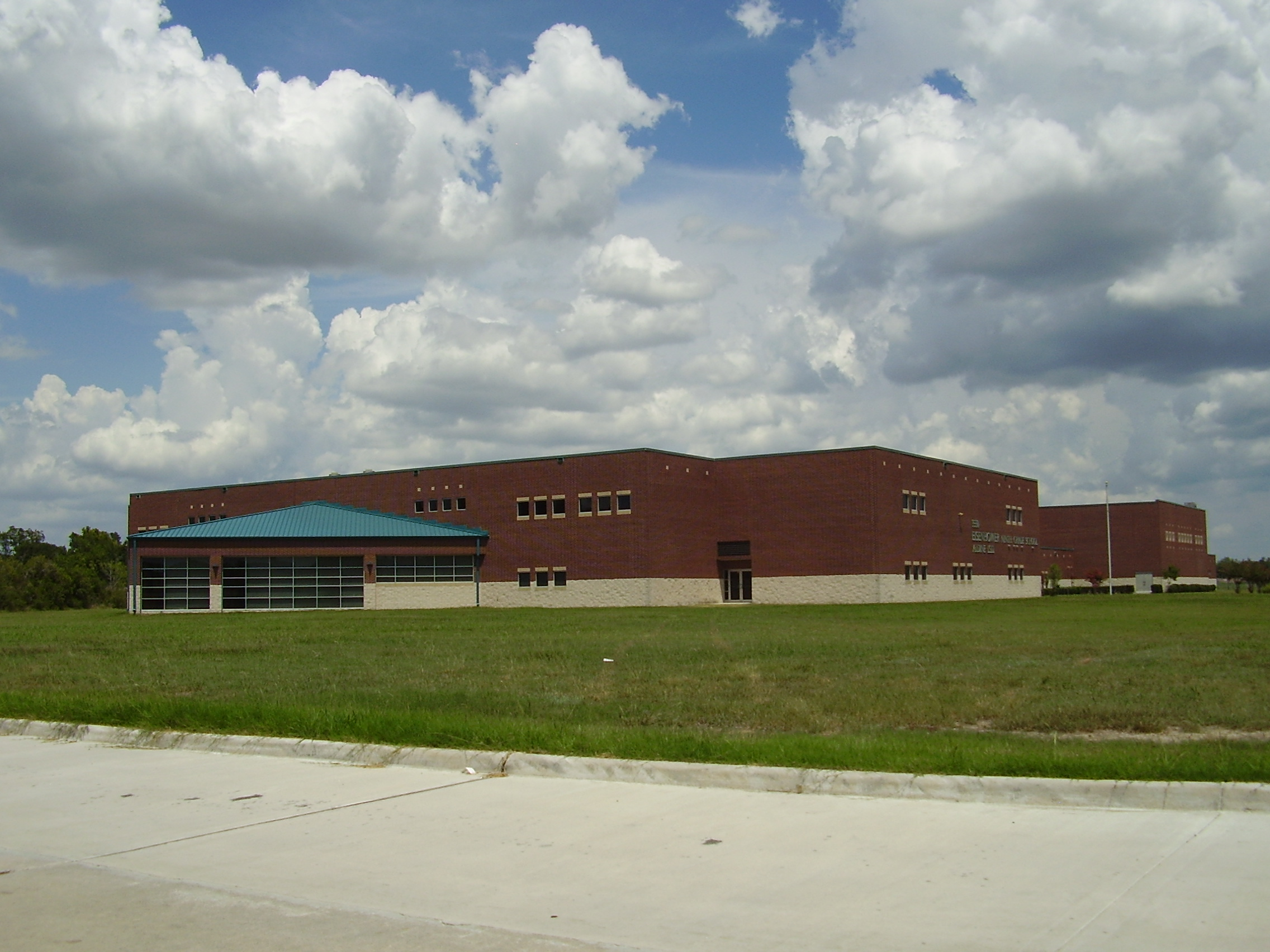
Eisenhower Ninth Grade School

===== Senior High Schools (10–12) =====
- Aldine Senior High School(Mustangs) (Established 1932. Present campus opened 1956) (Houston)
- Blanson CTE High School (Opened 2018)
- Carver High School, home of the Panthers (Houston)
- Davis Senior High School (Falcons)(Opened 2012) (Unincorporated)
- Eisenhower Senior High School (Eagles)(Opened 1972) (Houston)
- MacArthur Senior High School (Opened 1965) (Unincorporated)
- Nimitz Senior High School(Cougars) (Opened 1978) (Unincorporated)
- Victory Early College High School, home of the Vikings (Houston)
- YES Prep @ Eisenhower High School (Houston, Charter)(Eagles)(opened 2016, closed in 2023)
  - The school used Eisenhower High School as a host campus
- Rose M Avalos PTECH High School

(Opened in 2018)

===== Ninth Grade Schools (9) =====
- Aldine Ninth Grade School (Mustangs)(Opened 1998) (Houston)
- Eisenhower Ninth Grade School (Eagles) (Opened 1999) (Houston)
- Douglas MacArthur Ninth Grade School (Opened 2000) (Unincorporated)
- Nimitz Ninth Grade School (Cougars)(Opened 2000) (Unincorporated)
- Davis Ninth Grade School (Falcons)(Opened 2012)
- Eisenhower 9th College Prep (Opened 2023)

==== Middle Schools (6–8) ====
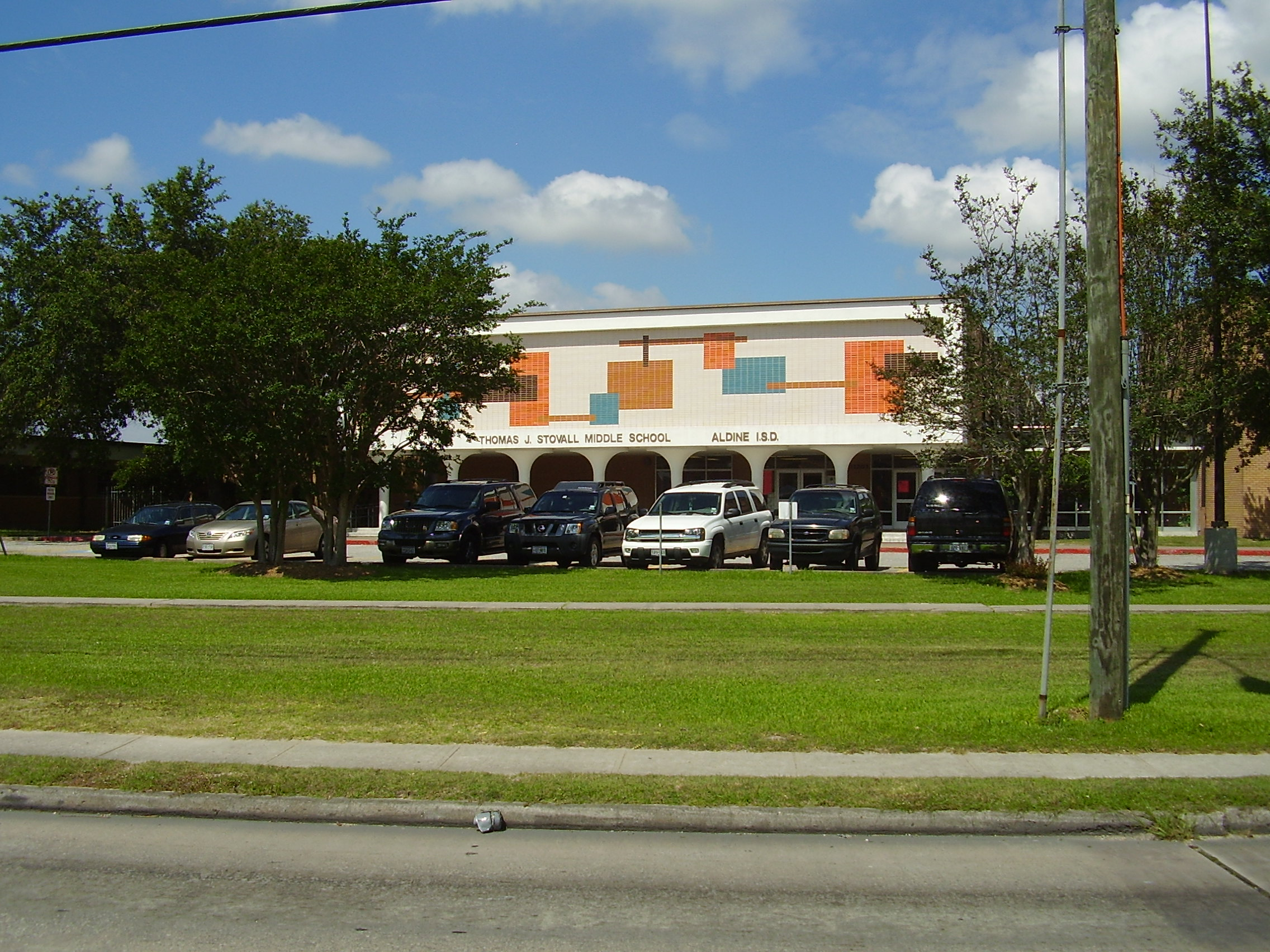
Thomas J. Stovall Middle School

- Aldine Middle School (Colts)(Unincorporated)
- Drew Academy (Badgers) (Opened 1963)(Alternative school from 1978 to 1995) (Houston)
- Garcia Middle School (Ravens)(Unincorporated) (Opened 2018)
- Grantham Academy (Panthers) (Unincorporated)
- Hambrick Middle School (Hawks) (Opened 1961)(Unincorporated)
- Hoffman Middle School (Hornets) (Houston)
- Jones Middle School (Toros) (‘’Opened 2018’’)
- Lewis Middle School (Lions) (Opened 2010) (Unincorporated)
- Mead Middle School (Jaguars) (‘’Opened 2018’’)
- Plummer Middle School (Pumas)(Opened 2005) (Unincorporated)
- Shotwell Middle School (Sharks)(Unincorporated)(Opened 1972)
- Thomas J. Stovall Middle School (Steers)(Opened 1964)(Houston)
  - National Blue Ribbon School '90-'91
- Teague Middle School (Trojans)(Unincorporated)
- Hoffman College Prep (Houston,)
- YES Prep @ Hoffman (2013-2022)
  - The school uses Hoffman Middle School as a host campus. YES Prep Hoffman used the campus as a host campus as well.

=== Primary schools ===
==== Former Intermediate Schools–Now Elementary Schools (5–6) ====
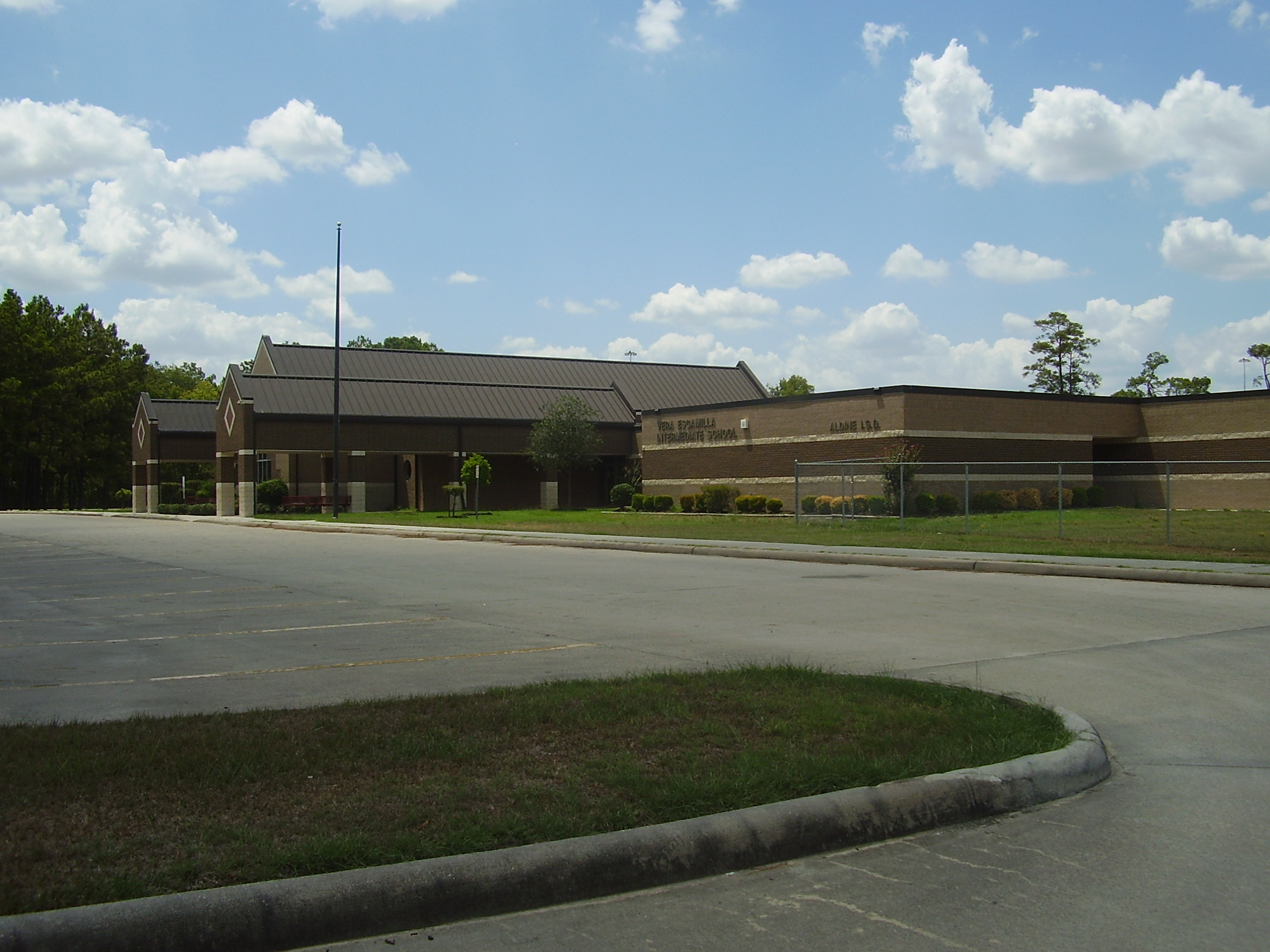
Escamilla Elementary School

- Houston Academy ( ONLY INTERMEDIATE SCHOOL)(Opened 2002) (Houston)
- Reed Academy (Opened 1995) (Unincorporated)
- Stehlik Elementary School (Opened 1994) (Unincorporated)
- Impact Leadership Academy at Wilson (Formerly Wilson Elementary and Opened 1993) (Unincorporated)

==== Elementary schools (1–5) ====
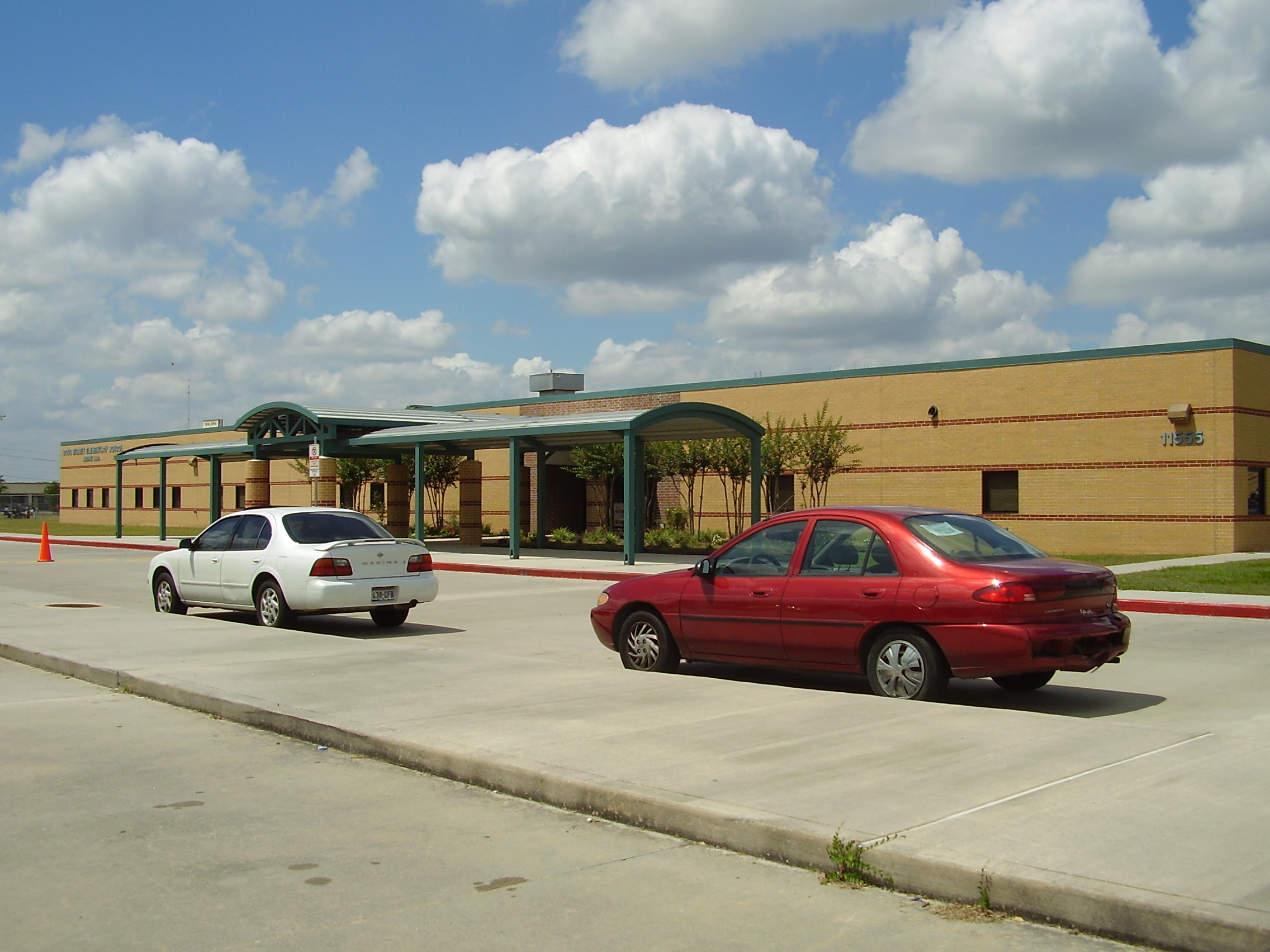
Bussey Elementary School

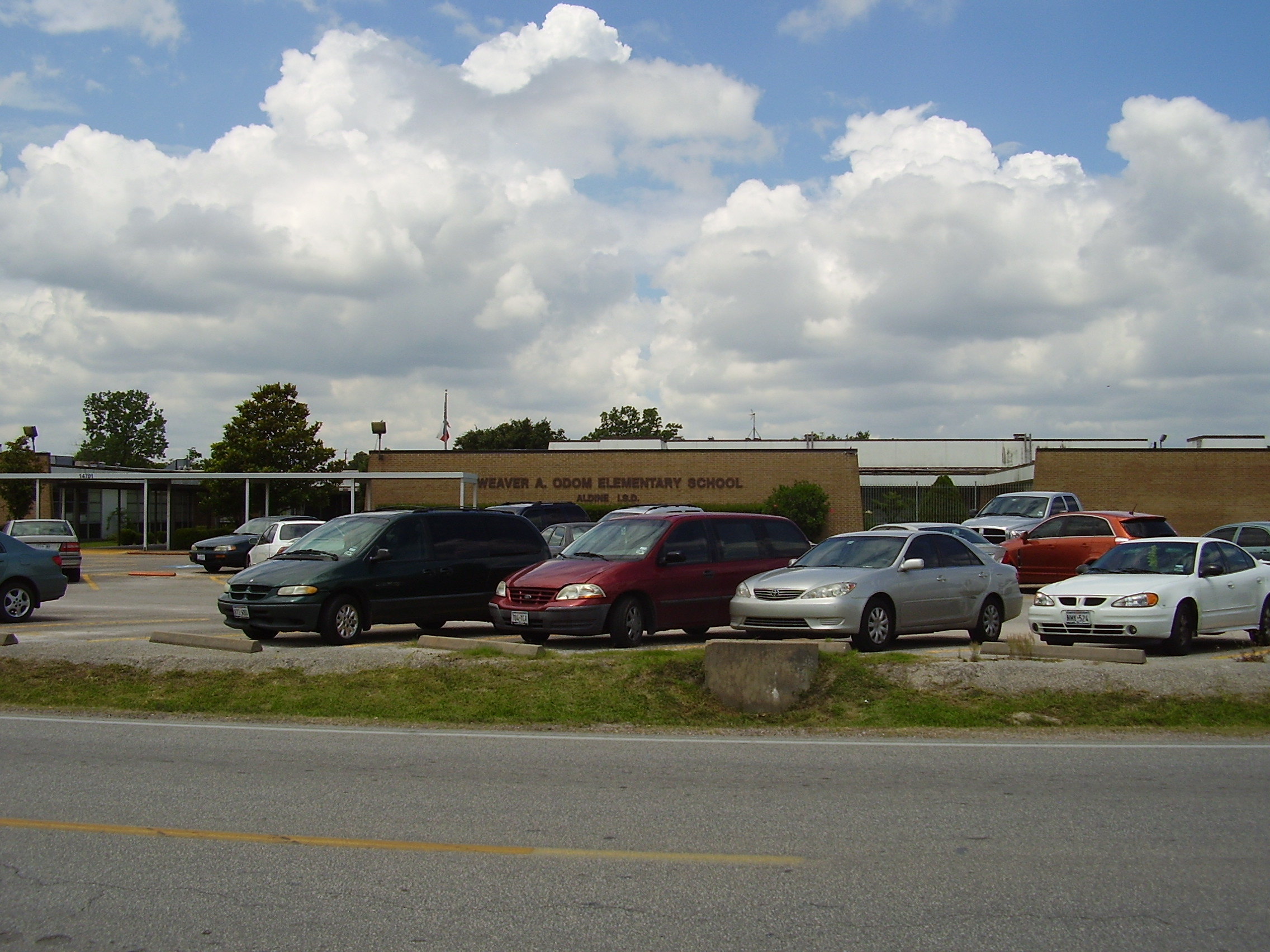
Odom Elementary School

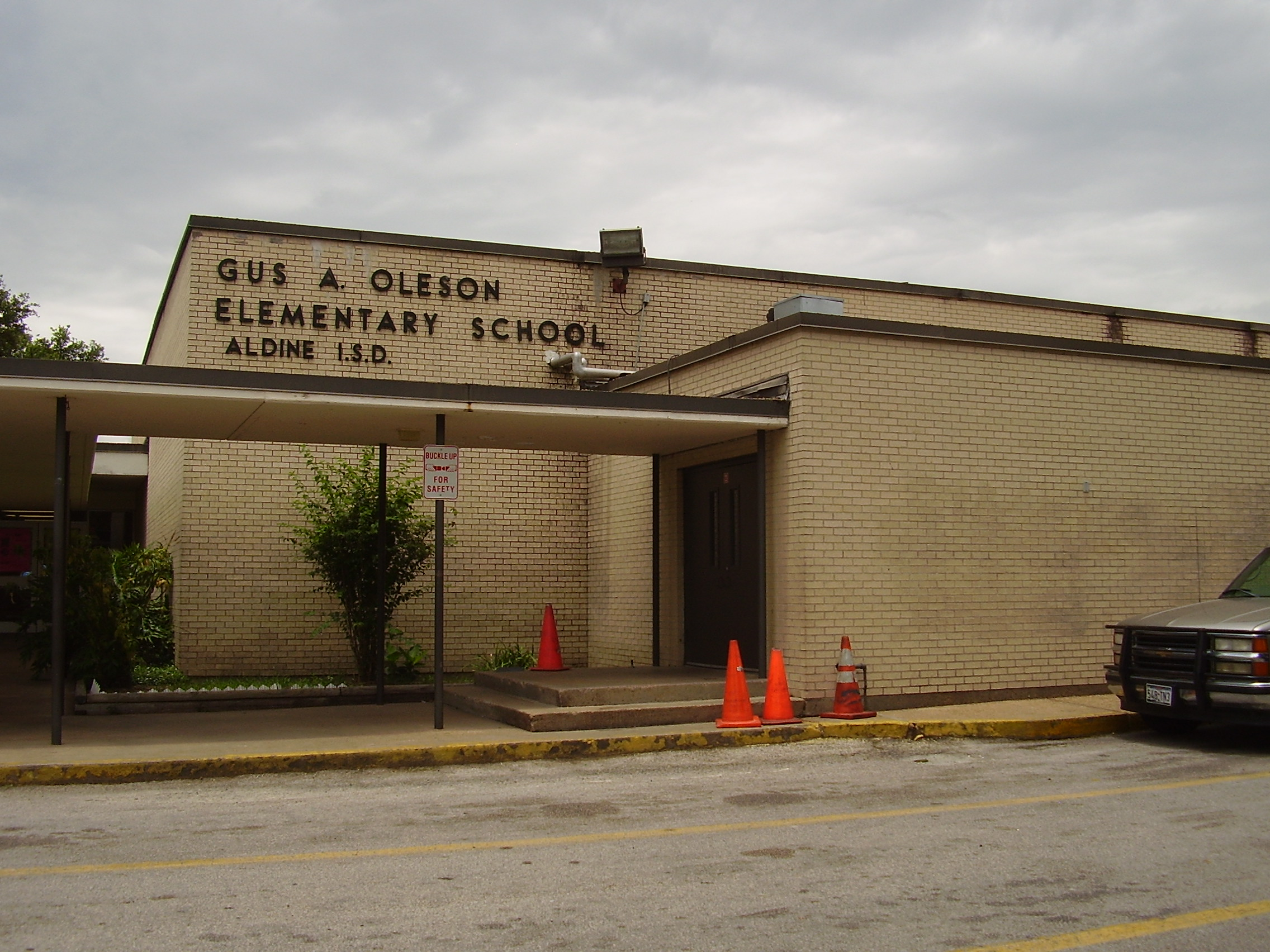
Oleson Elementary School

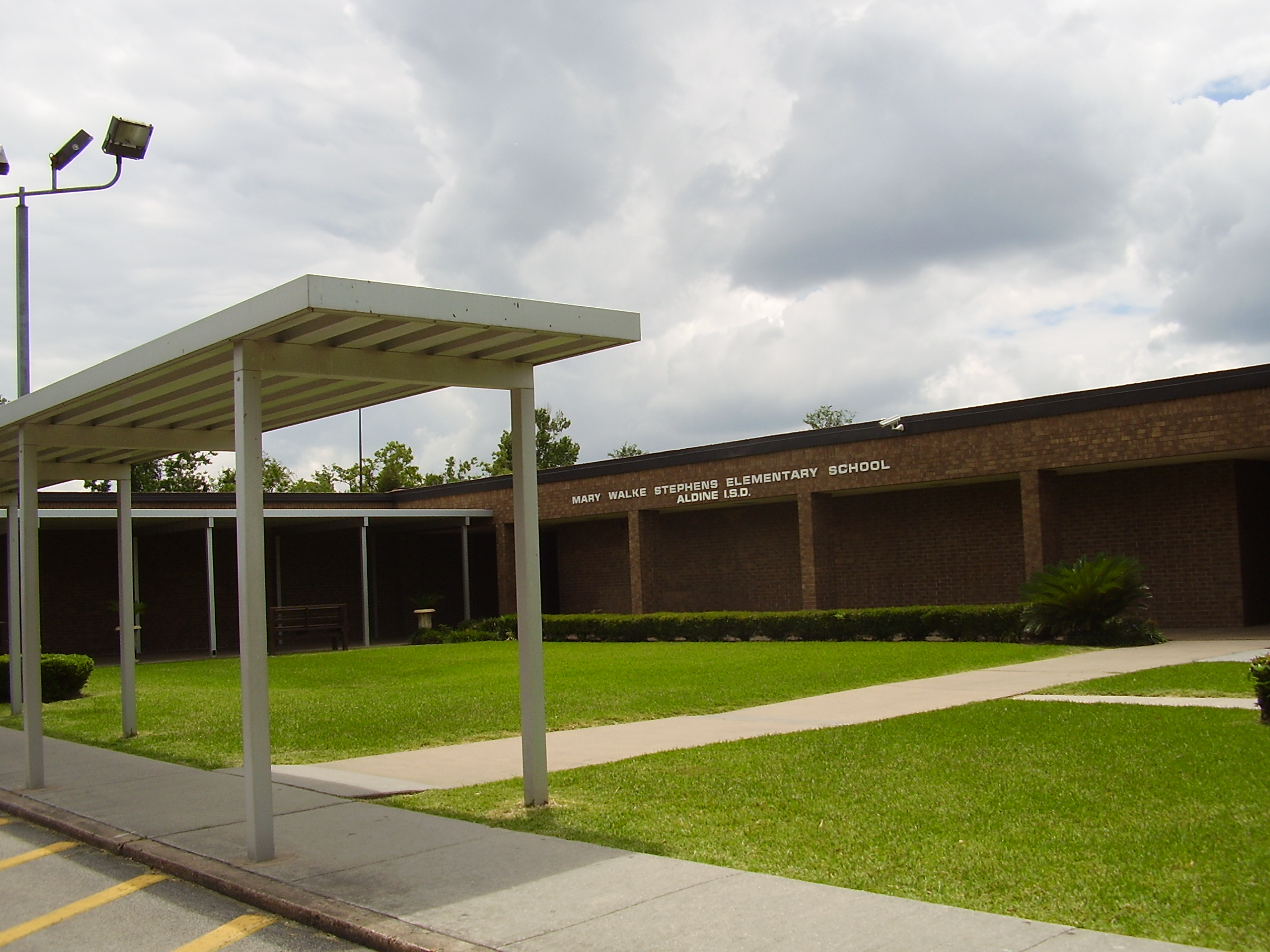
Stephens Elementary School

- Kujawa Elementary School (FKA: Aldine Elementary School) (Opened 2004) (Unincorporated)
- Spence Elementary School (Opened 2005) (Unincorporated)
- Thompson Elementary School (Houston)

===== 1–5 =====
- Black Elementary School (Houston)
- Bussey Elementary School (Opened 2004) (Houston)
- Calvert Elementary School (Opened 1992) (Unincorporated)
- Caraway Elementary School (Opened 1993) (Houston)
- Carmichael Elementary School (Unincorporated)
- Carroll Academy (Unincorporated)
- Carter Academy (Opened 1999, Unincorporated)
- Cypresswood Elementary School (Opened 2015) (Humble)
- Dunn Elementary School (Unincorporated)
- Ermel Elementary School (Houston)
- Escamilla Elementary School (Opened 1994) (Unincorporated)
- Francis Elementary School (Unincorporated)
- Goodman Elementary (FKA: Hidden Valley Elementary School) (Opened 1964) (Houston)
- Greenspoint Elementary School (opened 2016) (Houston)
- Harris Elementary School (Opened 2000) (Houston)
- Hill Elementary School (FKA: Northwest Intermediate School) (Opened 2002) (Unincorporated)
- Johnson Elementary School (Unincorporated)
- Jones Elementary School (Opened 2008) (Unincorporated)
- Marcella Elementary School (Opened fall 2007) (Houston)
- Ogden Elementary School
- Odom Elementary School (Unincorporated)
- Orange Grove Elementary School (Unincorporated)
- Reed Academy (Houston)
- Stephens Elementary School (Unincorporated)
- Bill Worsham Elementary School (Unincorporated)

===== 1–4 =====
- Anderson Academy (Houston)

===== PK–K =====
- Reece Pre-K – K Academy (Houston)

=== Early childhood schools ===
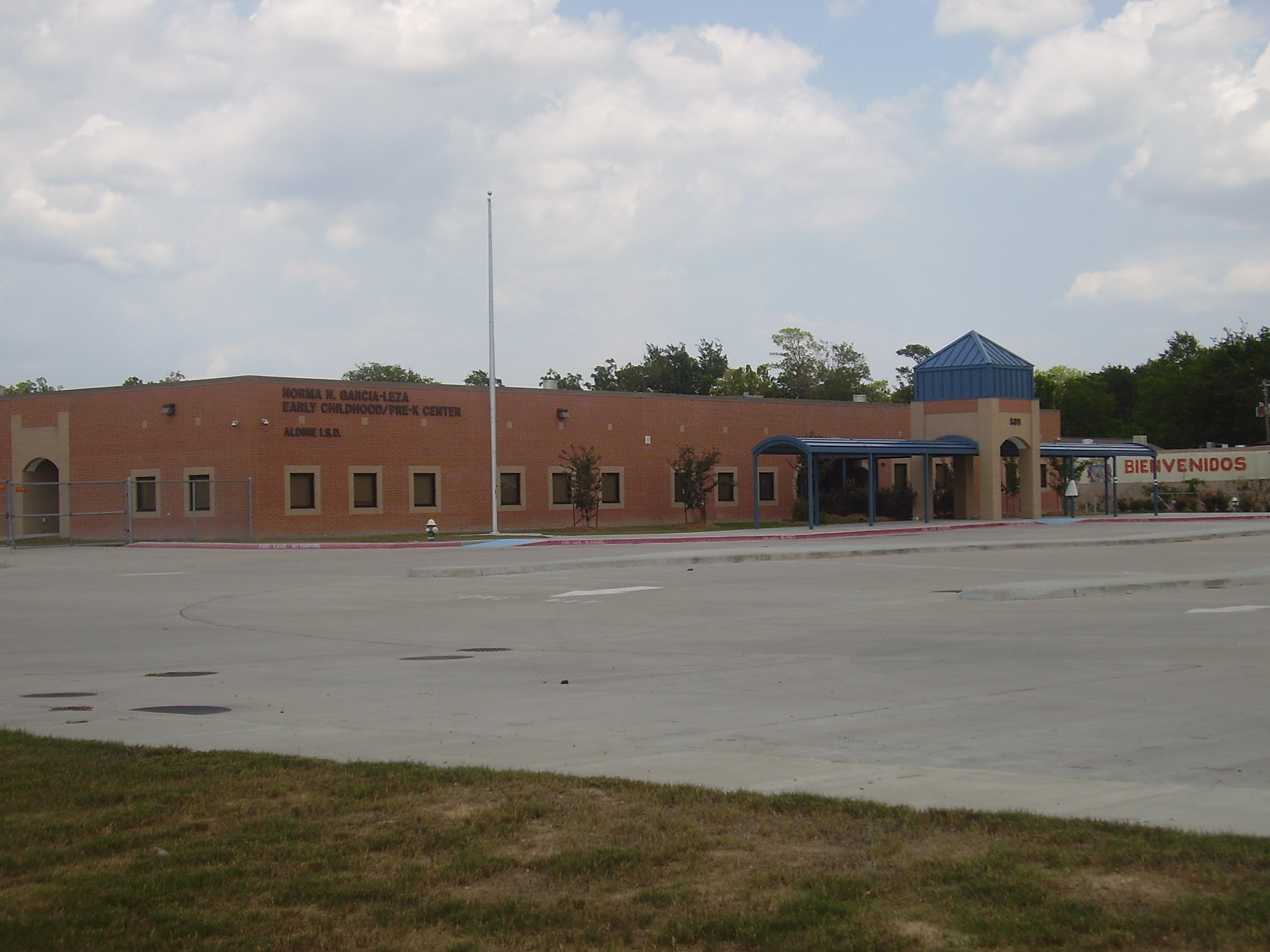
Garcia-Leza EC/PK/K Center

- Hinojosa EC/PK/K & Head Start Center (Unincorporated)
- A. W. Jones EC/PK/K Center (Opened Fall 2008)
- Keeble EC/PK/K & Head Start Center (Unincorporated)
- Kujawa EC/PK/K Center (Opened Fall 2008)
- Lou Vardamen EC/PK/K Center (Opened Fall 2018)
- Magrill EC/PK/K School
- Griggs EC/PK/K Center (Opened Fall 2018)
- Vines EC/PK & Head Start Center (Houston)
- Norma Garcia-Leza EC/PK/K Center (Opened Fall 2007)

== Former schools ==
- Smith Academy
- Raymond Academy for Engineering (The school is a zoned school) (Unincorporated)
- Wilson Elementary School (Closed 2022) (Building incorporated into the Impact Leadership Academy at Wilson)
- Parker Elementary School (Closed 2021) (Building incorporated into the YWLA)
- Bethune Academy (closed 2018)
- Mendel Elementary School (closed 2017)
- Bordersville Elementary School (closed 1976)
- Edgewood Elementary School
- Inez Carroll Elementary School (Raymac Rd campus) (1953 - 2001)
- Katherine Smith Elementary School (1954 - 1959) (now part of the Houston Independent School District)
- Marrs/Aldine Elementary (1933 - 1961) (now the Ellen B. Lane Center)
- Marrs Junior/Senior High School (1936 - 1956) (Building incorporated into current Aldine Middle School)
- Aldine Senior High School (Aldine-Westfield Rd campus) (1948 - 1954)

== Other facilities ==
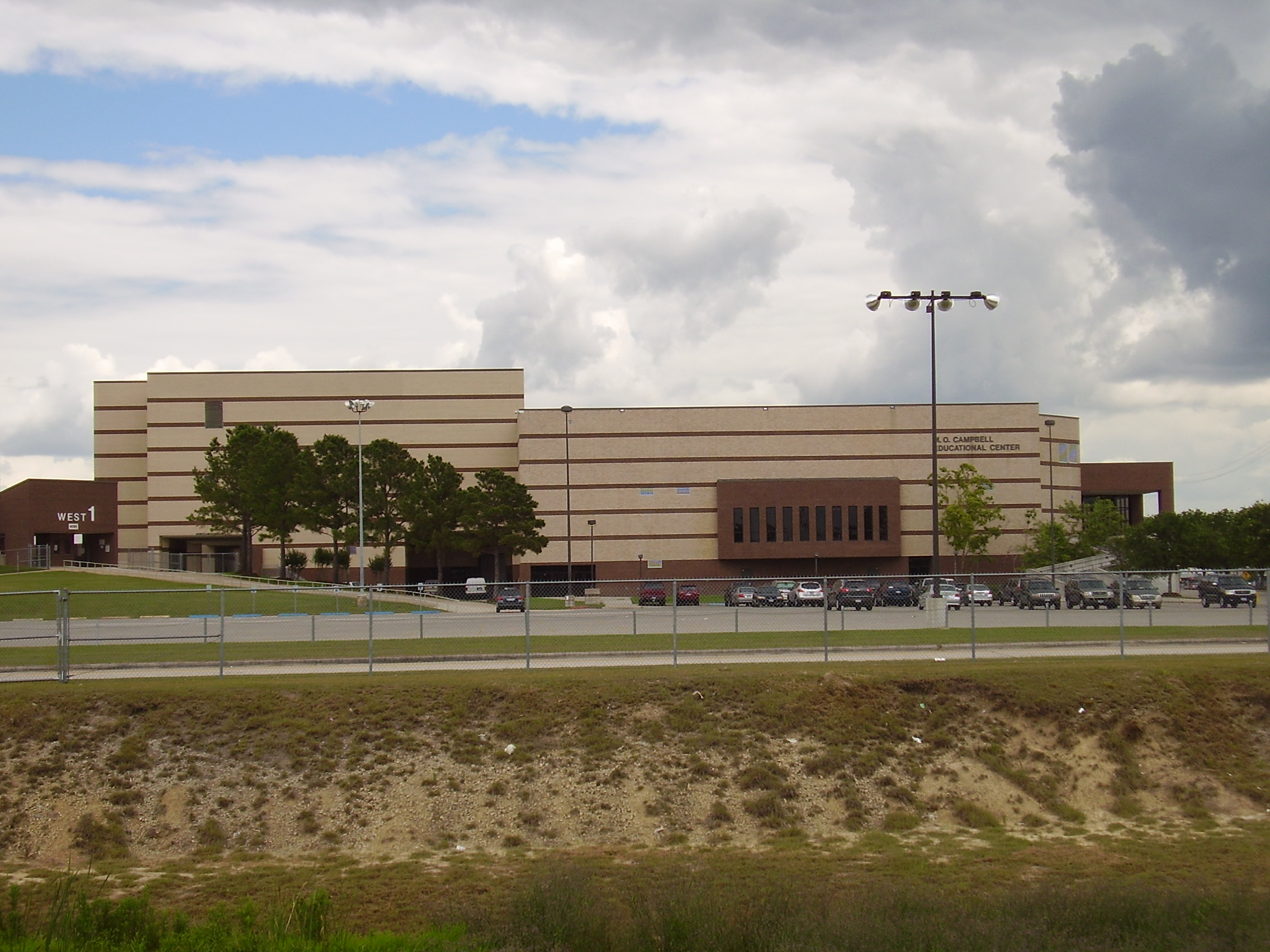
M.O. Campbell Educational Center

- W.W. Thorne Stadium
- M.O. Campbell Center
- Elliott Lansford Field
- Aldine ISD Softball Complex
- William A. "Bill" Smith Stadium
- William "Bill" Plummer Stadium

== Headquarters ==
The current headquarters building is the M.B. Sonny Donaldson Administration Building, a two-story facility in unincorporated Harris County, Texas, across from Nimitz High School. The school district acquired the facility in spring 2015 from Baker Hughes and opened it on March 21, 2016, with the dedication ceremony on April 19 of that year. The funds to purchase it came from the general operating budget.

The previous headquarters were in East Aldine. After serving as the headquarters for a period of over 50 years, the former headquarters has since been demolished

== See also ==
- List of school districts in Texas
