= Lone Star College–North Harris =

Community college in Harris County, Texas, US

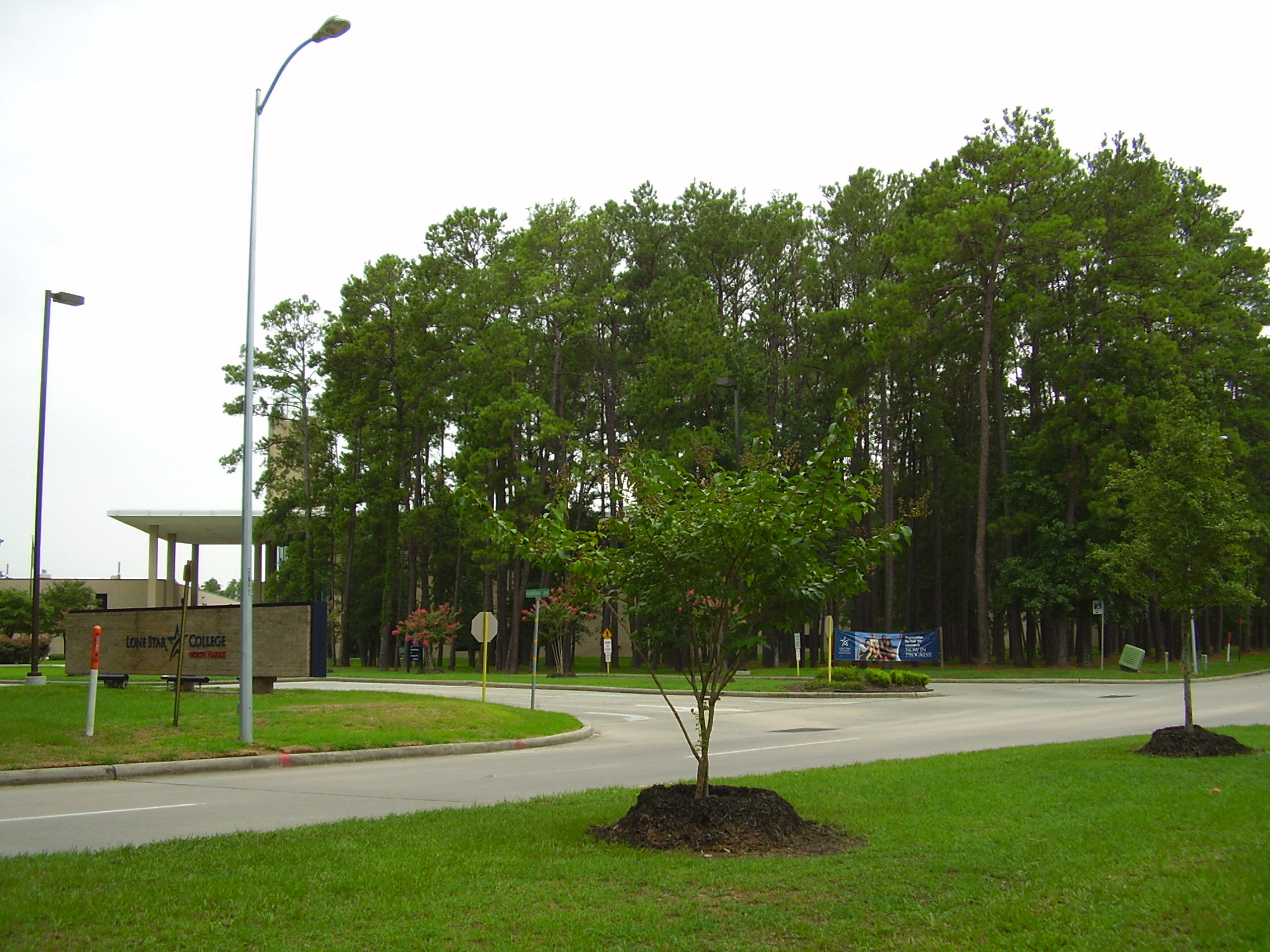
- LSC–North Harris
- Type: Community college
- Established: 1973
- Affiliations: Lone Star College System
- Chancellor: Mario Castillo
- President: Bennie E. Lambert
- Students: 10,956
- Location: Harris County, Texas, United States
- Campus: Urban, 254 acres (1 km²)
- Colors: Blue and Red
- Mascot: Hurricanes
- Website: http://northharris.lonestar.edu

Lone Star College–North Harris (formerly North Harris College, NHC) is a public community college, located in unincorporated Harris County, Texas. Part of the Lone Star College System, LSC North Harris offers Associate's degrees and program certifications in over 110 fields of study.

== History ==
It was established in 1972 by voters in the Aldine, Humble and Spring Independent School Districts, located in the northern parts of Houston and Harris County. Lone Star College–North Harris, opened 1973, serves nearly 11,000 students and is the district's only source for automotive technology, health information technology, child development and family studies, paralegal studies, medical assisting, and pharmacy technology programs.

=== Expansion and new facilities ===
In recent years, Lone Star College–North Harris has undertaken significant expansion projects to enhance its educational offerings. In 2022, the college completed the construction of a new state-of-the-art Health Professions Building, which houses advanced simulation labs, classrooms, and collaborative spaces designed for health science programs. This facility aims to provide students with hands-on training and experience using the latest medical technologies.

=== Academic achievements ===
In 2023, the college's Nursing program received accreditation from the Accreditation Commission for Education in Nursing (ACEN).

=== Community engagement ===
The college has strengthened its ties with the local community through various outreach initiatives. The Lone Star College–North Harris Community Engagement Center, opened in 2021, serves as a hub for community services, offering free workshops, job training programs, and educational resources to residents of the surrounding areas. The center's goal is to enhance the economic and social well-being of the community by providing accessible educational opportunities and support services.

== Location ==
The LSC-North Harris campus is situated on 254 acres (1 km²) of land originally owned by Aldine ISD, located just several hundred feet from Aldine's Nimitz High School. It is about 20 miles (32 km) north of Downtown Houston.

The Houston Weekend College of Our Lady of the Lake University previously operated at North Harris.

== Degree and certificate programs ==
- Automotive Technology
- Aviation Management
- Integrated Technologies
- Cosmetology
- Criminal Justice
- Emergency Medical Services (EMS) Professions
- Engineering Technology
- Health Information Technology
- Heating, Ventilation, AC & Refrigeration Technology
- Hospitality Management
- Interpreter Training Technology
- Machining Technology
- Management
- Medical Assisting
- Medical transcription
- Nursing
- Paralegal Studies
- Pharmacy Technology
- Teacher Education
- Welding and Inspection Technology
