= Carver High School (Houston, Texas) =

School in Houston, Texas, United States

Coordinates: 29.872°N 95.444°W

George W. Carver H.S. for Applied Technology, Engineering, & The Arts
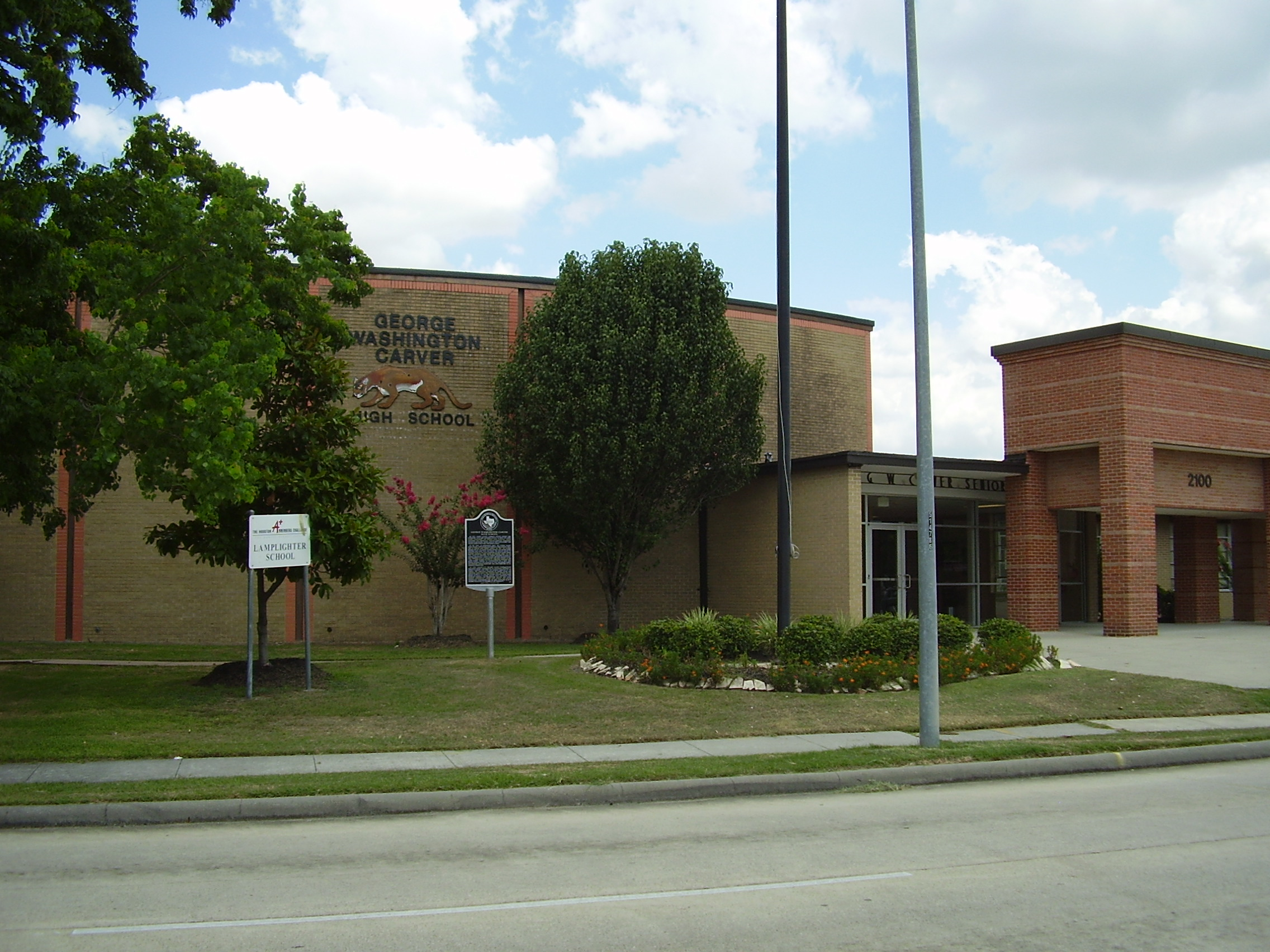

Location
- 2100 South Victory St. Houston, TX 77088

Information
- Established: 1915 (moved to its current location in 1954)
- School district: Aldine Independent School District
- Principal: Lakeshia Williams
- Staff: 53.04 (FTE)
- Grades: 9-12
- Enrollment: 747 (2023-2024)
- Student to teacher ratio: 14.08
- Mascot: Panther
- Website: Carver High School

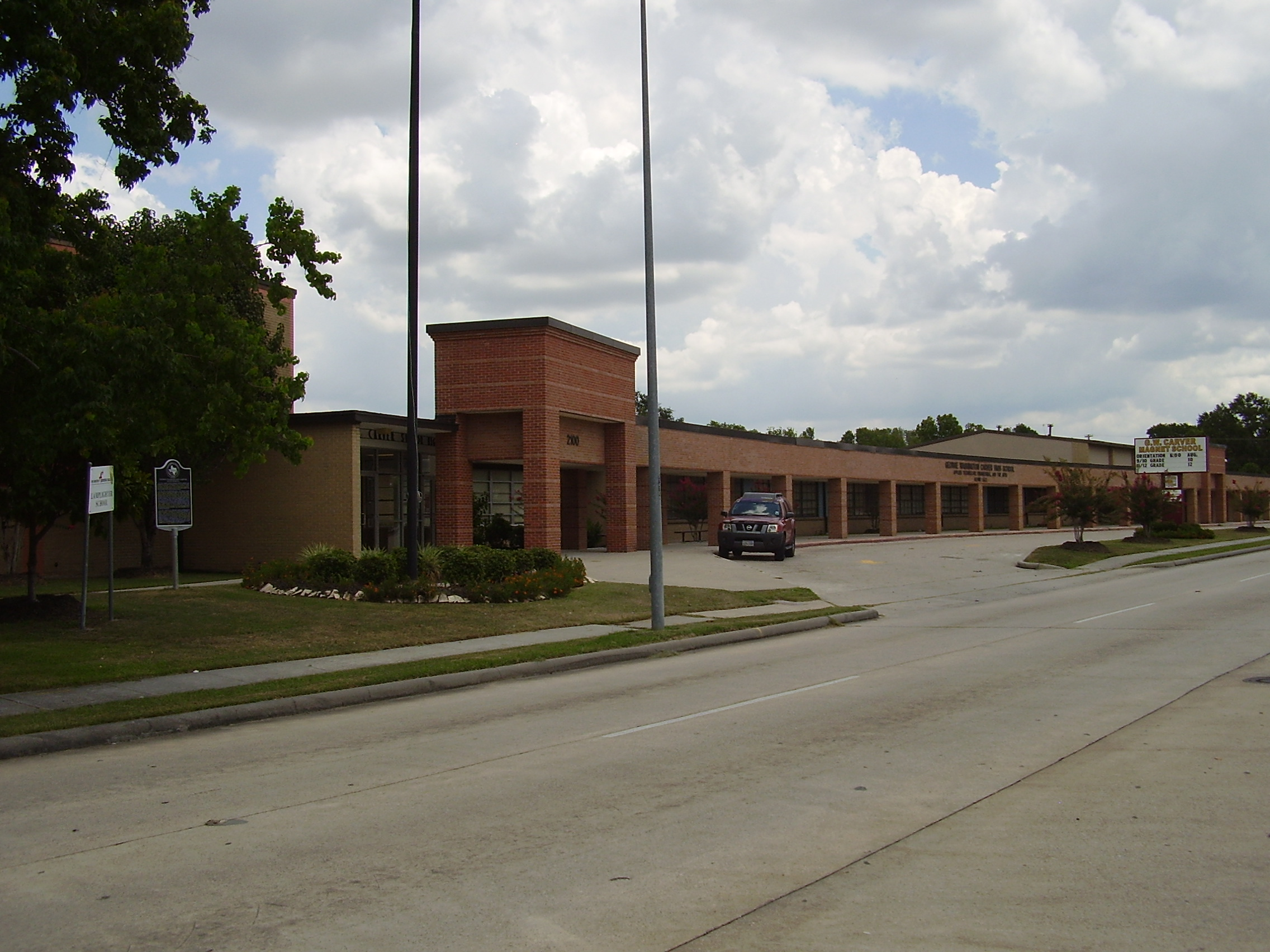
Carver High School

George Washington Carver High School for Applied Technology, Engineering and the Arts is a public secondary school in Houston, Texas, United States. The school is located in the historically African American community of Acres Homes and serves grades 9 through 12. It is named for African-American scientist and educator George Washington Carver. Carver is a magnet school and is a part of the Aldine Independent School District.

== Programs offered ==
Carver Magnet High School provides students with core subject classes and specialized areas of interest in performing arts, engineering, and the arts. Carver doesn't offer extracurricular sports, so students are bused to their home high schools to play on athletic teams.

Magnet School of Applied Engineering

- Architecture
- Electronics Engineering
- Interior Design
- Manufacturing Engineering
- Robotics - Mechatronics Engineering

Magnet School of Performing & Visual Arts

- Visual Arts
- Vocal Music
- Dance
- Instrumental Music
- Theater

== Academic performance ==
For the 2018-2019 school year, the school received a B grade from the Texas Education Agency, with an overall score of 84 out of 100. The school received a B grade in two domains, Student Achievement (score of 85) and School Progress (score of 87), and a C grade in Closing the Gaps (score of 76). The school received two of the seven possible distinction designations for Academic Achievement in Science and Academic Achievement in English Language Arts/Reading.

== Demographics ==
In the 2018-2019 school year, Carver High School had 776 students. 56.4% were African American, 0.3% were Asian, 40.2% were Hispanic, 0.3% were American Indian, 1.5% were White, and 1.3% were two or more races. 76.4% of students were Economically Disadvantaged, 6.4% were English Language Learners, and 6.3% received Special Education services.

== Feeder pattern ==
Carver has no actual feeder patterns, since it is a magnet school. Eighth grade students from middle schools from all over the Aldine school district apply for admissions into Carver the Spring semester prior to their freshmen year and attend Carver upon acceptance for high school.

Students in the 8th grade who are presently enrolled at both Drew and Grantham Academy are automatically accepted into Carver unless they choose to leave the Aldine Magnet Program and attend their home high school.

== Texas Historical Site ==
On Saturday, May 24, 2007, the Texas Historical Commission dedicated a historical marker at Carver High School.

== Notable alumna ==
- Loretta Devine — actress
