= Cove Energy plc =

Oil and gas exploration company

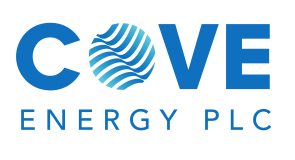
- Formerly: Lapp Plats plc
- Type: Public
- Traded as: LSE: COV
- Industry: Oil & gas exploration
- Predecessor: Lapp Plats plc
- Founded: 2009 in London, United Kingdom
- Founders: Michael Blaha; John Craven
- Defunct: 2012
- Fate: Acquired by PTT Exploration and Production Public Company Limited
- Headquarters: London, England
- Area served: East Africa, Eastern Mediterranean
- Key people: Michael Blaha (Executive Chairman); John Craven (CEO); Michael Nolan (Finance Director); Paul Griggs; Alexander Mollinger
- Total equity: ▲£1.2 billion (2012)
- Number of employees: <10 (2012)
- Website: cove-energy.com linkedin.com

Cove Energy plc, also known as Cove, was a London-headquartered oil and gas exploration company with assets in East Africa. The company was created in June 2009. In 2012, following significant gas discoveries offshore Mozambique, Royal Dutch Shell and PTT Exploration and Production (PTTEP), a subsidiary of Thailand's national oil company PTT Public Company Limited, engaged in a prominent bidding war to acquire Cove. Ultimately, the company was sold in August 2012 to PTTEP.

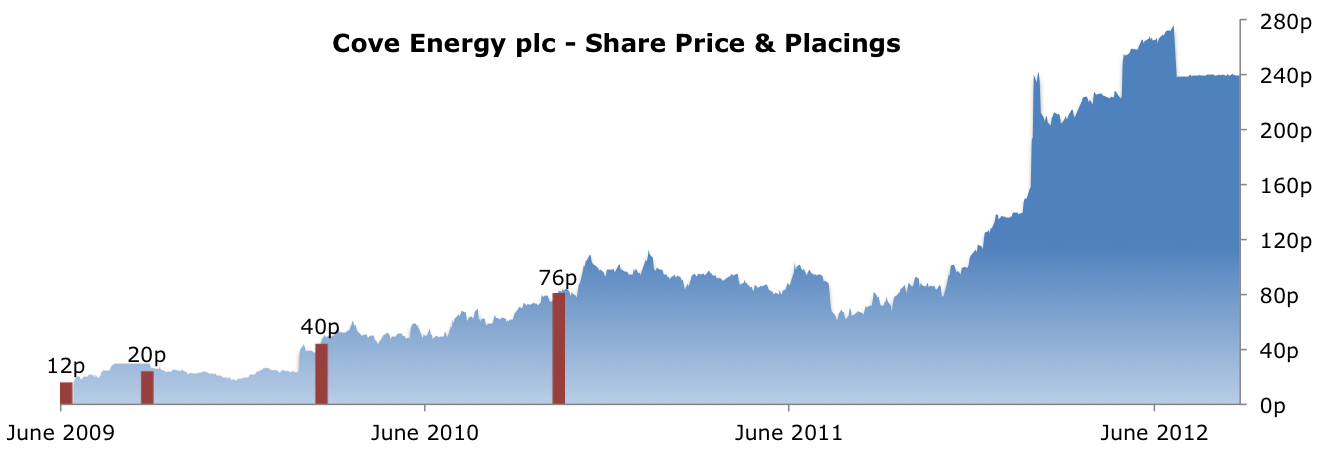
Share price of Cove Energy

== The early days ==
In early 2009, Michael Blaha and John Craven, two industry veterans, teamed up to create a new oil & gas explorer with a focus on the largely unexplored deep waters of East Africa and the Eastern Mediterranean. They joined the Board of Directors of Lapp Plats plc, a cash-shell listed on the Alternative Investment Market of the London Stock Exchange and renamed the company Cove Energy plc.

Michael Blaha was appointed Executive Chairman and John Craven became the CEO. Prior to joining Cove, Michael Blaha was the Country Chairman of Shell in Algeria. John Craven was the founder and former CEO of Petroceltic International. Michael Nolan was appointed Financial Director. The management team also consisted of Paul Griggs and Alexander Mollinger. The non-executive directors of Cove included Frank Moxon, Dr Steve Staley and Anthony Golding.

Cove's strategy was to create value for shareholders through acquiring participations in exploration assets and appraisal programmes. The company focussed on young and emerging basins, de-risked through 3D seismic. It also aimed at partnering with proven and reliable operators.

== Funding ==
Cove was listed on the Alternative Investment Market of the London Stock Exchange. Over a period of seventeen months, between June 2009 and November 2010, the company raised a total of £182 million through four placings. Each placing was done at a significant higher market capitalisation than the previous one:

- June 2009: £4 million at £0.12 per share
- September 2009: £42 million at £0.20 per share
- March 2010: £26 million at £0.40 per share
- November 2010: £110 million at £0.76 per share

The funds were mostly used to acquire assets and then to keep up with the cost allotment of the fast-paced and expensive drilling campaign offshore Mozambique. A feature of the Cove business model was that it was sufficiently funded through all stages of its development to support the dynamic and active exploration programmes in all its operations and was also adequately funded to make strategic acquisitions.

== The Artumas acquisition ==
In September 2009, Cove acquired several assets from Artumas Group Inc. (now known as Wentworth Resources Limited). These assets, located in Mozambique and Tanzania, consisted of:

- 8.5% interest in Rovuma Offshore Area 1, offshore Mozambique
- 10% interest in Rovuma Onshore Block, onshore Mozambique
- 16.38% interest in the production and 20.475% interest in the exploration of the Mnazi Bay concession, offshore Tanzania

== Portfolio of assets ==
Cove's portfolio consisted of oil & gas exploration assets in Mozambique, Tanzania and Kenya. The company was also part of a consortium to bid in two licensing rounds in the Eastern Mediterranean.

=== Mozambique ===
==== Rovuma Offshore Area 1 ====
In September 2009, Cove acquired from Artumas an 8.5% interest in Rovuma Offshore Area 1 (also known as Area 1), offshore Northern Mozambique. The block covered 9,562 km^{2} (c. 2.4 million acres), located in the deep waters off the coast of Northern Mozambique. It was operated by Anadarko Petroleum. The partnership consisted of Anadarko Petroleum (36.5%), Mitsui (20%), Empresa Nacional de Hydrocarbonetos, E.P. (15%), Bharat Petroleum (10%), Videocon (10%) and Cove Energy (8.5%).

In late 2009, Cove and its partners started drilling their first exploration well, Windjammer. In February 2010, it discovered the giant Prosperidade field. In the period from 2010 to 2012, an additional seven exploration wells and five appraisal wells were drilled, and extensive flow testing was conducted and the recoverable resources increased from 5+ Trillion Cubic Feet (TCF) to 35-65+ TCF of gas.

Prosperidade and the surrounding gas discoveries at Orca, Lagosta, Atum, Golfinho and Tubarão are among the world's largest gas discoveries in the last 20 years. Today, the recoverable resources are estimated at 50-70+ TCF of gas. Area 1 is due to start producing gas in 2019 and has the potential to transform Mozambique into one of the world's largest LNG exporters, similar to Qatar and Australia, and offer long-term benefits to the population. Development of Area 1

==== Rovuma Onshore Block ====
In September 2009, Cove acquired from Artumas a 10% interest in Rovuma Onshore Block, onshore Northern Mozambique. The block covered 13,452 km^{2} (c. 3.3 million acres) and was operated by Anadarko Petroleum. The partnership consisted of Anadarko Petroleum (35.7%), Maurel & Prom (27.71%), Empresa Nacional de Hidrocarbonetos, E.P. (15%), Wentworth Resources (11.59%) and Cove Energy (10%). In 2019, TotalEnergies purchased the Andarko share of the project.

In Q1 2012, Cove and its partners shot a c. 1,200 km 2D seismic survey covering Rovuma Onshore Block. Interpretation of the seismic data resulted in two prospects being identified, which were believed to be gas prone. Cove was acquired by PTTEP in August 2012 before any of the prospects were drilled.

=== Tanzania ===
==== Mnazi Bay ====
In September 2009, Cove acquired from Artumas a 16.38% interest in the production and 20.475% interest in the exploration of the Mnazi Bay concession, partly offshore and partly onshore Southern Tanzania. The concession covered c. 760 km^{2} (c. 0.2 million acres) and was operated by Maurel & Prom. For the production, the partnership consisted of Maurel & Prom (38.22%), Wentworth Resources (25.4%), Tanzania Petroleum Development Corporation (20%) and Cove Energy (16.38%). For the exploration, the partnership consisted of Maurel & Prom (47.775%), Wentworth Resources (31.75%) and Cove Energy (20.475%).

In July 2012, Cove sold its interests in the Mnazi Bay concession to Maurel & Prom and Wentworth Resources.

=== Kenya ===
==== Blocks L5-L7-L11A-L11B-L12 ====
In July 2010, Cove acquired from US-based Dynamic Global Advisers (DGA) a 15% interest in blocks L5-L7-L11A-L11B-L12, offshore Kenya. The blocks covered 30,632 km^{2} (c. 7.6 million acres) and were operated by Anadarko Petroleum.

In Q3 2011, the blocks were farmed down by Anadarko Petroleum, DGA and Cove to TotalEnergies, which left Cove with a 10% interest and substantial carry on further 3D seismic acquisition and drilling. Consequently, DGA sold its remaining interest to Total. The partnership then consisted of Anadarko Petroleum (50%), Total (40%) and Cove Energy (10%).

In Q3-Q4 2011, Cove and its partners shot a c. 3,000 km^{2} 3D seismic survey covering blocks L5-L7-L11A-L11B-L12. Interpretation of the seismic data resulted in a number of large prospects being identified, which were believed to be oil-prone. Cove was acquired by PTTEP in August 2012 before any of the prospects were drilled.

==== Blocks L10A-L10B ====
In early 2011, Cove formed a consortium with BG Group, Premier Oil and Pan Continental Oil & Gas to participate in the upcoming bidding round in Kenya. Following two successful bid applications, Cove signed Production Sharing Contracts for blocks L10A and L10B, located in deep waters in the Southern portion of the Lamu basin and adjacent to, and inboard of, blocks L5-L7-L11A-L11B-L12. The blocks covered 10,516 km^{2} (c. 2.6 million acres) and were operated by BG Group. For block L10A, the partnership consisted of BG Group (40%), Premier Oil (20%), Pan Continental Oil & Gas (15%) and Cove Energy (25%). For block L10B, the partnership consisted of BG Group (45%), Premier Oil (25%), Pan Continental Oil & Gas NL (15%) and Cove Energy (15%).

In Q4 2011, Cove and its partners shot a c. 2,000 km^{2} 3D seismic survey covering blocks L10A and L10B. Interpretation of the seismic data resulted in a number of large prospects being identified, which were believed to be oil prone. Cove was acquired by PTTEP in August 2012 before any of the prospects were drilled.

=== Cyprus and Lebanon ===
In 2010, Cove formed a consortium with Cairn Energy and CC Energy Development SAL, an affiliate company of Consolidated Contractors Company, to participate in the upcoming licensing rounds in Cyprus and Lebanon. When Cove was acquired by PTTEP in August 2012, the licensing rounds had not taken place yet and thus Cove withdrew from the consortium.

== The sale process ==
Notwithstanding its strong financial position, Cove put itself up for sale in December 2011. Given Prosperidade’s size and its close distance to the gas-hungry Asian markets, the sale attracted a long list of high-calibre suitors, including major independents and national oil companies.

Between February and July 2012, Shell and PTTEP engaged in a prominent bidding war to acquire Cove. On 21 February 2012, Shell placed an indicative bid of £1.95 per share. Two days later, Cove received an indicative bid of £2.20 per share from PTTEP. On 3 May 2012, Shell made a recommended cash offer of £2.20 per share, followed on 23 May 2012 by a recommended cash offer of £2.40 per share from PTTEP. In July 2012, Shell retracted its offer and announced it was withdrawing from the bidding process. In August 2012, Cove was sold to PTTEP for £1.2 billion (£2.40 per share). It was one of 2012's most prominent public takeovers worldwide.

== Post-Cove ==
In November 2012, the former management team of Cove Energy (in its entirety) founded a new oil & gas exploration company, Discover Exploration Limited (also known as Discover). The management team consists of former-Cove executives Michael Blaha, John Craven, Michael Nolan, Alexander Mollinger and Paul Griggs. Similar to Cove, Discover's strategy is to deliver value to shareholders through participation in exploration and appraisal programmes focussing on deep-water petroleum systems. Discover has exploration assets in the Africa and New Zealand.

The initial funding of Discover came in November 2012 from ONH B.V., and Discover's management team and Board of Directors. ONH B.V. is the holding company of Oranje-Nassau Energie B.V., the largest privately owned Dutch exploration and production operating company.

In December 2013, The Carlyle Group announced that it was backing the management team of Discover Exploration by investing up to US$200 million in the company.

In November 2014, McKinsey & Company published A new approach to oil and gas exploration, an article on the management team of Cove Energy and Discover Exploration.
