= Ironclad gas field =

Natural gas field offshore Cabo Delgado Province, Mozambique

Ironclad
- Country: Mozambique
- Region: Cabo Delgado Province
- Offshore/onshore: offshore
- Coordinates: 11.3976°S 40.9028°E
- Operator: Occidental Petroleum

Field history
- Discovery: 2012
- Start of production: 2012

Production
- Current production of gas: 1.9×10^{6} m^{3}/d 50×10^{6} cu ft/d 0.5×10^{9} m^{3}/a (18×10^{9} cu ft/a)
- Estimated gas in place: 143×10^{9} m^{3} 5×10^{12} cu ft

The Ironclad gas field is a natural gas field located offshore the Cabo Delgado Province of Mozambique. Discovered in 2012, it was developed by Anadarko Petroleum, determining it to have initial total proven reserves of around 5 trillion ft^{3} (143 km^{3}). It began production of natural gas and condensates later that year, with a production rate of around 50 million ft^{3}/day (1.9×10^{5} m^{3}).
