= Stephen Chazen =

American businessman (1946–2022)

- Born: 1946
- Died: September 22, 2022 (aged 75–76)
- Education: Rutgers University; University of Houston; Michigan State University
- Occupations: CEO, Occidental Petroleum (2011–2016)
- Successor: Vicki Hollub

Stephen Chazen (1946 – September 22, 2022) was an American businessman. He was president and chief executive officer (CEO) of Occidental Petroleum from 2011 to 2016.

== Early life ==
He was born in 1946. He earned a bachelor's degree in geology from Rutgers University, a master's degree in finance from the University of Houston, and a PhD in geology from Michigan State University.

== Career ==
He worked as a managing director in corporate finance and mergers and acquisitions at Merrill Lynch.

In 1994, he started his career at Occidental Petroleum (OXY), a publicly traded oil corporation then headquartered in Los Angeles, California and the fourth largest oil producer in the United States. He was executive vice president-corporate development at Occidental Petroleum from 1994 to 1999, and as its executive vice president-corporate development from 1999 to 2004. He was its senior executive vice president from 2004 to 2007, and as its chief financial officer from 2004 to 2007. He was its president since December 2007 until 2016 and as its chief executive officer since May 5, 2011 through April 29, 2016. He replaced Ray R. Irani, who went on to serve as chairman. He has denied conflict with Irani.

According to a study by the Graziadio School of Business and Management at Pepperdine University, under his leadship, OXY earned US$3.4 billion in profit in 2011, an increase of $1.6 billion from 2010, making him the value-generation business leader in Southern California.

He was on the board of directors of the American Petroleum Institute, Lyondell Chemical Company, Premcor and Washington Mutual.

As of August 2016, he was reported to be worth over US$128 million, due to his stock holdings in Occidental Petroleum and other companies.

He was on the board of trustees of the Aquarium of the Pacific and Catalina Island Conservancy. He was a Republican.

In 2019, Chazen was asked to rejoin Occidental as a board member.

== Death ==
Chazen died on September 22, 2022.
