= Collier gas field =

Natural gas field offshore Cabo Delgado Province, Mozmbique

Collier
- Country: Mozambique
- Region: Cabo Delgado Province
- Offshore/onshore: offshore
- Coordinates: 10.9704°S 40.8465°E
- Operator: Occidental Petroleum

Field history
- Discovery: 2012
- Start of production: 2012

Production
- Current production of gas: 1.9×10^{6} m^{3}/d 50×10^{6} cu ft/d 0.5×10^{9} m^{3}/a (18×10^{9} cu ft/a)
- Estimated gas in place: 143×10^{9} m^{3} 5×10^{12} cu ft

The Collier gas field is a natural gas field located off the shore of the Cabo Delgado Province of Mozambique. Discovered in 2012, it was developed by Anadarko Petroleum, determining it to have initial total proven reserves of around 5 trillion cubic feet (140 km^{3}). It began production of natural gas and condensates later that year, with a production rate of 50 million cubic feet (1,400,000 m^{3}) a day.
