= Vicki Hollub =

American businesswoman and mineral engineer

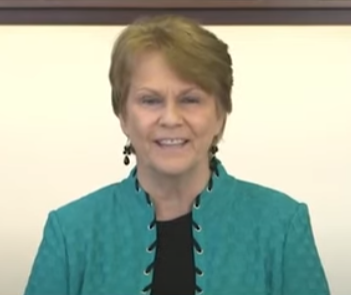
- Hollub in 2021
- Born: 1960 (age 65–66); Birmingham, Alabama, U.S.
- Education: University of Alabama (BS)
- Title: President and CEO, Occidental Petroleum
- Term: April 2016 – June 2026
- Predecessor: Stephen Chazen
- Successor: Richard Jackson

Vicki Hollub (born 1959) is an American businesswoman and mineral engineer. She was president and chief executive officer of Occidental Petroleum from April 2016 to June 2026, when Richard Jackson succeeded her; she remained on the company's board after retiring as chief executive. She was the first woman to lead a major American oil company.

== Early life ==
Vicki Hollub was born in 1960 in Birmingham, Alabama, and graduated in 1977 from McAdory High School. She attended the University of Alabama, and in 1981 earned a bachelor's degree (BS) in mineral engineering with a concentration in fuels and mineral resources. Hollub was in the 2016 class of Distinguished Engineering Fellows from the University of Alabama College of Engineering.

== Career ==
=== Early career ===
Initially working on oil rigs in Mississippi, Hollub started her career in 1981 with Cities Service, when it was a fully integrated oil and gas company. Cities Service was acquired by Occidental Petroleum Corporation in 1982. She subsequently held technical and management positions for Occidental in the United States, Russia, Venezuela, and Ecuador.

=== Occidental and Permian expansion ===
In 2005, Hollub became involved in leading Occidental's expansion in the Permian Basin in West Texas and southeastern New Mexico. She was manager of operations for Occidental's Permian business from 2009 until 2011, before being promoted to president and general manager from 2011 until 2012.

=== Executive management roles ===
From 2012 until 2013 Hollub was executive vice president of Occidental's operations in California. In October 2013 she was named both Occidental Petroleum's vice president and the executive vice president of U.S. Operations, Oxy Oil and Gas, a role she held until July 2014. From 2014 until May 2015, she was the executive vice president of Occidental Petroleum and president of Occidental Oil & Gas Corp in the Americas from July 2014 until May 2015, which gave her oversight of operations in Latin America and worldwide exploration.

In May 2015, Occidental's board of directors selected Hollub to succeed retiring chief executive officer (CEO) Stephen Chazen, basing their decision on Hollub's "strong track record of successfully growing [Occidental's] domestic oil and gas business profitably and efficiently." During a subsequent transition period she was responsible for operations in the Middle East, Latin America and the United States. In May 2015, she was named senior executive vice president of Occidental and president of Oxy Oil and Gas. Later that year, in December 2015 Hollub was appointed the global president and chief operating officer (COO) of Occidental, with oversight for the company's midstream, chemical, and oil and gas operations.

=== CEO and president ===
Hollub officially became president and CEO of Occidental Petroleum in April 2016, with responsibility for operations, strategy and financial management. The appointment made her the first woman to head a major American oil company, and that year Fortune named her #32 on its annual list of the Most Powerful Women in business. Hollub was appointed CEO during a severe downturn in the oil industry. Under Hollub, Occidental cut production costs in response to falling crude prices but decided not to lay off employees. The company focused on existing core operations in the Middle East, the United States, and Colombia in Latin America, while continuing to sell low-yield fields in Iraq, Libya, Yemen, North Dakota, Colorado, Kansas, and Oklahoma. Hollub placed "particular emphasis" on developing the Permian Basin in the southern United States, which had been a consistent driver of profits. Half of Occidental's output was coming from the Permian Basin by July 2017, while the other half came from Qatar, Oman, the United Arab Emirates and Colombia. At that time, Forbes wrote that Hollub's focus on high-producing oil fields had made Occidental "leaner" and "poised to gusher cash for the next half-century."

In 2019, Occidental Petroleum acquired Anadarko Petroleum and assumed its debt. Hollub was a major proponent of the deal, and personally enlisted financing from Warren Buffett in order to complete it. Occidental did not allow shareholders to vote on the deal, which drew criticism from several major investors including sixth-largest shareholder T. Rowe Price.

In March 2020 amid a major stock market crash and an international oil crisis that saw the company's stock price plummet dramatically, a group of activist investors led by Carl Icahn have stated their desire to replace the entire Occidental board of directors, including Hollub. Icahn wrote an open letter stating his view that Hollub and the board bought Anadarko to save their own jobs, and failed to protect shareholders' capital when they heavily indebted Occidental by borrowing over $40 billion in order to purchase Anadarko at a "massive" 65% premium.

=== Awards and honors ===
In 2023, Hollub ranked 50th in Forbes list of World's 100 most powerful women. In the same year, she was ranked 38th on Fortune's list of Most Powerful Women.

Hollub was elected to the National Academy of Engineering in 2024 for leadership in energy company management and advocating for carbon management solutions.

In 2025, Hollub was inducted into the Texas Women's Hall of Fame.

== Boards and councils ==
Hollub was elected to the board of directors at Occidental Petroleum in December 2015. She joined the board of Lockheed Martin in 2018. She is the U.S. chair for the U.S.-Colombia Business Council. She also is on the boards of Khalifa University for Science and Technology in Abu Dhabi and the American Petroleum Institute. Hollub is a member of the Society of Petroleum Engineers (SPE).

== See also ==
- List of women CEOs of Fortune 500 companies
