= The Woodlands, Texas =

- CDP and SPD
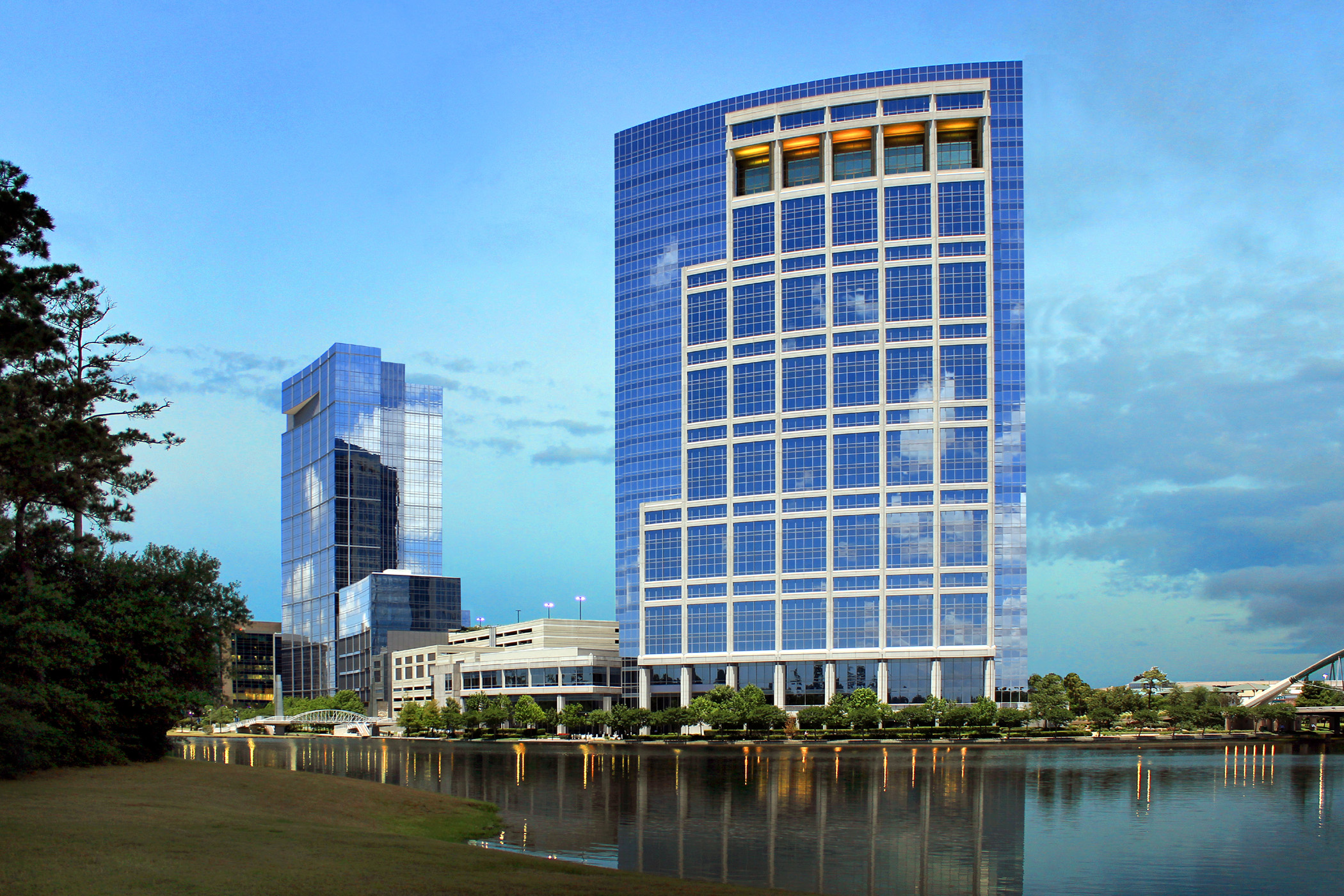
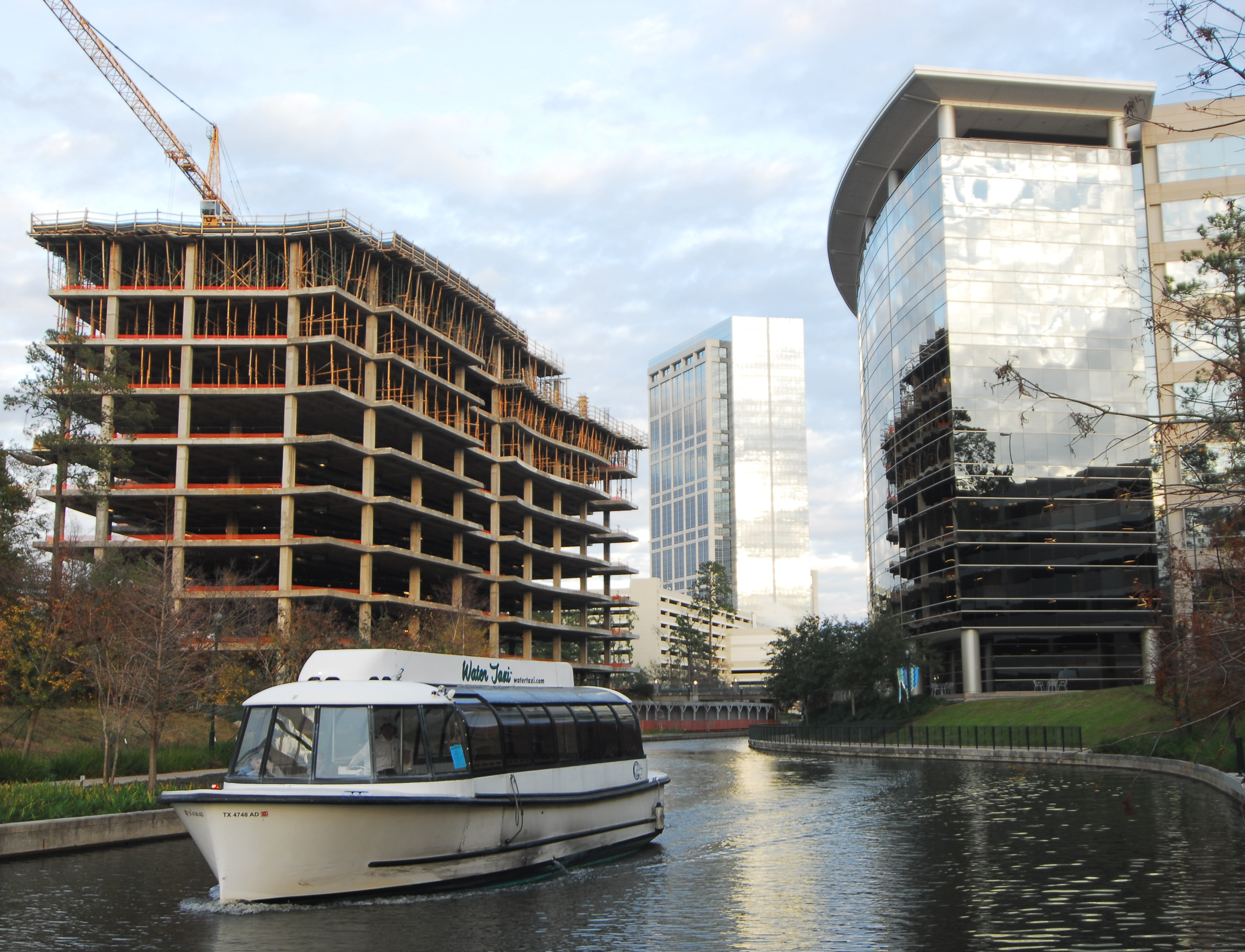
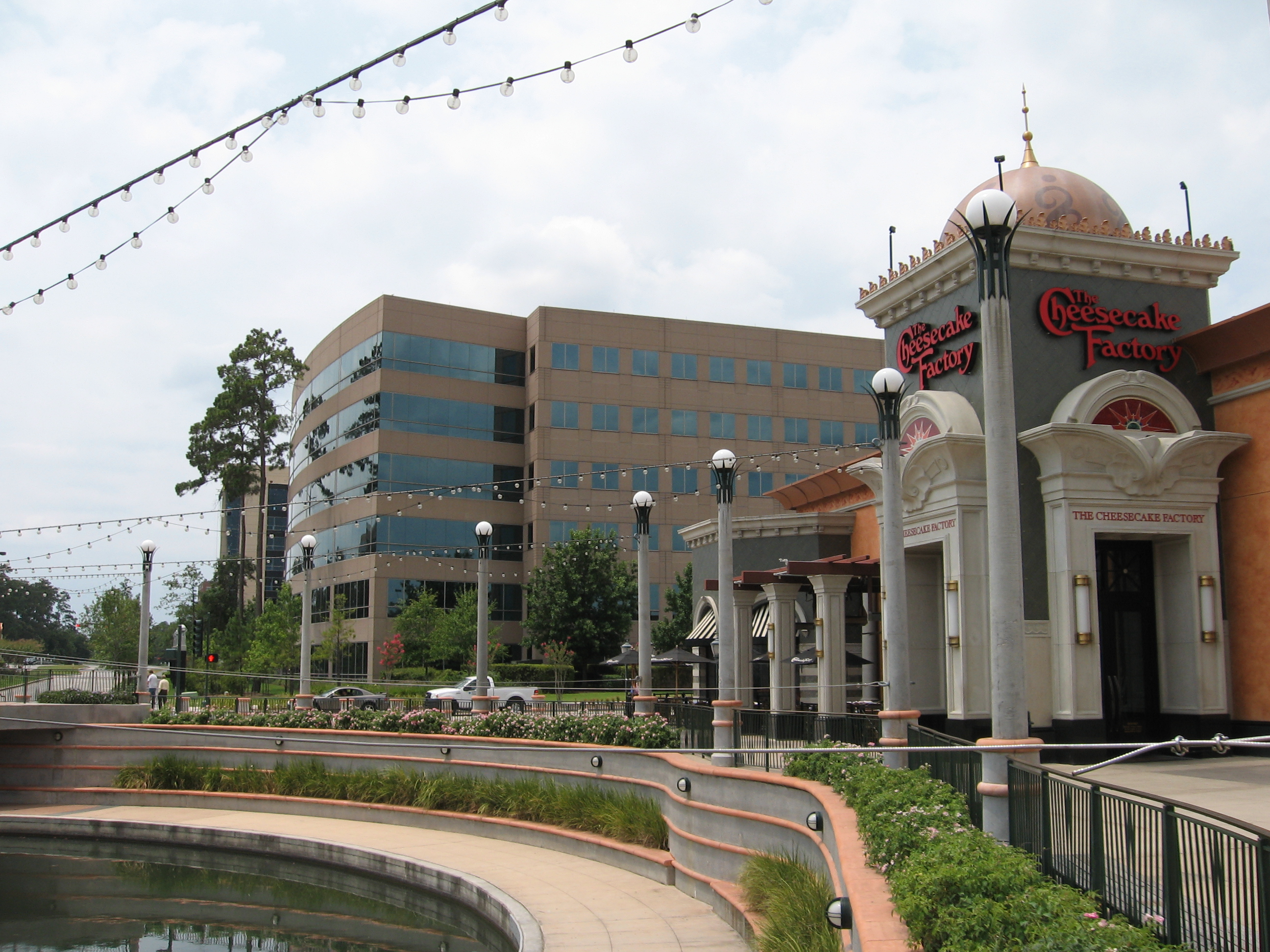
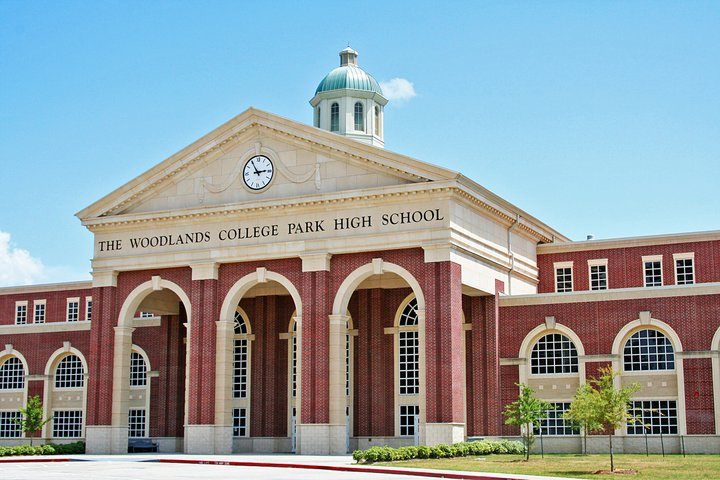
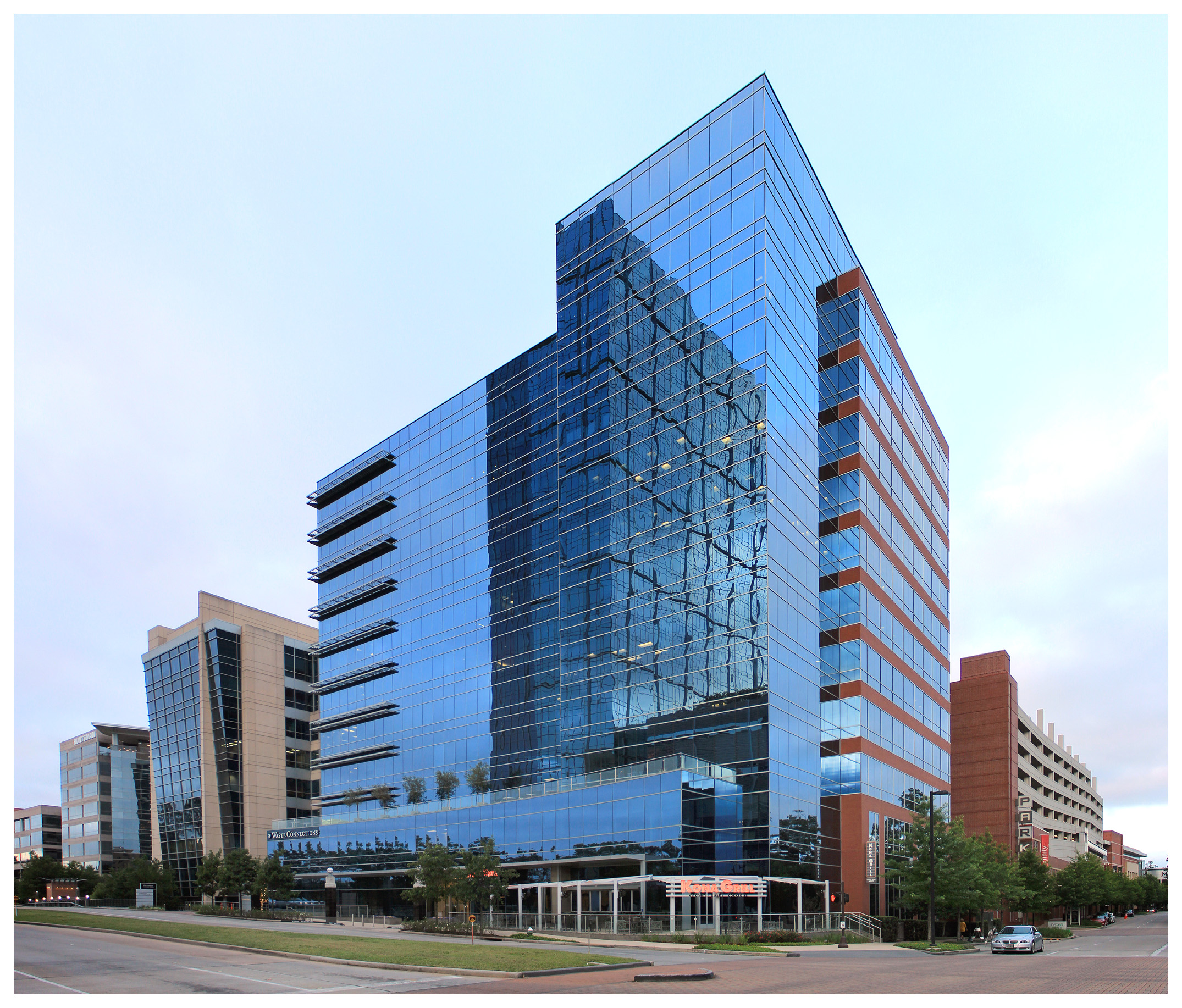
- Top to bottom, left to right: The Woodlands Town Center, The Woodlands Waterway, Town Center, The Woodlands College Park High School, Waste Connections

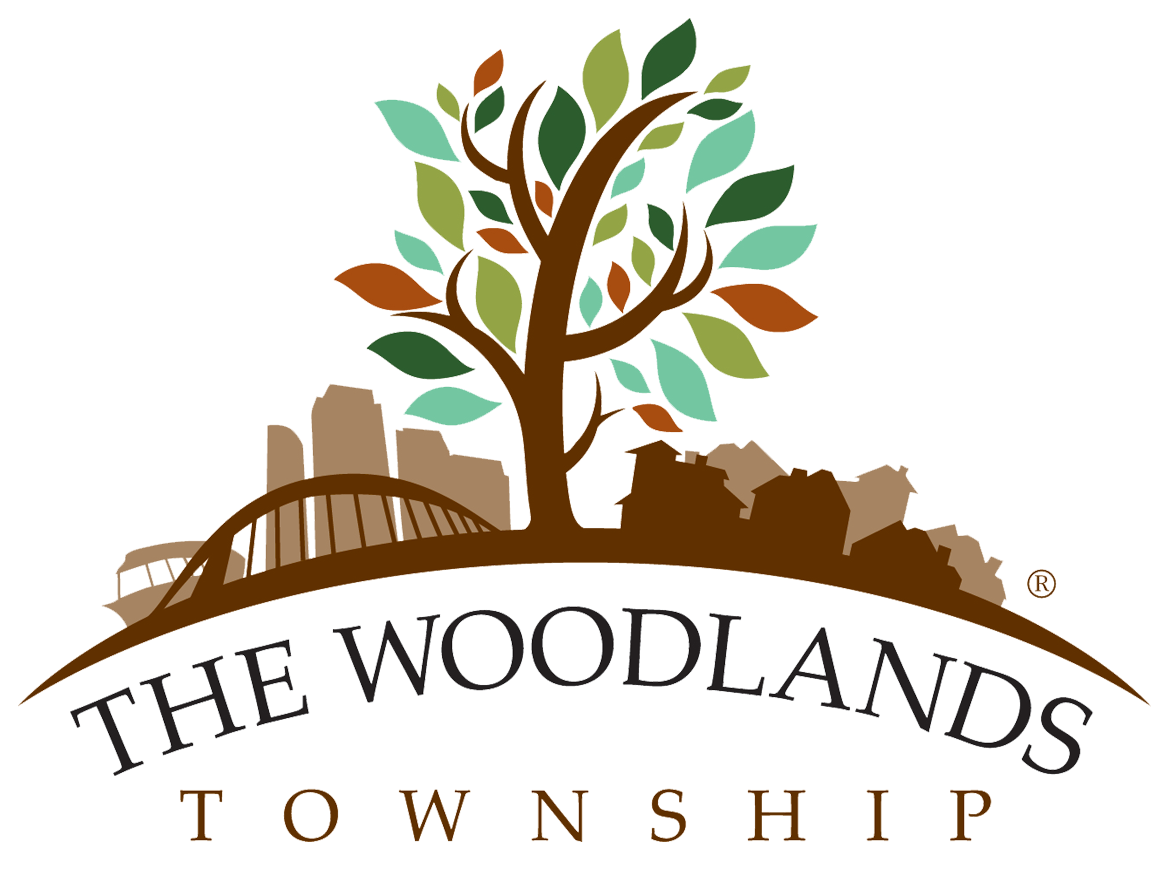
- Seal

- The Woodlands in Montgomery and Harris counties

- Location in Texas Location in the United States
- Coordinates: 30°9′46″N 95°27′41″W
- Country: United States
- State: Texas
- Counties: Montgomery, Harris
- Established: 1974

Government
  - Board of Directors: Brad Bailey (Chairman); Craig Eissler (Vice Chairman); Linda Nelson (Secretary); Richard Franks (Treasurer); Adam Lamb; Shelley Sekula-Gibbs; Cindy Heiser

Area
  - CDP and SPD: 43.9 sq mi (113.6 km^{2})
  - Land: 43.3 sq mi (112.1 km^{2})
  - Water: 0.58 sq mi (1.5 km^{2})
- Elevation: 160 ft (49 m)

Population (2020)
  - CDP and SPD: 114,436
  - Estimate (2021): 119,000
  - Density: 2,644/sq mi (1,020.8/km^{2})
  - Urban: 402,454 (US: 103rd)
  - Urban density: 1,837/sq mi (709.1/km^{2})
- Time zone: UTC−6 (CST)
  - Summer (DST): UTC−5 (CDT)
- Postal code: 77380-77386
- Area code: 281/346/621/713/832/936
- FIPS code: 48-72656
- GNIS feature ID: 1867568
- Website: thewoodlandstownship-tx.gov

The Woodlands is a special-purpose district and census-designated place in the U.S. state of Texas. The Woodlands is primarily located in Montgomery County, with portions extending into Harris County, within the Greater Houston metropolitan area. The population was 114,436 at the 2020 census.

The Woodlands area is governed by The Woodlands Township, an organization that provides municipal services and is administered by an elected board of directors. The United States Census Bureau defines an urban area separate from the Houston urban area with The Woodlands as a principal city: The Woodlands–Conroe urban area had a population of 402,454 in 2020, making it the 103rd-largest in the United States.

The Woodlands is located 28 miles (45 km) north of Houston along Interstate 45. Though it began as an exurban development and a bedroom community, it has also attracted corporations and has several corporate campuses, most notably Occidental Petroleum Corporation, Chevron Phillips Chemical, Huntsman Corporation, Woodforest National Bank, Baker Hughes, McKesson Specialty Health, and Halliburton. The community won a Special Award for Excellence in 1994 from the Urban Land Institute.

== History ==
=== Early history ===
The area that is now The Woodlands was occupied by the Akokisa and Bidai peoples, who relied on the fresh water of Spring Creek. In 1984, construction in the Indian Springs neighborhood near the creek discovered Bidai artifacts.

=== Foundation and growth ===
The Woodlands was conceived after the oil industry investor George P. Mitchell attended a symposium by the Rouse Company subsidiary American City Corporation and developer of Columbia, Maryland, on how to develop new towns using the HUD Title VII program. It was dedicated by George P. Mitchell in 1974 and managed by The Woodlands Corporation as an extension of Mitchell Energy & Development. Mitchell, an oil businessman, planned to establish a conference center, hotels, office parks, retail malls, schools, large distribution centers, and golf courses. Houses would range from moderately priced to expensive and large. Bill Schadewald of the Houston Business Journal said that Mitchell wanted the development to "entice city slickers looking for far-flung suburban quality of life." Schadewald said that local sources stated that the HUD Title VII program had a "low survival rate" and questioned whether The Woodlands would succeed.

The Woodlands Corporation was acquired on July 31, 1997, by a partnership between Morgan Stanley and Crescent Real Estate Equities. In December 2003, Rouse Company acquired Crescent's interest, and Rouse was bought by General Growth Properties on November 12, 2004. In 2011, The Woodlands was sold to the Howard Hughes Development Corporation.

The land was previously occupied by the Grogan-Cochran Lumber Mill, hence Grogan's Mill and Cochran's Crossing neighborhoods, called "villages." The original planning utilized many of the planning concepts and design consultants employed in other well-regarded new communities of that era such as Columbia, Maryland, Irvine Ranch, California, and Reston, Virginia. The original development plan included environmental design principles espoused by Ian McHarg, a distinguished landscape architect, teacher and author of the seminal work Design With Nature.

In 2012, the U.S. Census Bureau designated the area around The Woodlands and Conroe as a "large urbanized transit area," defined as having over 200,000 residents, making it eligible to receive federal transportation funds.

=== Incorporation as a city ===
Mitchell's original plan was for The Woodlands to be annexed by the city of Houston, but in the mid-2000s, some residents organized to prevent annexation. To counteract any possible move by the city, a movement began to create an independent city government. However, the formation of an independent government would require authorization by the State of Texas and the City of Houston, as Houston held extraterritorial jurisdiction over the area.

In 2007, two state legislators representing The Woodlands, Sen. Tommy Williams and Rep. q2007 Legislature – House Bill 4109 and Senate Bill 1012. HB 4109 called for a vote to allow expansion of an existing improvement district (now The Woodlands Township) and to allow The Woodlands to collect sales tax, while SB 1012 allowed for the creation of regional agreements between governments. The passage of these bills allows an opportunity for The Woodlands to incorporate itself until 2057. Since 2019, there has been formal discussion of The Woodlands to become an incorporated city. However, as a result of the then ongoing COVID-19 pandemic, these plans were put on hold and resumed in April 2021. In 2020, residents of The Woodlands formed the TownshipFuture PAC. In a referendum on November 2, 2021, residents voted against incorporation by a wide margin, keeping The Woodlands as a township for the foreseeable future.

== Geography ==
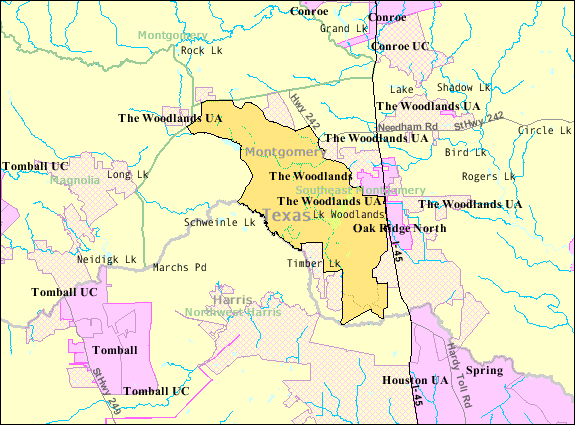
Map of the Woodlands CDP as of the 2000 census

The Woodlands is primarily in Montgomery County, with a small portion in Harris County, bordering Houston. According to the United States Census Bureau, The Woodlands has an area of 43.9 square miles (113.6 km^{2}), of which 43.3 square miles (112.1 km^{2}) are land and 0.58 square miles (1.5 km^{2}), or 1.32%, are water.

The Woodlands is in a heavily forested area, and much of the community has retained trees for shade and decoration. The terrain is essentially flat, with the exception of topographic variations ranging from 125 to 175 feet above sea level between Spring Creek and Flintridge Drive.

=== Villages ===
The Woodlands is organized into eight villages, which are subdivided into neighborhoods. Each village features varying amenities including parks, hike and bike trails, golfing, commercial centers, and a range of residential properties from single family to estates. The Town Center offers dining, shopping, office space, and a central canal modeled after the San Antonio River Walk. The Research Forest district includes a Park and Ride facility and The Woodlands Township Town Hall.

- Alden Bridge
- Cochran's Crossing
- College Park
- Creekside Park
- Grogan's Mill
- Indian Springs
- Panther Creek
- Sterling Ridge

=== Climate ===
The Woodlands has a humid subtropical climate, typical to the Southeast Texas region and Greater Houston. Temperature ranges are within the top decile for census-designated places in the United States. Winter daily highs average approximately 60 degrees Fahrenheit (15°C), daily lows 40 degrees Fahrenheit (4°C); summer daily highs average 94 degrees Fahrenheit (34°C), daily lows 72 (22°C) degrees Fahrenheit. It is part of Wind Zone 2 per the FEMA mapping chart.

=== Protected Areas ===
The Woodlands has 151 urban parks within its boundaries, with all residents being within a ten-minute walk of a park.

The areas surrounding Spring Creek are protected as part of the George Mitchell Nature Preserve, a section of the larger Spring Creek Greenway, the "longest, connected, urban forested corridor in the nation."

The northern part of the CDP borders on the W. Goodrich Jones State Forest. This forest, managed by the Texas A&M Forest Service, serves as a vital habitat for the endangered red-cockaded woodpecker.

== Demographics ==
Historical population
Census	Pop.	Note	%±
1980	8,443		—
1990	29,205		245.9%
2000	55,649		90.5%
2010	93,847		68.6%
2020	114,436		21.9%
U.S. Decennial Census; 1850–1900 1910; 1920 1930 1940; 1950 1960 1970; 1980 1990 2000; 2010 2020

The Woodlands first appeared as a census designated place in the 1980 United States census.

=== Racial and ethnic composition ===
The Woodlands CDP, Texas – Racial and ethnic composition Note: the US Census treats Hispanic/Latino as an ethnic category. This table excludes Latinos from the racial categories and assigns them to a separate category. Hispanics/Latinos may be of any race.
Race / Ethnicity (NH = Non-Hispanic)	Pop 2000	Pop 2010	Pop 2020	% 2000	% 2010	% 2020
White alone (NH)	48,674	73,680	74,477	87.47%	78.51%	65.08%
Black or African American alone (NH)	952	2,191	3,946	1.71%	2.33%	3.45%
Native American or Alaska Native alone (NH)	147	253	215	0.26%	0.27%	0.19%
Asian alone (NH)	1,551	4,581	9,085	2.79%	4.88%	7.94%
Native Hawaiian or Pacific Islander alone (NH)	26	54	78	0.05%	0.06%	0.07%
Other Race alone (NH)	76	176	602	0.14%	0.19%	0.53%
Mixed race or Multiracial (NH)	526	1,415	5,065	0.95%	1.51%	4.43%
Hispanic or Latino (any race)	3,697	11,497	20,968	6.64%	12.25%	18.32%
Total	55,649	93,847	114,436	100.00%	100.00%	100.00%

=== 2020 census ===
As of the 2020 census, The Woodlands had a population of 114,436, with 42,103 households and 31,063 families. The median age was 40.7 years. 26.1% of residents were under the age of 18 and 14.9% of residents were 65 years of age or older. For every 100 females there were 93.7 males, and for every 100 females age 18 and over there were 90.8 males age 18 and over.

There were 42,103 households in The Woodlands, of which 38.7% had children under the age of 18 living in them. Of all households, 64.2% were married-couple households, 11.9% were households with a male householder and no spouse or partner present, and 20.9% were households with a female householder and no spouse or partner present. About 21.0% of all households were made up of individuals and 8.5% had someone living alone who was 65 years of age or older.

There were 45,325 housing units, of which 7.1% were vacant. The homeowner vacancy rate was 1.4% and the rental vacancy rate was 11.3%.

100.0% of residents lived in urban areas, while 0.0% lived in rural areas.

Racial composition as of the 2020 census
Race	Number	Percent
White	78,891	68.9%
Black or African American	4,056	3.5%
American Indian and Alaska Native	457	0.4%
Asian	9,169	8.0%
Native Hawaiian and Other Pacific Islander	89	0.1%
Some other race	4,527	4.0%
Two or more races	17,247	15.1%
Hispanic or Latino (of any race)	20,968	18.3%

=== 2010 census ===
At the 2010 U.S. census, there were 93,847 people living in The Woodlands.

=== 2000 census ===
In 2000, there were 55,649 people, 19,881 households, and 15,546 families. The population density was 2,328.4 inhabitants per square mile (899.0/km^{2}).There were 21,014 housing units at an average density of 897.7 per square mile (346.6/km^{2}). The racial makeup was 92.36% White, 1.75% Black, 0.29% Native American, 2.80% Asian, 0.05% Pacific Islander, 1.43% from other races, and 1.32% from two or more races. Hispanic or Latino of any race were 28% of the population.

There were 19,881 households, out of which 47.1% had children under the age of 18 living with them, 69.2% were married couples living together, 7.2% had a female householder with no husband present, and 21.8% were non-families. 19.1% of all households were made up of individuals, and 7.3% had someone living alone who was 65 years of age or older. The average household size was 2.78 and the average family size was 3.21. At the 2000 U.S. census, 31.8% were under the age of 18, 5.0% from 18 to 24, 30.5% from 25 to 44, 25.1% from 45 to 64, and 7.6% were 65 years of age or older. The median age was 37 years. For every 100 females, there were 92.9 males; for every 100 females age 18 and over there were 88.5 males.

=== Education and income ===
The median income for a household according to the 2020 census was $130,011. The per capita income is $67,290. About 3.9% of the population were below the poverty line. 97.8% of residents 25 years or older are high school graduates or higher. 64.3% of residents 25 years or older have a bachelor’s degree or higher.

=== Religion ===
As of 2016, there were almost 50 centers of worship in The Woodlands, occupying a total of 330 acres (130 ha) of land. As of 2011, the community is majority Christian.

As of 2018, The Woodlands United Methodist Church, now known as The Woodlands Methodist Church, had about 13,000 members in its congregation. It was established in 1978. Pastor Kerry Shook established Fellowship of The Woodlands Church, now known as Woodlands Church, in 1993. Its permanent church building opened on August 19, 2001. Church Project, which holds services in a former Kroger, had an average weekly attendance of 1,500 in 2014. As of 2018 Christ Church United Methodist has about 3,000 members. Circa 2012 Covenant United Methodist Church began its worship services at Timber Creek Elementary School, and by 2016 bought 5 acres (2.0 ha) of land near the entrance of Village of Creekside Park for a permanent 700-seat facility. On December 25, 2001, the Korean Community Church in The Woodlands, with Presbyterian Korean-language services and non-denominational English services, opened. It opened to serve ethnic Koreans in The Woodlands, Conroe, Huntsville, Kingwood, and Spring. Other Protestant, Christian and non-denominational Christian churches in The Woodlands include HopePointe Anglican Church, Kingdom Hall of Jehovah’s Witnesses, Lord of Life Lutheran Church, Trinity Episcopal Church, and Unity of The Woodlands.

Saints Simon and Jude Catholic Parish, the first Catholic church in The Woodlands, was established circa 1980, with its 400 parishioners initially meeting at Knox Junior High School before moving into its permanent building in 1981. As of 2013 it had 3,800 families in its congregation. St. Anthony of Padua, another Catholic church, had 3,020 families in its congregation in 2006, 5,700 families in 2013, and 7,500 in 2026. It operates St. Anthony of Padua Catholic School.

There are two Jewish places of worship, traditional and reformed. Congregation Beth Shalom, established circa 1984 led by Rabbi Edwin C. Goldberg, has about 175 families, and is affiliated with Reform Judaism. Its affiliated organizations are the Association of Reformed Congregations and the Union of American Hebrew Congregations. Chabad of The Woodlands was established in 2011 by Rabbi Mendel and Leah Blecher. It is a branch of the worldwide Chabad Lubavitch movement, offering traditional-style services to contemporary Jewish families. Chabad of The Woodlands inaugurated and sponsors the annual Hanukkah on Market Street celebration, and established the first Jewish preschool in the area.

In 2011, there were 350 Hindu families in The Woodlands. In a 15-year period ending in 2011, the Hindu population in the Woodlands increased by 300%, and Kate Shellnut of the Houston Chronicle stated that according to "Hindu leaders" every year the Hindu population in The Woodlands grows by 20 to 25 families. The Hindu Temple of The Woodlands, a Hindu temple serving the northern part of Greater Houston, was scheduled to open in 2010. Another Hindu temple, Char Dham Hindu Temple, was founded by Surya Sahoo.

Masjid al-Ansaar (Woodlands Islamic Center) of the Islamic Society of Greater Houston (ISGH) was created in 2009, and in 2019 it had 300 parishioners. It is in an unincorporated area outside of The Woodlands.

=== Ethnic groups ===
As of 2017 about 10% of the residents of The Woodlands were of Mexican origins; they numbered at over 10,000. In 2000 wealthy Mexicans began buying houses in The Woodlands for vacation purposes. Large numbers settled in The Woodlands from 2006 to 2014 as the Mexican drug war occurred. In 2017 many wealthy Mexicans in Texas were moving back to Mexico and fewer were moving to The Woodlands. The Rice University Baker Institute director, Tony Payán, stated that uncertainty regarding the Trump Administration's attitudes towards immigration and the decline in value of the Mexican peso were factors.

== Economy ==
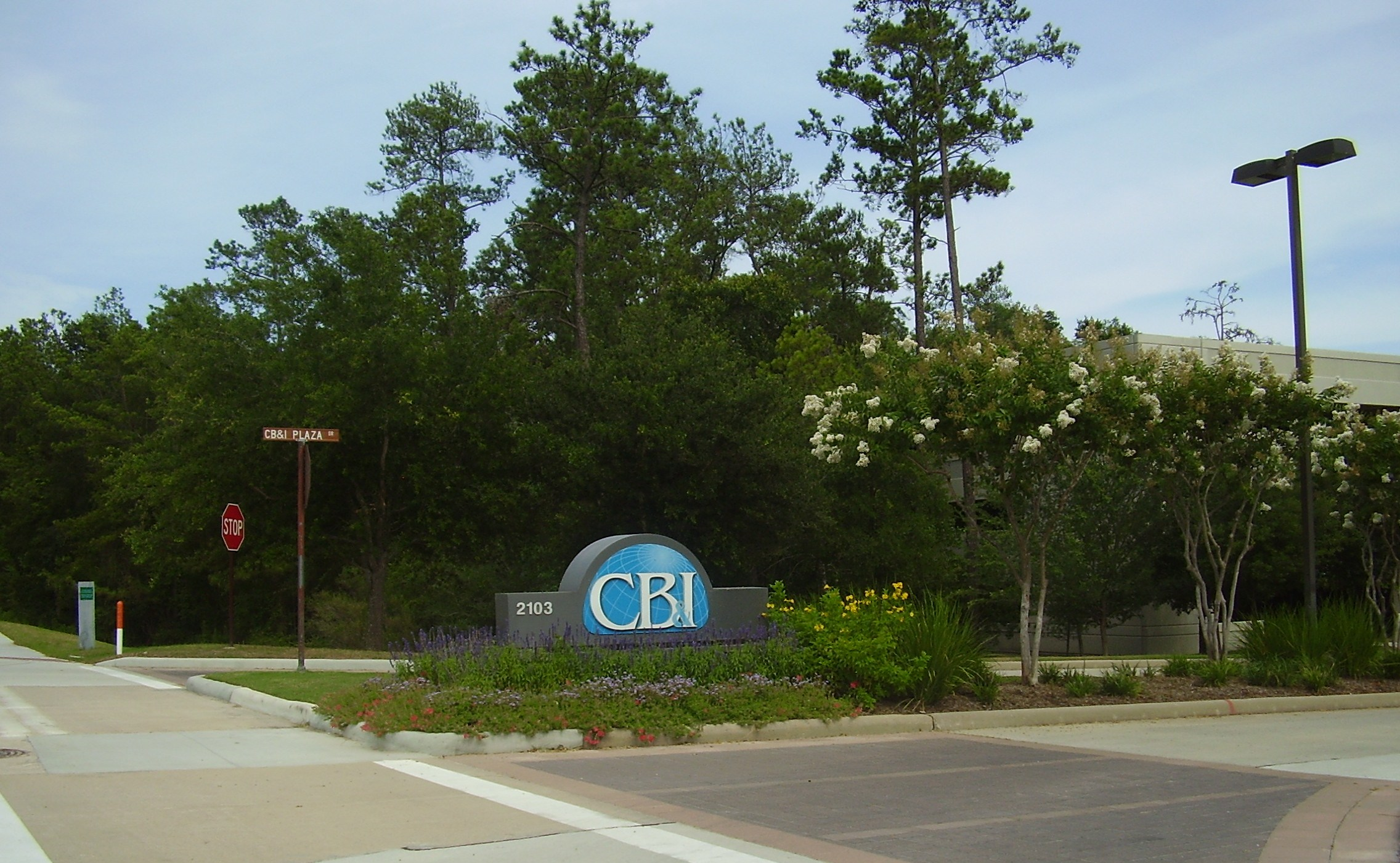
CB&I administrative headquarters

By 2000, a significant amount of corporate office space was under construction. Of the 4,800,000 square feet (450,000 m^{2}) of office space under construction in Greater Houston, over one third was in The Woodlands.

On February 11, 1999, Anadarko Petroleum announced that it would purchase a 7.5-acre (30,000 m^{2}) tract from The Woodlands Land Company, to build a 800,000-square-foot (74,000 m^{2}), 32-story headquarters building, to open in mid-2002. This became Allison Tower, which remains the tallest building in Montgomery County and the tallest structure between Houston and Dallas. As of 2000, the Anadarko building was the largest office project in The Woodlands.

In January 2012, Anadarko Petroleum announced plans to construct a second office tower adjacent to its existing headquarters in The Woodlands. The 31-story building—later named Hackett Tower—includes ten levels of parking and was completed in 2014. Since Anadarko’s acquisition, the tower is now part of the campus operated by Occidental Petroleum.

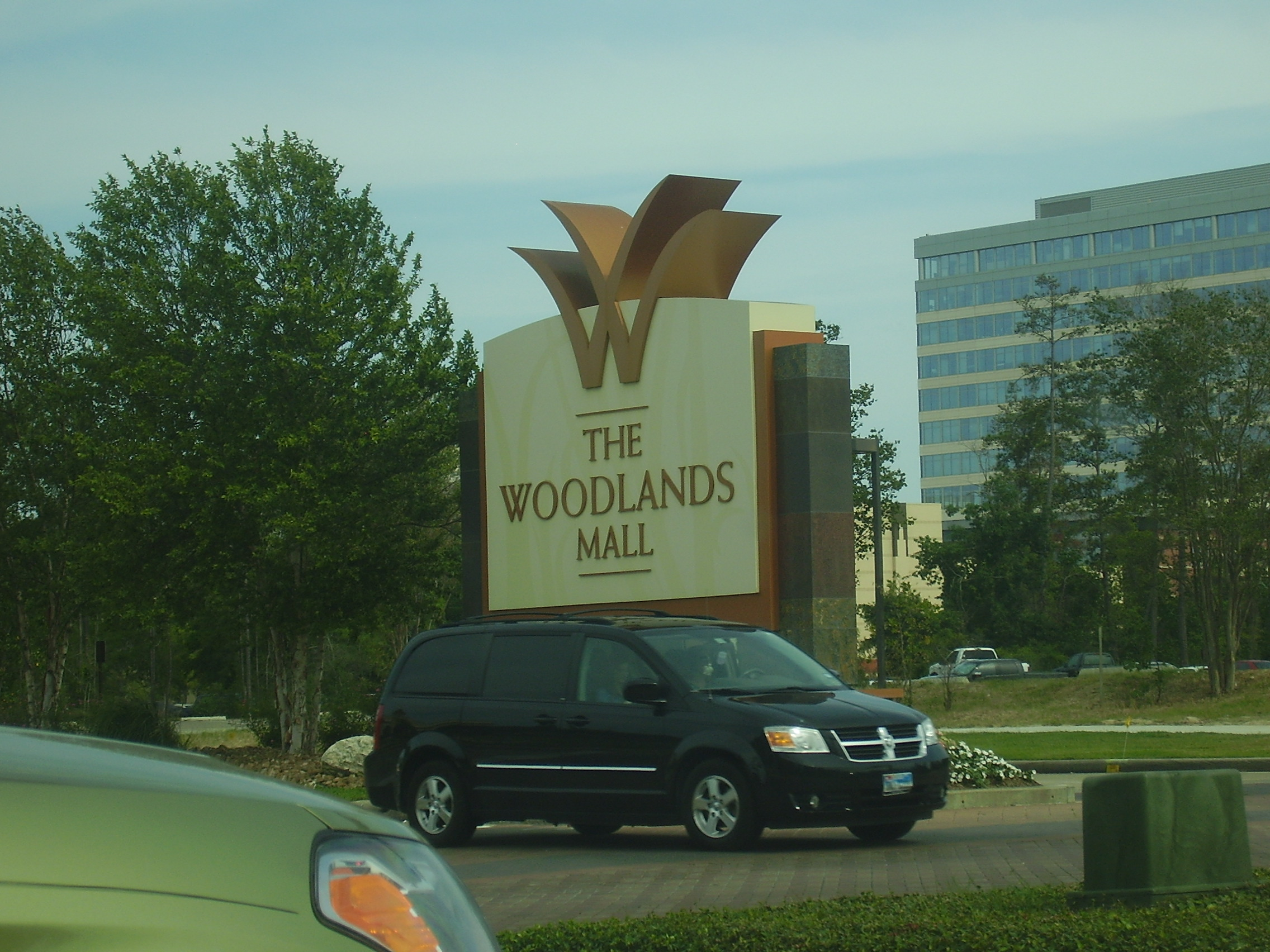
The Woodlands Mall

Chicago Bridge & Iron's (CB&I) worldwide administrative office was in The Woodlands. In 2018 McDermott International, which acquired CB&I, announced that it would sell the headquarters facility in The Woodlands to Howard Hughes Corporation.

In 2000, work began on a 100,000 square feet (9,300 m^{2}) building for Maersk Sealand.

In 2011, ExxonMobil announced plans to construct a new 385-acre campus near the intersection of the Hardy Toll Road and Interstate 45, just south of The Woodlands, within Houston’s extraterritorial jurisdiction (ETJ). Approximately 10,000 employees from the Houston area began relocating to the campus in 2014, with full occupancy reached in 2015.

Other companies based in The Woodlands include Woodforest National Bank, Lexicon Pharmaceuticals, McKesson Corporation, and Huntsman Corporation.

Many wealthy Mexicans who settled in The Woodlands due to rising crime in Mexico had also established businesses in The Woodlands.

== Arts and culture ==
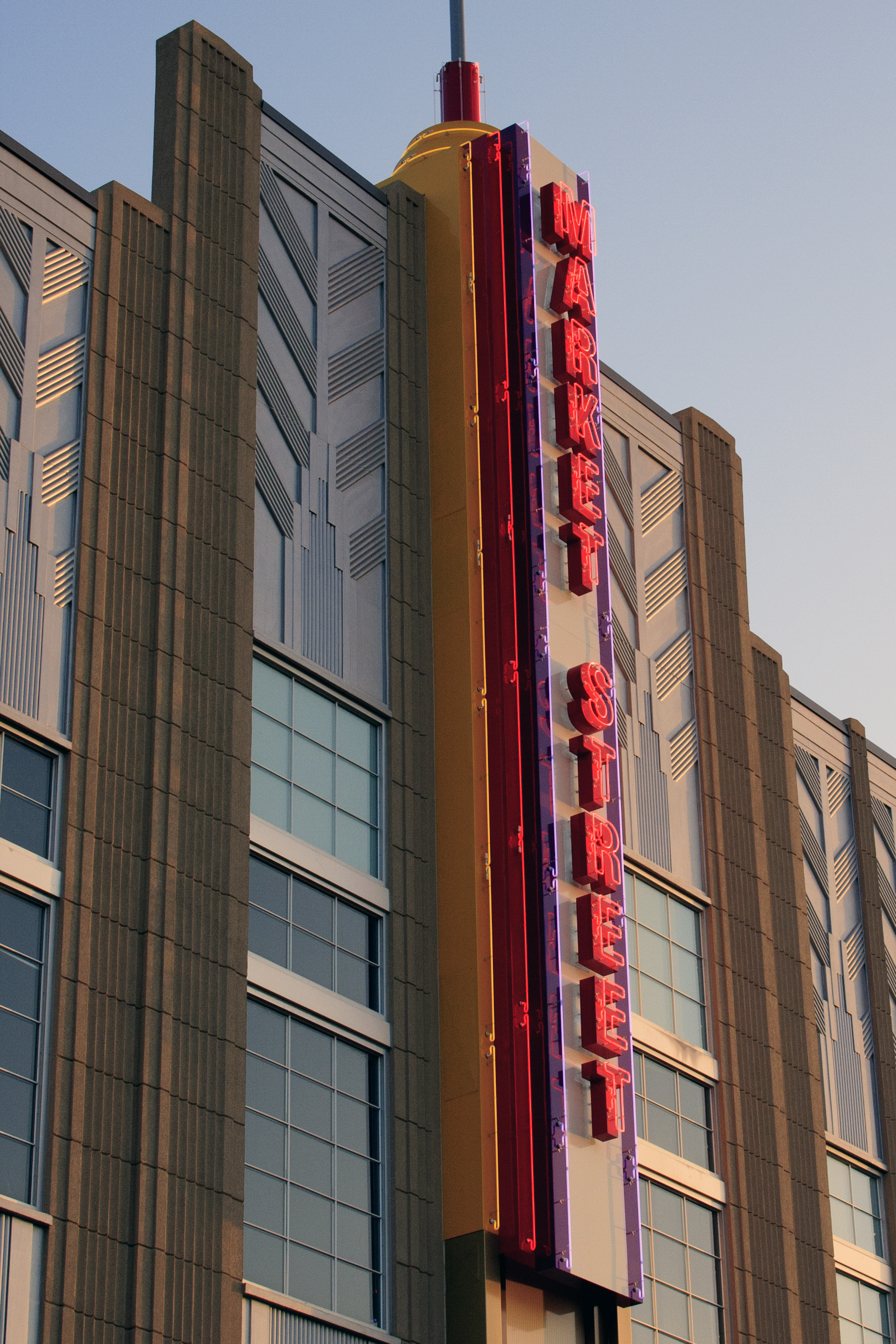
Market Street, a shopping center in The Woodlands

Cultural events include:

- The Cynthia Woods Mitchell Pavilion hosts free concerts by the Houston Symphony, including recurring annual events such as the Star-Spangled Salute for Independence Day and Hocus Pocus Pops for Halloween.
- The Woodlands Waterway, which stretches from The Woodlands Mall to Lake Woodlands, and has lighted sidewalks.
- Market Street, a shopping district with a movie theater, shops and restaurants.
- The Woodlands Mall, which borders the waterway and is adjacent to Market Street, forming a large shopping district.
- Every April, The Woodlands Waterway Arts Festival draws 220 international juried artists.
- The Woodlands Concert Band, established in 2001, performs at local events, and is composed of amateur and professional musicians.

Each village in The Woodlands has its own shopping center.

== Sporting hub ==
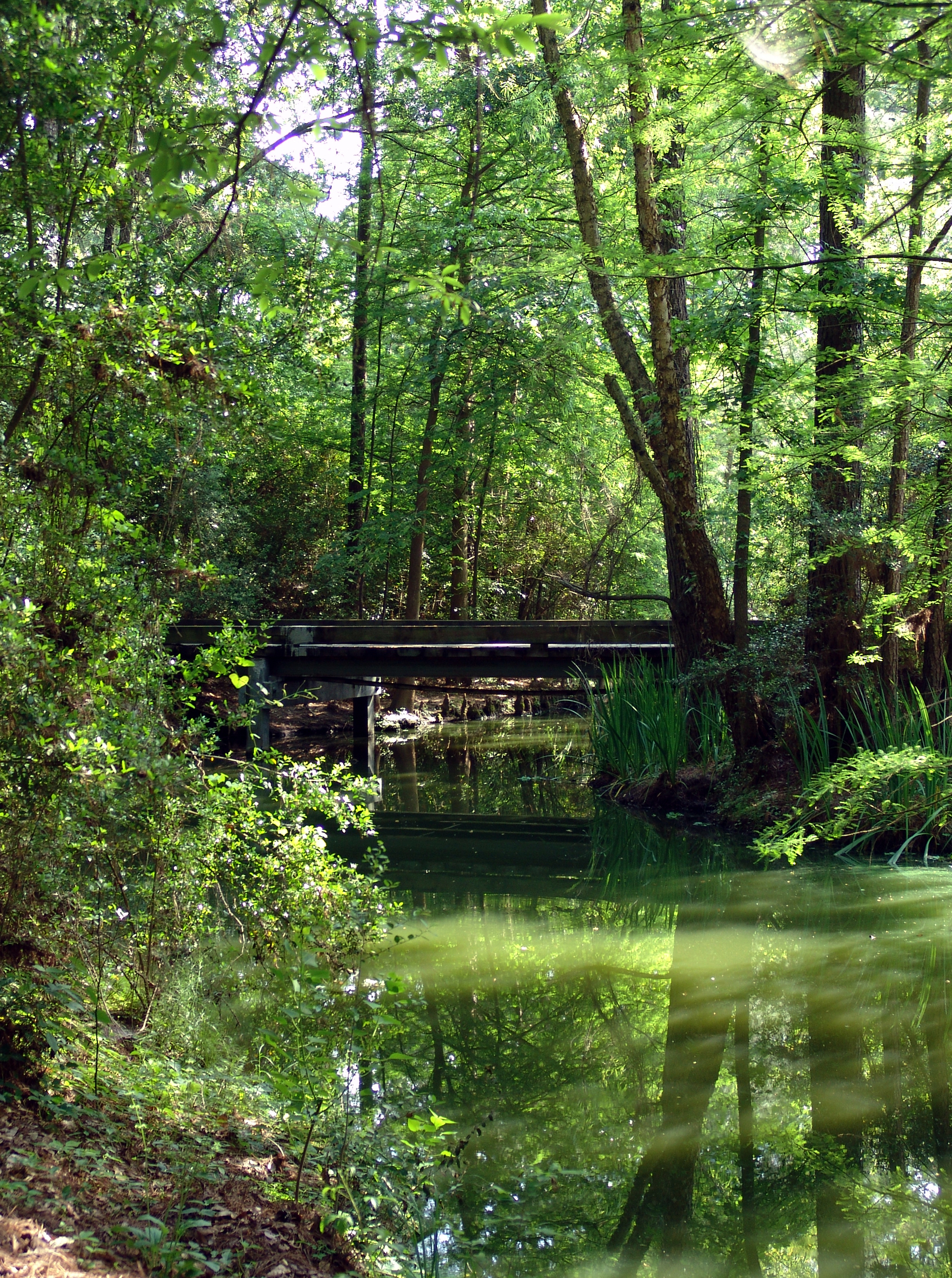
A bridge leading through the forest in The Woodlands

The Woodlands Township maintains numerous parks and facilities and offers thousands of recreation programs, including adult sports leagues and youth activities, and regularly hosts championships in sports such as pickleball, tennis, swimming, and more.

In addition to year-round classes and leagues, The Woodlands hosts popular annual sporting events that attract participants from across the country:

- Memorial Hermann IRONMAN Texas (April) is an annual full-distance triathlon and a global qualifier for the IRONMAN World Championship.
- In addition to the main triathlon, the event often includes complementary community races such as the IRONKIDS Fun Run and the Doggie Dash, introduced in 2023, with a portion of proceeds benefiting the local animal rescue Operation Pets Alive.
- YMCA Dragon Boat Team Challenge (September) is an annual dragon boat racing event held at Northshore Park that benefits The Woodlands Family YMCA and the event raises awareness about drowning prevention.
- Memorial Hermann 10 for Texas (October) is a USA Track and Field (USATF) sanctioned event with a certified 10-mile course.
- Glow and Go 5K (December) is a festive evening race that lights up The Woodlands Waterway with holiday cheer. Participants are encouraged to dress in their most colorful, glowing gear and enjoy a fun, chip-timed 5K course filled with music, lights, and seasonal spirit.
- Crush Rush 5K (February) is a chip-timed race along The Woodlands Waterway and is sanctioned by USA Track and Field (USATF).

== Government ==
The Woodlands Township is a special-purpose district created by the 73rd Texas Legislature in 1993, and is run by a seven-member board of directors who are elected directly by the residents of the township in an at large election, for two year staggered terms. Even though The Woodlands is not a city nor a traditional township government, it still provides limited municipal government services such as trash pickup, parks and recreation, covenant enforcement, fire and rescue services, streetscaping, economic development, and enhanced law enforcement and security patrols.

== Education ==
Most students in the Montgomery County portion attend schools in the Conroe Independent School District. Children residing in the May Valley neighborhood in Sterling Ridge Village attend schools in the Magnolia Independent School District. Children from the Creekside Park Village in Harris County attend the Tomball Independent School District.

Montgomery County Memorial Library System operates two libraries in The Woodlands, the South Branch and the George and Cynthia Woods Mitchell Library. Most schools have the honored rank of an exemplary school, the highest school ranking in Texas. Texas students are administered the STAAR test, a review of general knowledge, which can determine students' promotion to the next grade level.

=== Primary and secondary schools ===
==== Public schools ====
The Woodlands High School (TWHS) serves the western portion of The Woodlands in Montgomery County. TWHS was ranked 626 on Newsweek's 2012 list of America's Best High Schools.

The Woodlands College Park High School, which opened in 2005, serves the eastern portion of The Woodlands in Montgomery County. TWCP was ranked 382 on Newsweek's 2012 list of America's Best High Schools. College Park is also home to the Conroe ISD Academy of Science and Technology, a science and technology based magnet program. Refer to the Conroe School District for specific feeders. Magnolia High School serves pupils residing in May Valley, and Tomball High School serves pupils residing inside the Harris County portion.

Junior high schools

- Montgomery County: Knox Junior High School, McCullough Junior High School
- Harris County: Creekside Park Junior High School

In 2023 TISD had plans to move middle school grades of the Creekside Village area to Tomball, but parents protested. The district shifted and decided instead to move the fifth grade to an addition at Creekside Park Junior High School. The directors of The Woodlands Township had asked that TISD not move the middle school students to Tomball.

Sam Houston State University operates a charter elementary school in the CDP.

==== Private schools ====
By 2015, many private preparatory schools began campus expansions as The Woodlands had an increase in population and corporate office relocations.

- The John Cooper School
- The Woodlands Christian Academy
- St. Anthony of Padua Catholic School (K-8) (of the Roman Catholic Archdiocese of Galveston-Houston)

The closest Catholic high school is Frassati Catholic High School in north Harris County; the planners of the school intended for it to serve The Woodlands.

As of 2019, the British International School of Houston in Greater Katy has a school bus service to The Woodlands.

=== Colleges and universities ===
Lone Star College (originally the North Harris Montgomery Community College District) and Sam Houston State University-The Woodlands Center serve the community. The territory in Conroe ISD joined the community college district in 1991, and the territory in Tomball ISD had joined the district in 1982. The headquarters of the Lone Star College System are located in The Woodlands and in unincorporated Montgomery County, Texas. The district moved to its current location on March 17, 2003. Our Lady of the Lake University, a private non-profit university based in San Antonio, moved its Houston Campus to The Woodlands in 2011.

== Media ==
In 2007, The Bracelet of Bordeaux was filmed in The Woodlands. The cast and crew were largely composed of local residents, and the film was part of a larger effort to generate interest in using The Woodlands and Houston as shooting locations for major motion pictures.

== Infrastructure ==
Law enforcement in Montgomery County is provided by the Montgomery County Sheriff's Office and the Texas Highway Patrol. The Harris County portion is covered by Harris County Constable Precinct #4.

The Woodlands Township runs two transit services in The Woodlands: The Woodlands Express, which provides commuter service to the Central Business District of Houston, the Texas Medical Center, and Greenway Plaza from three park and ride lots in The Woodlands, and the free daily Town Center Trolley.
