= Allison Tower =

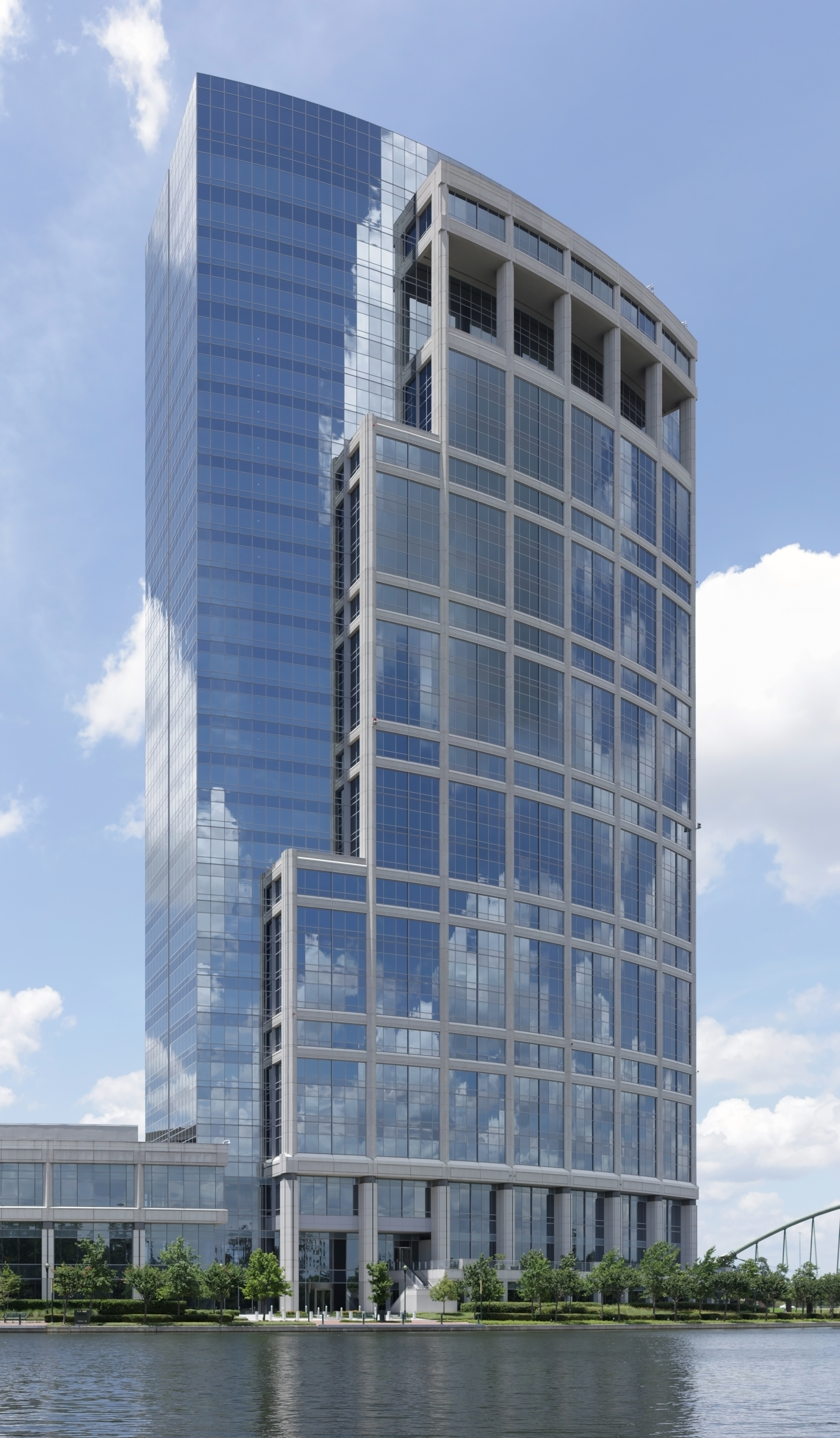
- Allison Tower
- Interactive map of the Allison Tower area

General information
- Status: Completed
- Type: Office
- Architectural style: Postmodern
- Location: 1201 Lake Robbins Drive The Woodlands, Texas 77380, United States
- Coordinates: 30°09′37″N 95°27′10″W
- Construction started: 2001
- Completed: 2002
- Opening: 2002
- Owner: Allison Rudisill

Height
- Roof: 439 ft (133.81 m)

Technical details
- Floor count: 32
- Floor area: 807,000 sq ft (75,000 m^{2})
- Lifts/elevators: 18 (ThyssenKrupp Elevator U.S.A.)

Design and construction
- Architect: Gensler
- Developer: Friendswood Development Co.

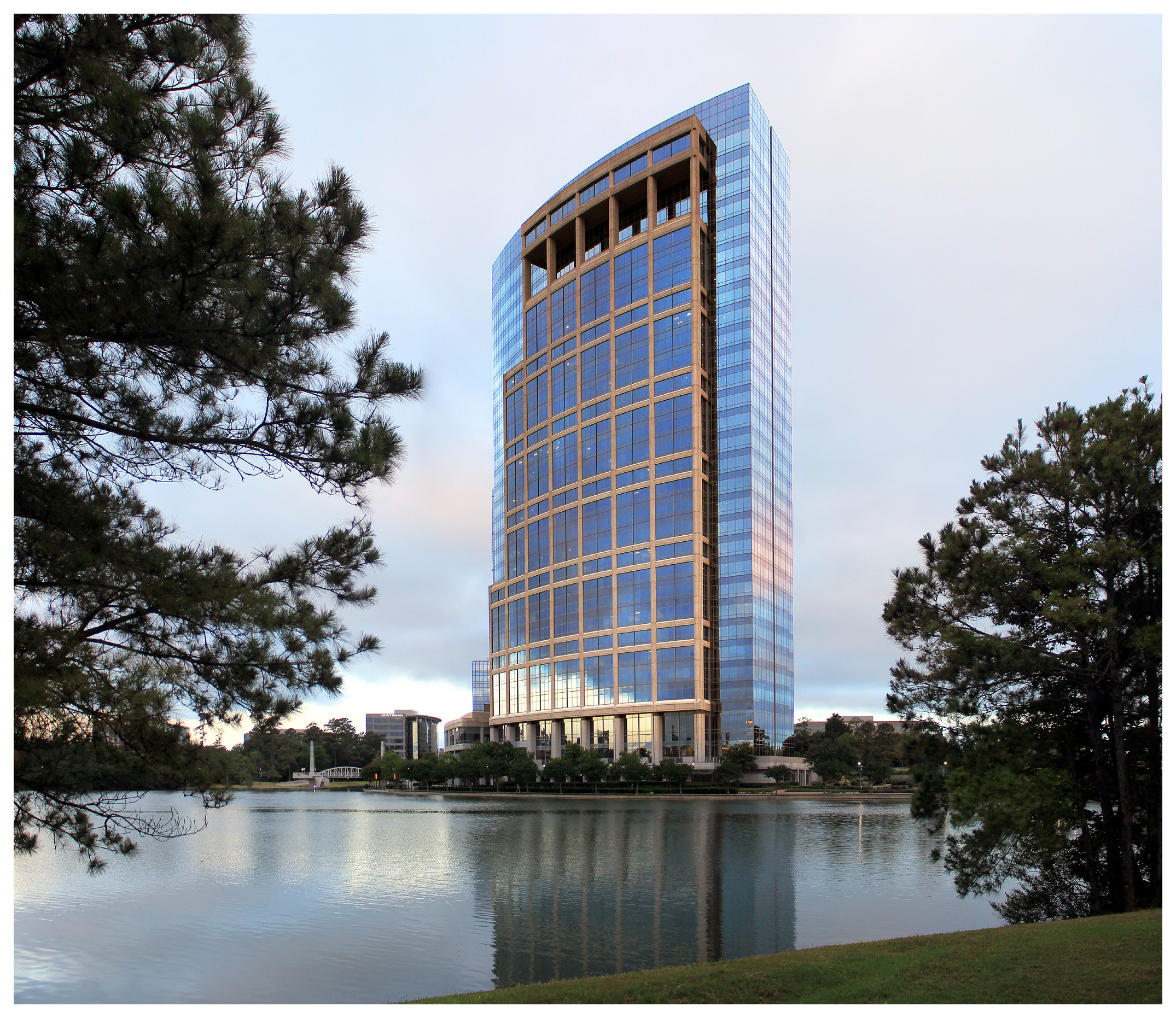

Allison Tower, formerly Anadarko Tower, is a 32-story, 439 feet (133.81 m) skyscraper located in The Woodlands, Texas. It is currently the tallest building in Montgomery County, Texas and the tallest building between Houston and Dallas. It also was the first office complex in The Woodlands, Texas to achieve LEED (Leadership in Energy and Environmental Design) certification by the U.S. Green Building Council as verification that the facility meets the highest green building and performance measures. The Anadarko Tower also has earned the Energy Star Award from the U.S. Environmental Protection Agency for its savings on energy consumption.

== Overview ==
The tower was designed by the architect firm Gensler, and was developed by Patrinely Group. Construction was harsh because Marek Brothers Systems were given an aggressive 12-month deadline. The tower consist of 240 miles (390 km) of structural metals, 3 million board feet of various drywall components, is sprayed with 5,000 gallons of textured elastomeric sealants and is wrapped in 60,000 square feet (5,600 m^{2}) of specialty fabrics. The 807,000 sq ft (75,000 m^{2}) tower now serves as offices for Occidental Petroleum and is currently owned by real estate developer Howard Hughes Holdings.

== Name Change ==
An adjacent tower is located next to Allison (Anadarko) Tower to accommodate Anadarko's manpower expansion. During a Summer of 2013 "Topping Off" Ceremony Anadarko Tower was renamed Allison Tower for Robert Allison, Jr., the first CEO of Anadarko Petroleum. The new tower is dedicated to James Hackett, another former Anadarko Petroleum CEO, and deemed Hackett Tower.
