= Ray R. Irani =

American businessman

Ray R. Irani (born January 13, 1935) is the former chairman and chief executive officer of Occidental Petroleum. He has worked at Occidental Petroleum for over 20 years, serving as a director since 1984, chief operating officer (president) from 1984 to 1990, and chairman and chief executive officer from 1990. During his early years, he worked with Occidental CEO Armand Hammer, who at age 91, named Irani his successor in February 1990. According to Forbes.com, his five-year total compensation between 2001 and 2005 was $127,447,000. In 2006, after a rise in oil prices, Irani earned a total of $460 million.

== Personal life ==
Irani was born in Lebanon and is of Palestinian origin. He received a Bachelor of Science degree in chemistry at the American University of Beirut in 1953. He moved in the same year to Los Angeles, California, and at age 18, began graduate studies in physical chemistry at the University of Southern California. He received his PhD in 1957. He subsequently worked as a researcher for the Monsanto Company until 1967 and joined the Shamrock Corporation. Prior to working for Occidental, he was president and chief operating officer of Olin Corporation, a chemicals and metals company.

Irani is an honorary fellow of the American Institute of Chemists and is a member of the Council on Foreign Relations. He is currently a trustee of USC and co-chair of the board of trustees of the American University of Beirut. USC named a primary life sciences building as Ray R. Irani Hall on February 9, 2007. In February 2012, Irani, was elected as a member of the National Academy of Engineering. He was recognized "for leadership in the petrochemical industry and processes for applications of particulate systems." This is considered the highest honor in engineering in the United States.

== Career at Occidental ==
Irani was brought to Occidental in 1983 to help its struggling chemicals division, and soon was promoted to president, replacing a series of presidents fired by Hammer. By 1988, the media reported that Irani and his team were running the day-to-day operations of the company on behalf of the then 90-year-old Hammer. In 2008 Irani was awarded options worth $392 million.

Irani made news in 2007, when it was revealed that his total compensation for the 2006 year topped $450 million. His base salary was $1.3 million. Occidental justified the compensation by pointing to the stock price, which had risen from $9 a share when Irani succeeded Hammer to $48.60 at the end of 2006, and to the company's market capitalization, which grew from $32.1 billion at the end of 2005 to $42.5 billion at the end of 2006. His compensation in 2009 totaled $31.4 million, including $1,170,000 in salary and $24,758,827 in stock. According to the Associated Press, within the last decade, Irani has received $857 million.

Irani put funds into an overseas tax shelter arranged by Deutsche Bank AG that the IRS later deemed an illegal tax avoidance scheme. The Occidental Chairman opposed the U.S. Department of Justice subpoena of Deutsche Bank AG records as part of an investigation of myCFO Inc. His appeal was rejected by the U.S. Court of Appeals in 2006. Occidental's board of directors took no action against Irani despite the IRS ruling. An Occidental spokesman said that Irani's participation in the tax avoidance scheme was a personal matter and was not a violation of the company's code of conduct policy.

Irani was awarded a $900,000 cash bonus by the Occidental board of directors for exceptional performance in implementing a cost-cutting initiative (including reduction in force job terminations) in anticipation of a "world-wide economic deterioration." This was awarded on a discretionary basis by the Occidental compensation committee and not by any company performance metrics. Chazen collected $38,080,344 and Irani $76,107,010 in fiscal year 2010, nearly doubling his 2009 compensation despite shareholder outrage over the Occidental board of directors executive pay policies.

Irani retired as CEO on May 10, 2011, after the California State Teachers' Retirement System and Relational Investors, two major institutional Occidental Investors, objected to the company's compensation policies and announced plans to replace long-term board members who were described as "ossified" in a letter written in protest of Irani's salary. They also termed Irani's salary a "corporate giveaway program."

Irani's salary was considered excessive and not truly performance based for decades by a number of corporate governance authorities who noted that Irani's compensation had exceeded that of the head of energy giant ExxonMobil, Rex Tillerson, who led a company that has a market cap that was five times larger than Occidental Petroleum.

In 2010, former CFO and later president Stephen Chazen was named CEO of Occidental to replace Irani, who planned to stay on as executive chairman until 2014.

Irani was removed from the board of directors of Occidental on May 3, 2013.

== KB Home backdating scandal ==
Irani was a KB Home director for 15 years until November 2007. Irani chaired the KB Home executive compensation committee during the time period when CEO Bruce Karatz lied about the company's practice of backdating options. Karatz was subsequently indicted and convicted April 21, 2010 on federal charges stemming from his actions and sanctioned by the SEC in a separate civil action. The KB Home shareholders expressed their lack of confidence in the board and the compensation committee by a 19% opposition vote against Irani, who resigned from the KB Home board of directors after 15 years of service. Occidental offered no explanation for his resignation in their proxy statement.
