= Hackett Tower =

Office building in Houston, Texas, U.S.

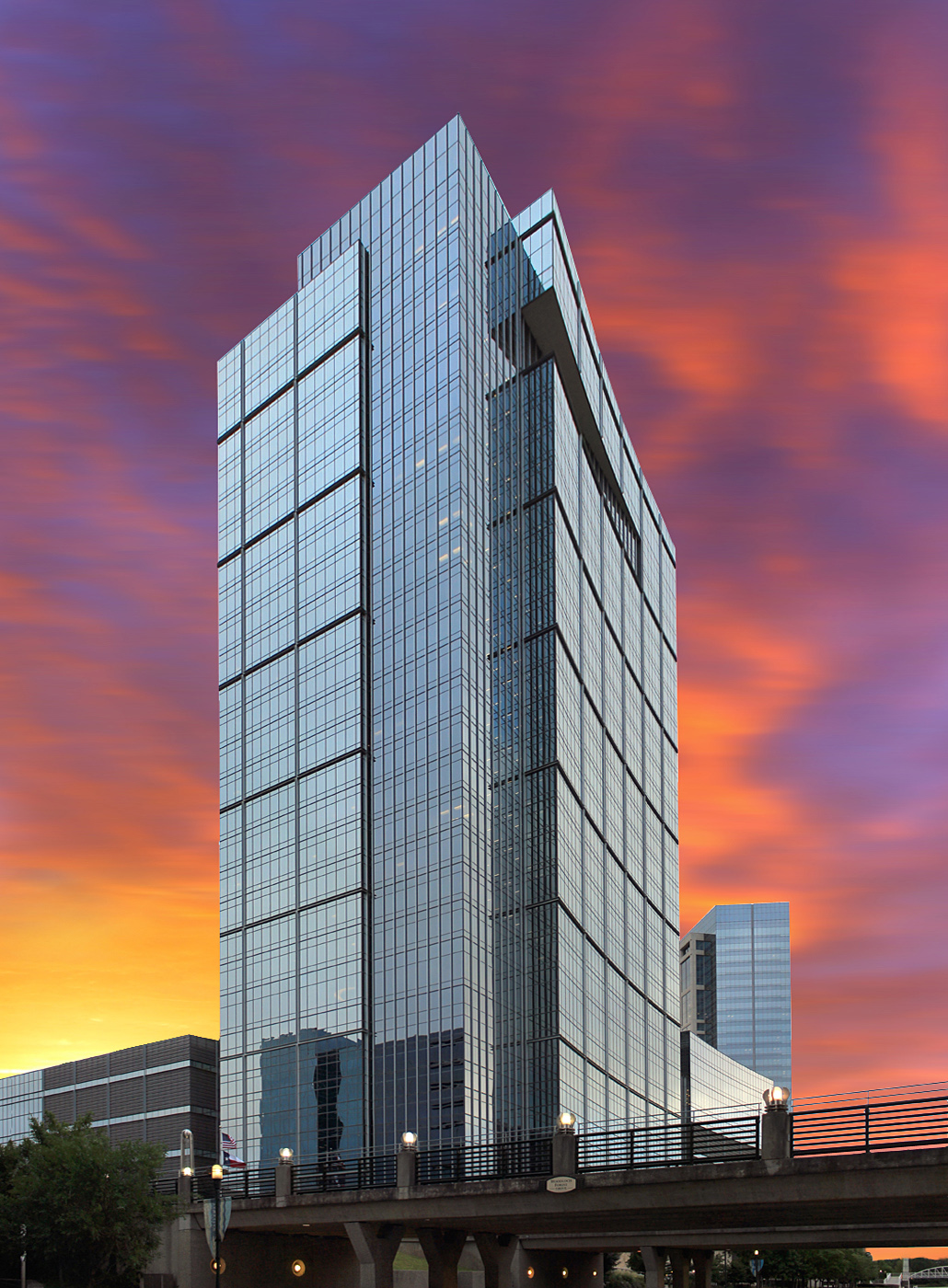
- Hackett Tower
- Interactive map of the Hackett Tower area

General information
- Status: Completed
- Type: Office
- Architectural style: Postmodern
- Location: 9950 Woodloch Forest Drive The Woodlands, Texas 77380, United States
- Coordinates: 30°09′37″N 95°27′10″W
- Construction started: 2012
- Completed: 2014
- Opening: 2014
- Owner: PatrinelyGroup

Height
- Roof: 408.2 ft (124.42 m)

Technical details
- Floor count: 31

Design and construction
- Architect: Gensler
- Developer: PatrinelyGroup

Hackett Tower, also known as Anadarko Tower II, is a 31-story 408 feet (124.36 m) skyscraper located in The Woodlands, Texas. It is currently the second tallest building in Montgomery County, Texas, after Allison Tower. It is certified under the U.S. Green Building Council's Leadership in Energy and Environmental Design program.

== Overview ==
Following the construction of Allison Tower in 2002 and the growth of Anadarko Petroleum, construction of Hackett Tower began in 2012 to house up to 1,700 employees and staff. The tower is named after James Hackett, a former CEO of Anadarko Petroleum. Hackett Tower contains a full-service dining area and coffee bar. The building includes its own conference floor with dozens of meeting rooms in a variety of sizes. The fitness center features a basketball court, fully equipped gym and locker rooms, which building users describe as a neat amenity for their workforces to utilize. In addition, outdoor green space is included on the more than 7 acres of land on which the tower is located.
