= Atum gas field =

Natural gas field offshore Cabo Delgado Province, Mozambique

Atum
- Country: Mozambique
- Region: Cabo Delgado Province
- Offshore/onshore: offshore
- Operator: Occidental Petroleum

Field history
- Discovery: 2012
- Start of production: 2012

Production
- Current production of gas: 5.8×10^{6} m^{3}/d 200×10^{6} cu ft/d 2×10^{9} m^{3}/a (71×10^{9} cu ft/a)
- Estimated gas in place: 857×10^{9} m^{3} 30×10^{12} cu ft

The Atum gas field is a natural gas field located offshore the Cabo Delgado Province of Mozambique. Discovered in 2012, it was developed by Anadarko Petroleum, determining it to have initial total proven reserves of the Atum gas field are around 30 trillion ft^{3} (857 km^{3}). It began production of natural gas and condensates later that year, with a production rate of around 200 million ft^{3}/day (5.8×10^{5} m^{3}).
