= Maurel & Prom =

French oil company

Etablissements Maurel et Prom S.A.
- Type: Public (Société Anonyme)
- Traded as: Euronext Paris: MAU; CAC Mid 60
- ISIN: FR0000051070
- Industry: Oil and Gas Drilling and Exploration. Shipping and Trade (until 1970). 1970-1995: oil, mining, forestry, food processing.
- Founded: 1831
- Headquarters: Paris, France
- Key people: John Anis, chairman Olivier de Langavant, CEO, Jean-Philippe Hagry, COO
- Number of employees: 595
- Website: www.maureletprom.fr

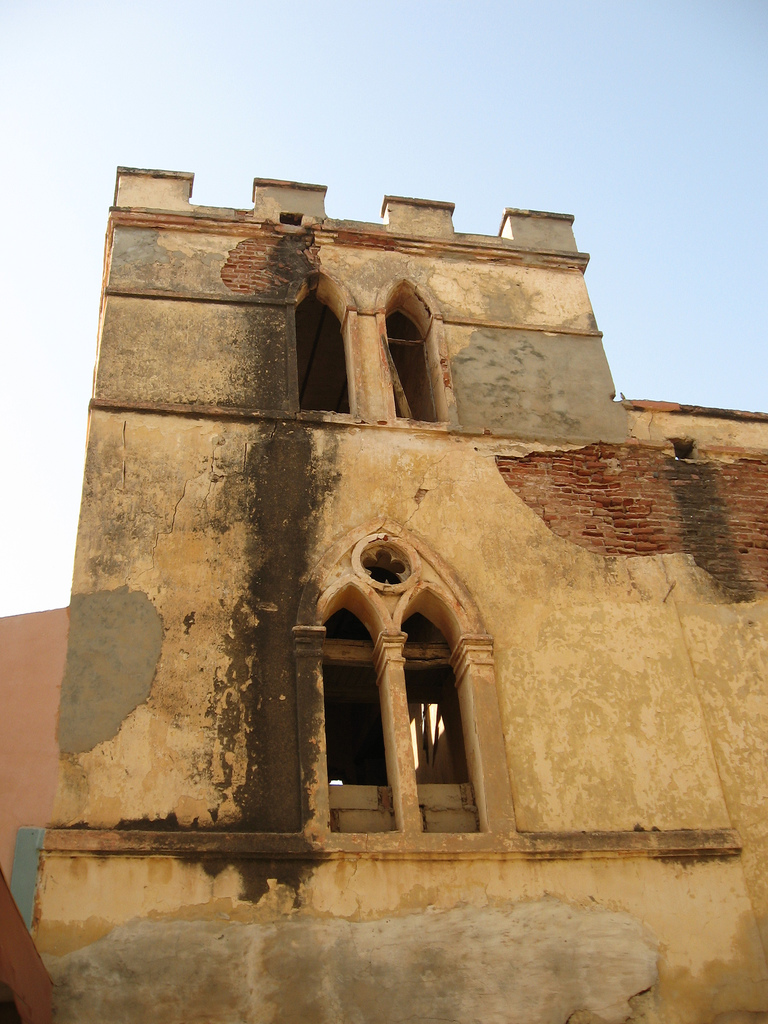
Former building of Maurel et Prom, at Saint-Louis, Senegal

Maurel & Prom is an oil company specialising in the production of hydrocarbons. It is listed on Euronext Paris and has its registered office in Paris.

The Group generates most of its business in Africa through the exploitation of onshore production assets (in Gabon and Tanzania) and a significant stake in SEPLAT, one of Nigeria’s leading indigenous operators.

== History ==
Historically, Maurel & Prom was based in Bordeaux and was one of France's largest family-run shipping and foreign trade houses. It had trading interests throughout the French colonial empire, which included trading houses in Saint-Louis, Senegal, and modern Guinea, Gambia, Mali and Ivory Coast. The company changed its focus to agribusiness in 1986. It pivoted to oil exploration and production in 1998.

Since 16 February 2017 Maurel & Prom has been backed by PIEP, a subsidiary of the Indonesian state oil company Pertamina, and aims to become the international development platform for the upstream activities of Pertamina and PIEP.

In January 2019, the company, after having finalized the previous month the takeover of a 40% stake held by Shell in the joint company Petroregional del Lago, the company which exploits the Urdaneta West oil field, located on Lake Maracaibo (Venezuela), announces that it wants to co-finance an investment project of 400 million dollars (350 million euros) to develop the production of this joint company.

In January 2026, it was announced that Maurel & Prom had completed the acquisition of a 61% working interest and operatorship in the producing Sinu-9 gas block in the Lower Magdalena Valley, Colombia. The transaction, approved by Colombia’s hydrocarbons regulator in December 2025, consolidated interests acquired from multiple partners and established Maurel & Prom as operator of the licence.

== Assets Portfolio ==
- France (Headquarters)

- Italia: Exploration & Appraisal

- Colombia: Exploration & Appraisal

- Venezuela: Production

- Nigeria (20.46% stake in Seplat): Production

- Gabon: Exploration & Production

- Angola: Production

- Namibia: Exploration & Appraisal

- Tanzania: Production, Exploration & Appraisal

== Shareholding ==
On December 31,2021:

- PIEP: 71.09%
- Individual investors: 18.57%
- Institutional investors: 6.08%
- Treasury shares: 1.81%
- Employees: 0.76%
- Others: 1.68%

== References - Contemporary company ==
- Etablissements Maurel et Prom S.A. website.
- dailyestimate.com Gabon: Energy profile, Tuesday, November 6, 2007.
- “Membres du conseil et fonctions”

== References - History ==
- Andrew, C.M. & Kanya-Forstner, A.S.; "French Business and the French Colonialists." The Historical Journal, Vol. 19, No. 4 (Dec., 1976), pp. 981–1000
- Barrows, Leland C.; General Faidherbe, the Maurel and Prom Company, and French Expansion in Senegal. Dissertation Abstracts International 35 8 (1975).
- Barrows. Leland C.; "Faidherbe and Senegal: A Critical Discussion". African Studies Review, Vol. 19, No. 1 (Apr., 1976), pp. 95–117.
- Gellar, Sheldon; Structural Changes and Colonial Dependency: Senegal, 1885-1945. Sage: London (1976).
- Hopkins, A.G.; "Imperial Business in Africa. Part I: Sources." The Journal of African History, Vol. 17, No. 1 (1976), pp. 29–48
- McLane, Margaret O.; "Commercial Rivalries and French Policy on the Senegal River, 1831-1858." African Economic History, No. 15 (1986), pp. 39–67.
- Marfaing, Laurence; L'Evolution du commerce au Senegal, 1820-1930. Paris (1992)
- Newbury, C.W.; "The Protectionist Revival in French Colonial Trade: The Case of Senegal." The Economic History Review, New Series, Vol. 21, No. 2 (Aug., 1968), pp. 337–348.
- Niaré, Djibril Issa; CONTRIBUTION À L'HISTOIRE ÉCONOMIQUE DU SOUDAN FRANÇAIS :LE COMMERCE COLONIAL :1870-1960. Université de Bamako Faculté des Lettres, Langues, Arts et Sciences Humaines (2007)
- Péhaut, Yves; "Les maisons de négoce bordelaises face aux mutations du négoce dans les années 1920-1960 (Maurel et Prom)", in BONIN Hubert, CAHEN Michel (eds), Négoce blanc en Afrique noire. L'évolution du commerce à longue distance en Afrique noire du 18e au 20e siècles. Paris, Société française d'histoire d'outre-mer - Alterna, 2001.
- Péhaut, Yves; Le réseau d’influence bordelais : la "doyenne" Maurel & Prom jusqu’en 1914 (doc) or Le réseau d’influence bordelais : la "doyenne" Maurel & Prom jusqu’en 1914 (pdf).
