= Anadarko Petroleum =

American energy company (1959–2019)

Anadarko Petroleum Corporation
- Type: Subsidiary
- Traded as: NYSE: APC
- Industry: Petroleum industry
- Founded: 1959; 67 years ago
- Defunct: August 8, 2019; 7 years ago
- Fate: Acquired by Occidental Petroleum
- Headquarters: Allison Tower; The Woodlands, Texas, U.S.
- Key people: Robert A. Walker, Chairman and CEO; Robert G. Gwin, President
- Products: Petroleum; Natural gas Natural gas liquids
- Production output: 666 thousand barrels of oil equivalent (4,070,000 GJ) per day
- Revenue: ▲US$13.070 billion (2018)
- Net income: ▲US$0.752 billion (2018)
- Total assets: ▼US$40.376 billion (2018)
- Total equity: ▼US$8.496 billion (2018)
- Number of employees: 4,700 (2018)
- Parent: Occidental Petroleum

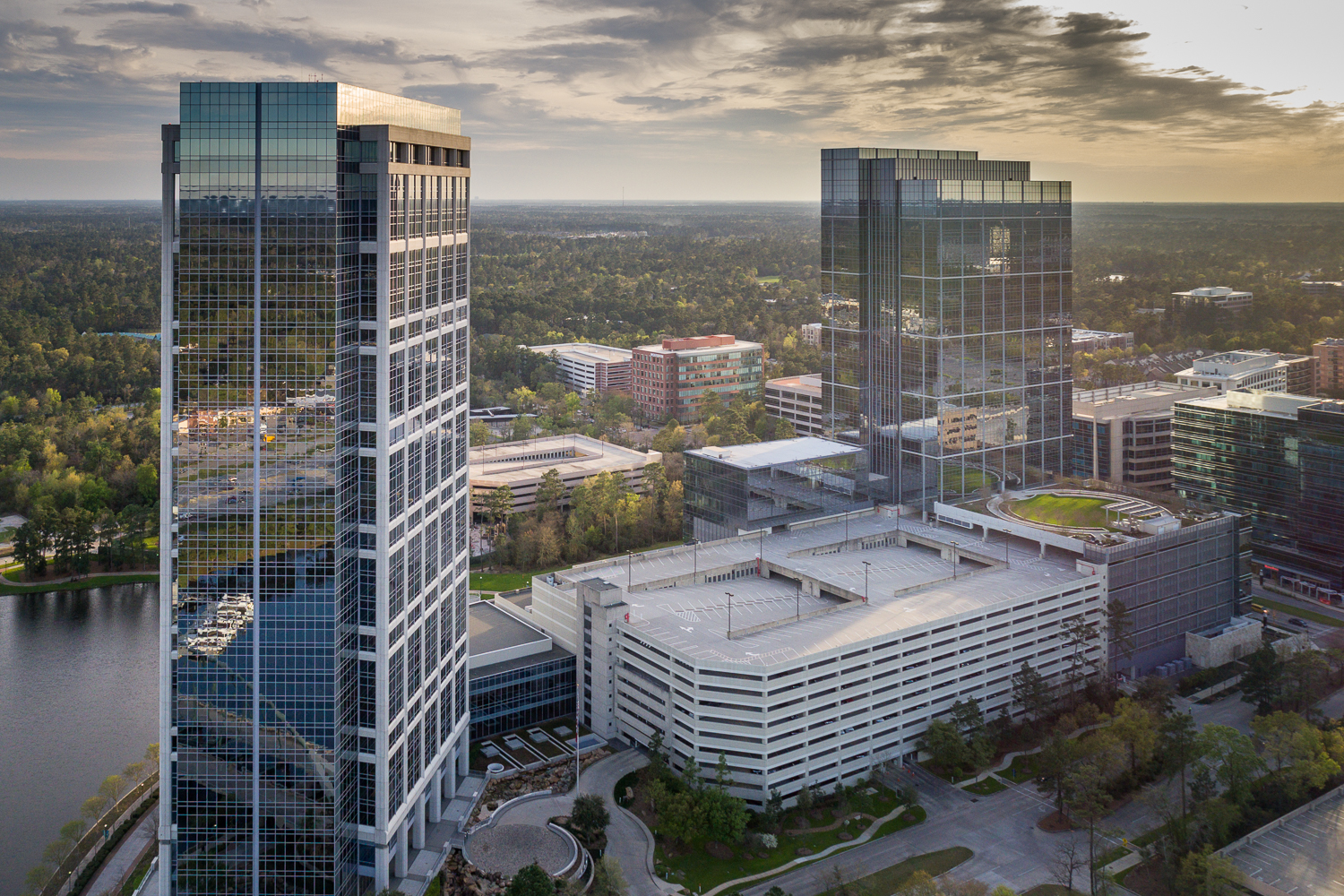
An aerial view of Allison Tower and Hackett Tower, the two buildings that serve as the headquarters for Anadarko Petroleum Corporation.

Anadarko Petroleum Corporation was a company engaged in hydrocarbon exploration. It was organized in Delaware and headquartered in two skyscrapers in The Woodlands, Texas: the Allison Tower and the Hackett Tower, both named after former CEOs of the company. In 2019, the company was acquired by Occidental Petroleum.

The company was the subject of multiple environmental cases, including the largest environmental contamination settlement in American history - the 2014 settlement related to the former Tronox subsidiary of Kerr McGee, a company purchased by Anadarko in 2006.

In addition to exploration and production, the company engaged in petroleum and natural gas gathering, processing, treating, and transportation. The company also participated in the hard minerals business through its ownership of non-operated joint ventures and royalty arrangements. As of December 31, 2018, the company had approximately 1.473 billion barrels of oil equivalent (9.01×10^{9} GJ) of proved reserves, 45% of which was oil reserves, 37% of which was natural gas, and 18% was natural gas liquids. In 2018, the company produced 666 thousand barrels of oil equivalent (4,070,000 GJ) per day.

The company's operations in the United States accounted for 86% of total sales volumes during 2018 and 88% of total proved reserves at year-end 2018. In the United States, the company had major holdings in the Delaware Basin, where it had over 580,000 gross acres, primarily in the Cline Shale; the Denver Basin, where it had more than 400,000 net acres; operating 4,600 vertical wells and 1,400 horizontal wells, and in Greater Natural Buttes, Utah, where it had approximately 2,850 wells.

The company's international operations accounted for 14% of total sales volumes during 2018 and 12% of total proved reserves at year-end 2018. The company had holdings in Algeria, Ghana, Mozambique, Colombia, and Ivory Coast. In the 2019 Forbes Global 2000, Anadarko Petroleum was ranked as the 587th -largest public company in the world.

== History ==
Anadarko was formed in 1959 as a subsidiary of Panhandle Eastern Corporation Pipe Line Company after the discovery of large amounts of natural gas in the Anadarko Basin, which underlies the western part of the state of Oklahoma and the Texas Panhandle, and extending into southwestern Kansas and southeastern Colorado.

In 1986, Panhandle Eastern Corporation distributed its interests in Anadarko to its shareholders via a corporate spin-off, and Anadarko became a public company.

In 1999, the company purchased a 7.5-acre (30,000 m^{2}) tract in The Woodlands, Texas from the Woodlands Land Company to build an 800,000-square-foot (74,000 m^{2}), 32-story headquarters building, on the site. In 2012, the company began construction of another office tower adjacent to its headquarters. The company named its two office towers after former CEOs. The buildings were completed in 2014.

In April 2000, the company acquired Union Pacific Resources in a $4.4 billion transaction.

In June 2001, the company acquired Berkeley Petroleum Corporation for C$1.2 billion plus the assumption of C$400 million in debt.

In December 2003, Robert J. Allison Jr. resigned as chief executive officer and was replaced by James T. Hackett, previously the chief operating officer of Devon Energy.

In June 2006, the company acquired Western Gas Resources in a $5.3 billion cash transaction.

In August 2006, the company acquired Kerr-McGee for $16 billion in cash.

In January 2007, the company sold assets in West Texas for $1 billion.

In February 2007, the company sold assets in Oklahoma and Texas for $860 million.

In December 2008, the company sold its 50% interest in the Peregrino heavy oil field offshore Brazil to Statoil for $1.4 billion.

In January 2012, the company sold midstream assets to Western Gas Partners for $483 million.

In January 2012, the company announced the discovery of a significant natural gas field, the Collier gas field, offshore Mozambique.

In May 2012, a planned CEO succession of Al Walker occurred, with Jim Hackett becoming Executive Chairman until May 2013, when Hackett retired to pursue a master's degree in theology. Al Walker became Chairman as well as CEO in May 2013.

In 2015, the company made an offer to acquire Apache Corporation, but the offer was rejected.

In February 2016, the company sold its interest in the Springfield oil and gas gathering system near the Eagle Ford shale for $750 million to Western Gas Partners.

In March 2016, the company announced layoffs affecting 1,000 employees or 17% of its staff. The layoffs were the result of weak commodity prices.

In December 2016, the company acquired assets in the Gulf of Mexico from Freeport-McMoRan. The company also announced the sale of its assets in the Marcellus Shale.

In January 2017, the company sold its assets in the Eagle Ford to Sanchez Energy and The Blackstone Group for $2.3 billion.

In June 2019, the company and the co-venturers in Mozambique’s Offshore Area 1 proceeded to start the Area 1 Mozambique LNG project, Mozambique's first onshore LNG development, to support the development of the Golfinho gas field and Atum gas field.

In August 2019, the company was acquired by Occidental Petroleum after Occidental outbid Chevron Corporation.

== Environmental record ==
In December 2016, Anadarko was ranked as among the 14th best of 92 oil, gas, and mining companies on indigenous rights and resource extraction in the Arctic by the Norwegian Institute of International Affairs.

=== Deepwater Horizon oil spill involvement ===
Anadarko owned a 25% non-operating minority interest in the Macondo Prospect, which was 65% owned and operated by BP, and was affected by the Deepwater Horizon oil spill in 2010. Under the joint operating agreement, Anadarko was required to pay costs related to any incident in proportion to its 25% ownership—except when caused by the operating partner's gross negligence or willful misconduct. Anadarko contended that gross negligence or willful misconduct by BP led to the explosion.

==== Settlement with BP ====
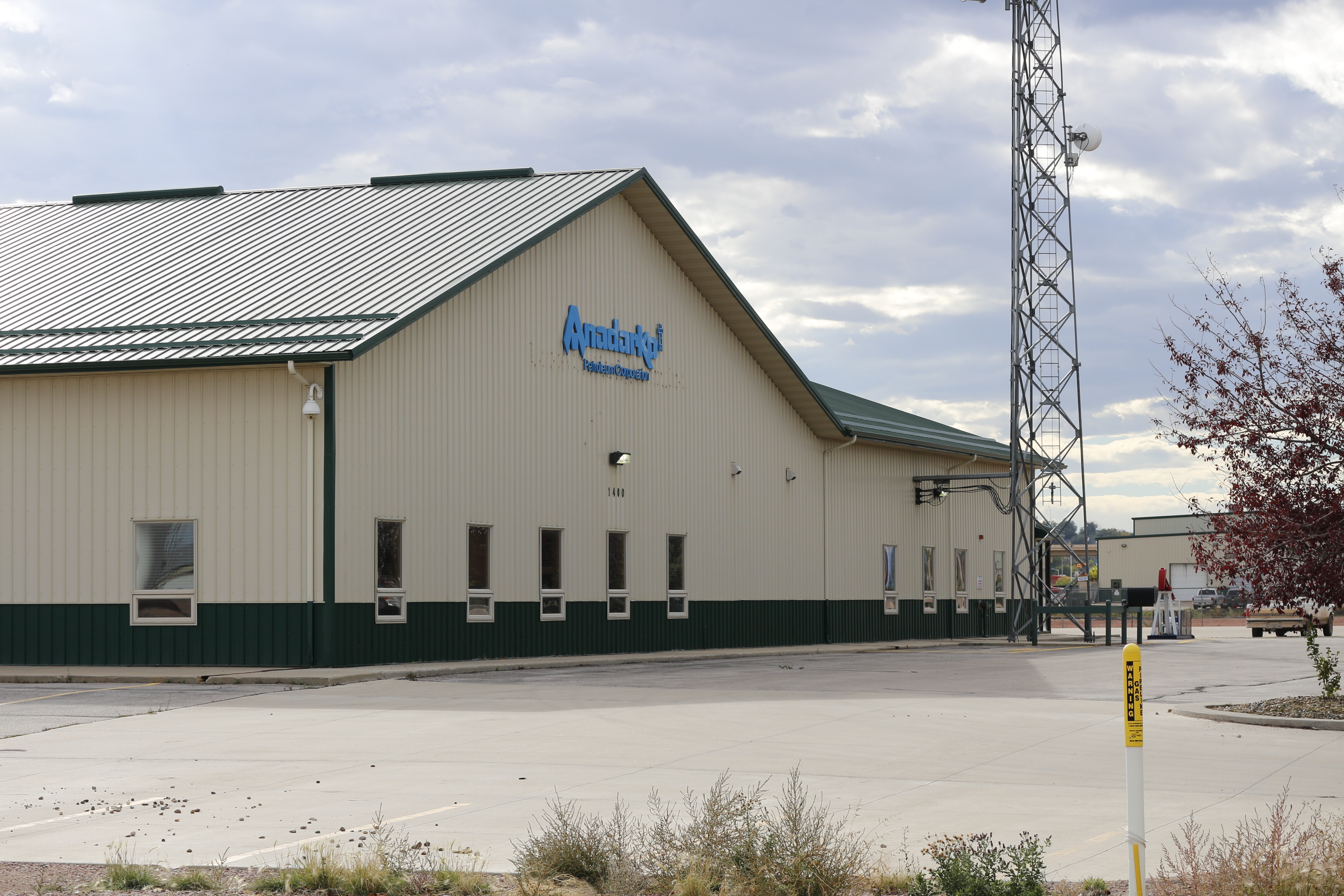
Anadarko Petroleum in Gillette, Wyoming

In early 2010, BP billed Anadarko more than $272 million as a partial payment for its share of cleanup and response costs in the Gulf.

In October 2011, Anadarko settled all claims with BP for $4 billion and its 25% stake in Mississippi Canyon Block 252 (Macondo Prospect) to BP in return for indemnification by BP for all costs related to the oil spill, including those arising under the Oil Pollution Act of 1990.

==== Fine under the Clean Water Act ====
In December 2015, U.S. District Judge Carl Barbier ordered Anadarko to pay a civil fine under the Clean Water Act of $159.5 million, or $50 per barrel of oil spilled as a result of the Deepwater Horizon explosion. The judge stated Anadarko was not at fault for the spill, but the company's 25% ownership stake made it responsible. Barbier wrote that the $159.5 million fine "strikes the appropriate balance between Anadarko's lack of culpability and the extreme seriousness of this spill." The fine came after BP and Anadarko had unsuccessfully appealed to the Supreme Court of the United States to reject Judge Carl Barbier's finding of negligence in the Deepwater Horizon accident.

=== Tronox litigation and settlements ===
In April 2014, Anadarko settled with the U.S. Department of Justice and the Environmental Protection Agency to pay $5.15 billion to clean up environmental waste sites around the country. It was the largest environmental contamination settlement in American history.

The environmental contamination sites were inherited by Anadarko after it purchased Kerr-McGee in 2005. As background, in 2006, Kerr-McGee spun off its Tronox subsidiary to offload 70 years of environmental dumping of toxic waste across 22 states beginning in the 1920s. The environmental damages included polluting Lake Mead in Nevada with rocket fuel, leaving behind radioactive waste piles throughout the territory of the Navajo Nation and dumping carcinogenic creosote in communities throughout the East, Midwest and South at its wood-treating facilities. According to one report, "Kerr-McGee, rather than pay for the environmental mess it created, decided to shift the liabilities between 2002 and 2006 into Tronox. Kerr-McGee, meanwhile, kept its oil and gas assets with Anadarko acquiring the remainder of Kerr-McGee.

==== Lawsuit from Tronox shareholders ====
In 2009, shareholders of Tronox sued Anadarko, as successor to Kerr-McGee, for having misled investors about the large environmental and other liabilities Tronox would assume from Kerr-McGee.

==== Lawsuit from the Environmental Protection Agency and Department of Justice ====
The United States Department of Justice, on behalf of the United States Environmental Protection Agency, sued Anadarko for $25 billion.

In April 2014, the parties reached a $5.15 billion settlement in what was at the time the largest environmental contamination settlement in American history. Since then the total amount for the complete and comprehensive cleanup of the BP DeepWater Horizon incident has passed $60 billion.
