= Jose Portilla =

Mexican-American football player (born 1972)

No. 76
- Position: Offensive tackle

Personal information
- Born: September 11, 1972 (age 54); Zaragoza, Mexico
- Listed height: 6 ft 6 in (1.98 m)
- Listed weight: 320 lb (145 kg)

Career information
- High school: MacArthur (East Aldine, Texas, U.S.)
- College: Arizona
- NFL draft: 1998: undrafted

Career history
- Atlanta Falcons (1998–2000); Los Angeles Xtreme (2001)

Awards and highlights
- XFL champion (2001); Second-team All-Pac-10 (1997)

Career NFL statistics
- Games played: 20
- Fumble recoveries: 1
- Stats at Pro Football Reference

Jose Casiano Portilla (born September 11, 1972) is a Mexican-American former American football offensive tackle who played two seasons with the Atlanta Falcons of the National Football League (NFL). He played college football at Ricks College and the University of Arizona. Portilla was also a member of the Los Angeles Xtreme of the XFL.

== Early life ==
Portilla was born on September 11, 1972, in Zaragoza, Mexico, and moved to the Houston, Texas, area when he was six years old. He played high school football at MacArthur High School in East Aldine, Texas and was an all-district selection.

== College career ==
Portilla first played college football for the Ricks Vikings of Ricks College. The team only lost one game in his two years there. He then served in a Mormon missionary trip from 1994 to 1995.

Portilla transferred to play for the Arizona Wildcats of the University of Arizona from 1996 to 1997. He was a two-year starter for the Wildcats, earning 1st Team Pac-10 All-Academic his senior year in 1997. He was also named to the Hula Bowl.

== Professional career ==
Portilla signed with the Atlanta Falcons in 1998 after going undrafted in the 1998 NFL draft. He played in all sixteen regular season games and three post season games, including the NFC Championship Game and Super Bowl XXXIII, during his rookie season. He played in four games for the Falcons in 1999. Portilla was released by the Falcons before the start of the 2000 season.

Portilla played for the Los Angeles Xtreme of the XFL in 2001, winning the Million Dollar Game.
