= Nimitz High School (Harris County, Texas) =

Public school in Texas, United States

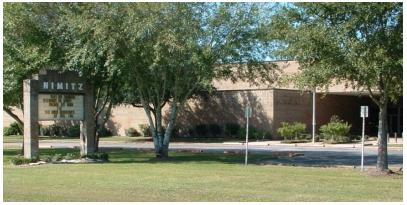

Location
- 2005 W.W. Thorne Blvd Houston, TX 77073 USA; 30.005452°N 95.388606°W

Information
- Type: Public high school
- Motto: "4 Qtrs Strong"
- Established: Fall 1978
- School district: Aldine Independent School District
- Principal: Walter Stewart
- Staff: 167.71 (FTE)
- Grades: 10–12 (A few ninth grade students also attend select classes at Nimitz High School)
- Enrollment: 2,572 (2025-2026)
- Student to teacher ratio: 16.41
- Colors: Navy Blue & Gold
- Team name: Cougars
- Publication: The Admiral
- Yearbook: The Logge
- Website: Nimitz HS; Nimitz 9th

Chester W. Nimitz Senior High School is a public secondary school made up of two campuses located in unincorporated Harris County, Texas, United States. The campuses have Houston addresses. The school is located directly across the street from Lone Star College–North Harris and west of Bush Intercontinental Airport The school serves portions of Houston, the Aldine Independent School District portion of Humble, and unincorporated areas of Harris County. Nimitz is one of five comprehensive high schools in Aldine ISD. The main campus serves 10th through 12th grade, while Nimitz Ninth Grade Center serves 9th grade.

== History ==
Nimitz first opened its doors in the fall of 1978, relieving both Aldine and MacArthur High School. Located near the border of Houston, Spring, and Humble, it was and still is the only high school located in the far northeast region of the Aldine School District. The campus was relieved of its ninth graders with the opening of its freshmen campus in the fall of 1999. Nimitz gained 215 young victims resulting from Hurricane Katrina after the hurricane struck New Orleans, Louisiana, and nearby coastal areas in Louisiana, Mississippi, and Alabama in 2005, and is notable for causing strife between the two differing groups of students, especially soon after the hurricane.

== Academics ==
For the 2018-2019 school year, the school received a B grade from the Texas Education Agency, with an overall score of 80 out of 100. The school received a C grade in two domains, Student Achievement (score of 76) and Closing the Gaps (score of 71), and a B grade in School Progress (score of 84). The school received one of the seven possible distinction designations for Post-secondary Readiness.

== Demographics ==
The student demographics at Nimitz High School for the 2025-2026 school year is:

- Hispanic: 54.02%
- Black: 40.05%
- White: 2.54%
- Two or More Races: 1.45%
- Asian: 0.83%
- Native Hawaiian or other Pacific Islander: 0.75%
- Native American: 0.44%

82.3% of students are Economically Disadvantaged.

== Advanced placement and honor courses provided at NHS ==
- Biology
- Calculus AB
- Calculus BC
- Chemistry
- Economics: Micro
- English Language & Composition
- English Literature & Composition
- Government & Politics: U.S.
- Humanities
- Spanish Language
- Statistics
- U.S. History

== Neighborhoods served ==
While the school has a Houston address, it serves students in portions of unincorporated Harris County, Bordersville, the AISD portion of Humble (including communities such as Inverness Forest, Woodcreek, Memorial Hills, Kenswick, Foxwood, and Deerbrook Estates), and a small portion of East Aldine (areas north of Aldine Bender).

Nimitz serves a Houston Housing Authority (HHA) public housing complex, Mansions at Turkey Creek.

Due to the tremendous growth in the areas serving AISD, the district opened Benjamin O. Davis High School in the Fall of 2012. Davis was built to help alleviate overcrowding at the district's four high schools. The school took in freshmen and sophomore students its first year, phasing in juniors and seniors in the following years. Communities in the Greenspoint area of the Nimitz attendance zone were directly affected by the school's opening.

== Notable alumni ==
- Michael Bourn (2000) (MLB)
- Aaron Glenn (1990) (NFL)
- Jason Glenn (1997) (NFL)
- Marion Grice (2010) (NFL)
- Quentin Griffin (1999) (NFL)
- Brittney Griner (2009) (WNBA) (Olympic champion)
- Dante Hall (1996) (NFL)
- Josh Huff (2010) (NFL)
- Janae Jefferson (2017) (WPF)
- Mike Jones (Rapper)
- Cartier Martin (2003) (NBA)
- Darrell Stewart Jr. (2015) (NFL)
- Michael Thomas (2008) (NFL)
- Darrick Vaughn (1996) (NFL)

== Feeder pattern ==
Jones Middle School	Teague Middle School	Aldine Middle School	Lewis Middle School
Cypresswood Elementary	Calvert Elementary	Calvert Elementary	Dunn Elementary
Francis Elementary	Dunn Elementary	Eckert Elementary	
Jones Elementary	Ogden Elementary	Francis Elementary	
		Johnson Elementary	

== Extracurricular activities ==
Academic & Interest Groups
Academic Decathlon
Anime Club
Black History Club
Book Club
Cougars Care
Determined Intelligent Vivacious Achievers (DIVAs)
Generation Y
History Fair
National Honor Society (NHS)
National Art Honor Society (NAHS)
Speech and Debate
Technology Students Association (TSA)
Yearbook

Athletics
Baseball
Boys' Basketball
Boys' Cross Country
Boys' Soccer
Boys' Track
Cheerleading
Dominoes
Football
Girls' Basketball
Girls' Cross Country
Girls' Soccer
Girls' Track
Golf
Softball
Athletic Trainers
Swimming
Tennis
Volleyball

Career
Criminal Justice Club
Business Professionals of America (BPA)
Future Business Leaders of America (FBLA)
Future Farmers of America (FFA)
Health Occupation Students of America (HOSA)
Texas Association of Future Educators (TAFE)

Drill Team
Starboard Angels

Government
Student Council

Music
Nimitz Choir
Roaring Cougar Band (RCB) & Color Guard

ROTC
Navy Junior Reserve Officers Training Corps (NJROTC)

Step Teams
Gamma Psi Mu (RYM-Respectable Young Men)
Ladies of Elegance (LOE)

University Interscholastic League
UIL Art
UIL Band
UIL Choir
UIL Computer Applications
UIL Drama
UIL Marching Band
UIL Science
UIL Spelling
