= Tony Hutson =

American football player (1974–2024)

No. 66, 68
- Position: Guard

Personal information
- Born: March 13, 1974; Little Rock, AR, U.S.
- Died: February 3, 2024 (aged 49)
- Listed height: 6 ft 3 in (1.91 m)
- Listed weight: 315 lb (143 kg)

Career information
- High school: MacArthur (Houston)
- College: Kilgore College (1992–93); Northeastern State
- NFL draft: 1996: undrafted

Career history
- Dallas Cowboys (1996–1999); Washington Redskins (2000); Oakland Raiders (2001)*
- * Offseason or practice squad member only

Awards and highlights
- 2× All-OIC (1994, 1995); 2× NAIA All-American (1994, 1995)

Career NFL statistics
- Games played: 20
- Stats at Pro Football Reference

Tony Hutson (March 13, 1974 – February 3, 2024) was an American professional football player who was a guard in the National Football League for the Dallas Cowboys and Washington Redskins. He played college football at Kilgore College (1992–93) and Northeastern Oklahoma State University.

== Early life ==
Hutson attended MacArthur High School, where he played as an offensive tackle, receiving All-state, All-Greater Houston and All-district honors as a senior. He moved on to Kilgore College, where he was a two-time All-conference selection.

Hutson transferred to Northeastern Oklahoma State University, where he received NAIA All-American honors while playing as an offensive tackle.

In 1999, he was voted as part of the state of Oklahoma college football All-Century team.

== Professional career ==
=== Dallas Cowboys ===
Hutson was signed as an undrafted free agent by the Dallas Cowboys after the 1996 NFL draft. He was dropped because of a benign tumor that was found in his right lung, that could have potentially shortened his career. As a rookie, he was converted into an offensive guard. He was waived on August 26 and later signed to the practice squad. On January 5, 1997, he was promoted to the active roster for the Divisional playoff game against the Carolina Panthers, although he was declared inactive.

In 1997, he suffered a ligament injury in his right wrist during offseason workouts, that limited him to only playing in the final two preseason games. On August 24, he was released and signed to the practice squad two days later. On November 4, he was promoted to the active roster for the last five games of the season.

In 1998, he was deactivated for the first five games of the season. He was also used as a second tight end on short yardage situations.

In 1999, he was limited by a sprained medial collateral ligament in his right knee. He returned to practice on August 18 and played only in the final two preseason games. He got a chance to start two games at right tackle in place of an injured Erik Williams. He suffered a torn right anterior cruciate ligament in the third game against the Arizona Cardinals and was placed on the injured reserve list on October 5.

On August 27, 2000, he was cut after being passed on the depth chart by undrafted free agent Alcender Jackson.

=== Washington Redskins ===
On October 9, 2000, he was signed as a free agent with the Washington Redskins, who were looking to replace an injured Tre' Johnson. He wasn't re-signed at the end of the season.

=== Oakland Raiders ===
In 2001, he was signed by the Oakland Raiders as a free agent. He was released before the start of the season, after he struggled with a triceps injury.

== Death ==
Hutson died on February 3, 2024, at the age of 49.
