= Marion Grice =

American football player (born 1991)

No. 23
- Position: Running back

Personal information
- Born: April 10, 1991 (age 35); Houston, Texas, U.S.
- Listed height: 6 ft 0 in (1.83 m)
- Listed weight: 213 lb (97 kg)

Career information
- High school: Nimitz (Houston)
- College: Blinn (2010–2011); Arizona State (2012–2013)
- NFL draft: 2014: 6th round, 201st overall pick

Career history
- San Diego Chargers (2014)*; Arizona Cardinals (2014−2015); Detroit Lions (2015)*; Arizona Cardinals (2015)*; Ottawa Redblacks (2017)*; Edmonton Eskimos (2017)*
- * Offseason or practice squad member only

Awards and highlights
- Second-team All-Pac-12 (2013); Second-team NJCAA All-American (2011)

Career NFL statistics
- Rushing attempts: 15
- Rushing yards: 41
- Rushing touchdowns: 1
- Stats at Pro Football Reference
- Stats at CFL.ca

Marion Grice (born April 10, 1991) is an American former professional football player who was a running back for the Arizona Cardinals of the National Football League (NFL). He was selected by the San Diego Chargers in the sixth round of the 2014 NFL draft. He played college football for the Arizona State Sun Devils.

== Early life ==
Grice attended Nimitz High School (Harris County, Texas) in Houston, Texas, where he played running back alongside fellow NFL player Josh Huff who was the team's quarterback. He graduated in 2010.

== College career ==
Grice attended Blinn Community College for two years. He totaled 2,221 rushing yards and 33 touchdowns over two junior college seasons at Blinn, and was named as a Second-team NJCAA All-American as a sophomore in 2011 after carrying 174 times for 1,052 yards with 16 rushing touchdowns. Rated as a four-star recruit by Rivals.com, he was listed as the No. 5 overall junior college prospect in the country.

He committed to Arizona State University on February 1, 2012.

Grice compiled a total of 39 total touchdowns, fifth in school history, despite playing in only 24 games. In 2012, while working his way as the starter, he led the team in rushing yards with 679 yards on 103 rushes (6.6 yards per carry average) and had 11 touchdowns. He also added 41 receptions for 425 yards and eight touchdowns. He finished his season recording 159 yards on 14 rushes and two touchdowns, being named Most Valuable Player of the 2012 Kraft Fight Hunger Bowl. In 2013, he rushed for 996 yards on 191 rushes (5.2 yards per carry) and 14 touchdowns, and caught 50 passes for 438 yards and six touchdowns, missing the last three games of the season. Grice finished third in the country in all purpose yards per game (176.45) and fifth in the country in scoring per game (10.9). He earned second-team All-Pac-12 Conference honors.

== Professional career ==
Grice was selected by the San Diego Chargers with the 201st overall pick in the sixth round of the 2014 NFL draft. He was released on September 1, 2014, but was signed to their practice squad on September 2, 2014.

On September 22, 2014, the Arizona Cardinals signed Grice off the Chargers' practice squad. Grice played in his first regular season NFL game October 26, 2014, against the Philadelphia Eagles. He recorded his first touchdown, a one-yard rush in the fourth quarter of the Cardinals win over the Dallas Cowboys on November 2. He scored a touchdown run in the Cardinals' game in the playoffs on January 3, 2015, against the Carolina Panthers. On September 5, 2015, he was waived/injured by the Cardinals. On the following day, he cleared waivers and was reverted to the Cardinals' injured reserve list. On September 8, 2015, Grice was released by the Cardinals with an injury settlement.

On October 20, 2015, the Detroit Lions signed Grice to their practice squad. On November 10, 2015, the Lions released Grice from the practice squad.

On December 24, 2015, the Cardinals signed Grice to their practice squad. On January 26, 2016, Grice signed a futures contract with the Cardinals.

Grice signed with the Ottawa Redblacks of the Canadian Football League (CFL) in November 2016, following the conclusion of the 2016 CFL season. He was released by the Redblacks on May 28, 2017 at the start of training camp.

Grice signed with the CFL's Edmonton Eskimos on June 4, 2017. He was released by the Eskimos on June 18. He was signed to the Eskimos' practice squad on August 1, 2017. He was released on May 1, 2018.

In 2022, Grice was selected by the Mobile team of the American Patriot League (APL), scheduled to begin play in 2023.
