= 2012 Kraft Fight Hunger Bowl =

Navy Midshipmen	Arizona State Sun Devils
(8–4)	(7–5)
Independent	Pac-12
28	62
Head coach: Ken Niumatalolo	Head coach: Todd Graham
	1	2	3	4	Total
Navy	0	7	7	14	28
Arizona State	21	13	28	0	62
- Date: December 29, 2012
- Season: 2012
- Stadium: AT&T Park
- Location: San Francisco, California
- MVP: Marion Grice (Offense); Will Sutton (Defense)
- Favorite: Arizona State by 14 1/2
- National anthem: Glide Memorial Church Ensemble
- Referee: Rick Loumiet (Big 12)
- Halftime show: Arizona State University Sun Devil Marching Band
- Attendance: 34,172
- Payout: US$750,000 (Navy) $950,000 (Pac-12)

United States TV coverage
- Network: ESPN2
- Announcers: Dave Pasch (Play-by-play); Brian Griese (Color commentary); Jenn Brown (Sidelines)
- Nielsen ratings: 0.7

The 2012 Kraft Fight Hunger Bowl was a postseason American college football bowl game held on December 29, 2012, at AT&T Park in San Francisco, California, United States. The 11th edition of the Kraft Fight Hunger Bowl began at 1:00 p.m. PST, and was televised on ESPN2. It featured the Arizona State Sun Devils of the Pac-12 Conference (Pac-12) and the Navy Midshipmen, who were conference independent. It was the final game of the 2012 NCAA Division I FBS football season for both teams. The game, won by the Sun Devils 62–28, drew 34,172 spectators.

In accordance with a 2009 deal with bowl organizers, the Midshipmen accepted their invitation to play in the game on November 3 after winning six of their first nine games of the season. After the Sun Devils achieved bowl eligibility by defeating in-state rival Arizona Wildcats for a 7–5 regular-season record, the team accepted its bowl invitation on December 2.

The pregame buildup focused on the contest between Navy's triple option offense and the Sun Devils' defense. After a change in quarterbacks, the Midshipmen's rushing offense had become one of the best in the nation; however, the team's passing offense ranked near the bottom of the Football Bowl Subdivision (FBS). Arizona State's balanced offense hinged on its quarterback efficiency, with the potential to set a number of school records for the season. Defensively the team ranked as one of the best in the nation in sacks and tackles for loss, but its rushing defense ranked 74th in yards allowed per game. Most analysts predicted a victory for the Sun Devils. Navy sold over 10,000 tickets to the game, and Arizona State sold over 5,000.

The Sun Devils scored the first 21 points of the game in the first quarter, while keeping the Midshipmen scoreless. After Navy scored its first points in the second quarter, Arizona State scored two more touchdowns to bring the score to 34–7 at halftime. The Sun Devils added four more touchdowns in the third quarter, but the only additional points from the Midshipmen came from a 95-yard kickoff return for a touchdown. Navy scored the only two touchdowns of the fourth quarter, ending the game with a score of 62–28. The bowl brought both teams' won–lost records to 8–5.

== Team selection ==
In September 2009 organizers of the Emerald Bowl (renamed the Kraft Fight Hunger Bowl, reflecting its new sponsor) announced that they had renewed their contract with the Pac-12 Conference for four years, with the sixth bowl-eligible team in the conference playing against a team from the Western Athletic Conference in the 2010 and 2013 editions of the game and the Navy Midshipmen in the 2012 game (assuming that Navy was bowl-eligible). Before the 2012 season college-football analyst Phil Steele projected that Navy would play the California Golden Bears, but changed his projected Pac-12 team in late October to the Sun Devils. On November 3, CBSSports.com writer Jerry Palm projected that Navy would play the Arizona Wildcats in the game, but after the USC Trojans lost to the UCLA Bruins on November 17, both Palm and ESPN.com analyst Kevin Gemmell projected that the Trojans would play in the Fight Hunger Bowl. Navy received $750,000 for its participation, and Arizona State received $950,000. The game's executive director, Gary Cavalli, received $375,176 in compensation. The game was the 18th bowl appearance for the Midshipmen and the 26th for the Sun Devils; it was the first ever meeting between the teams.

=== Navy ===
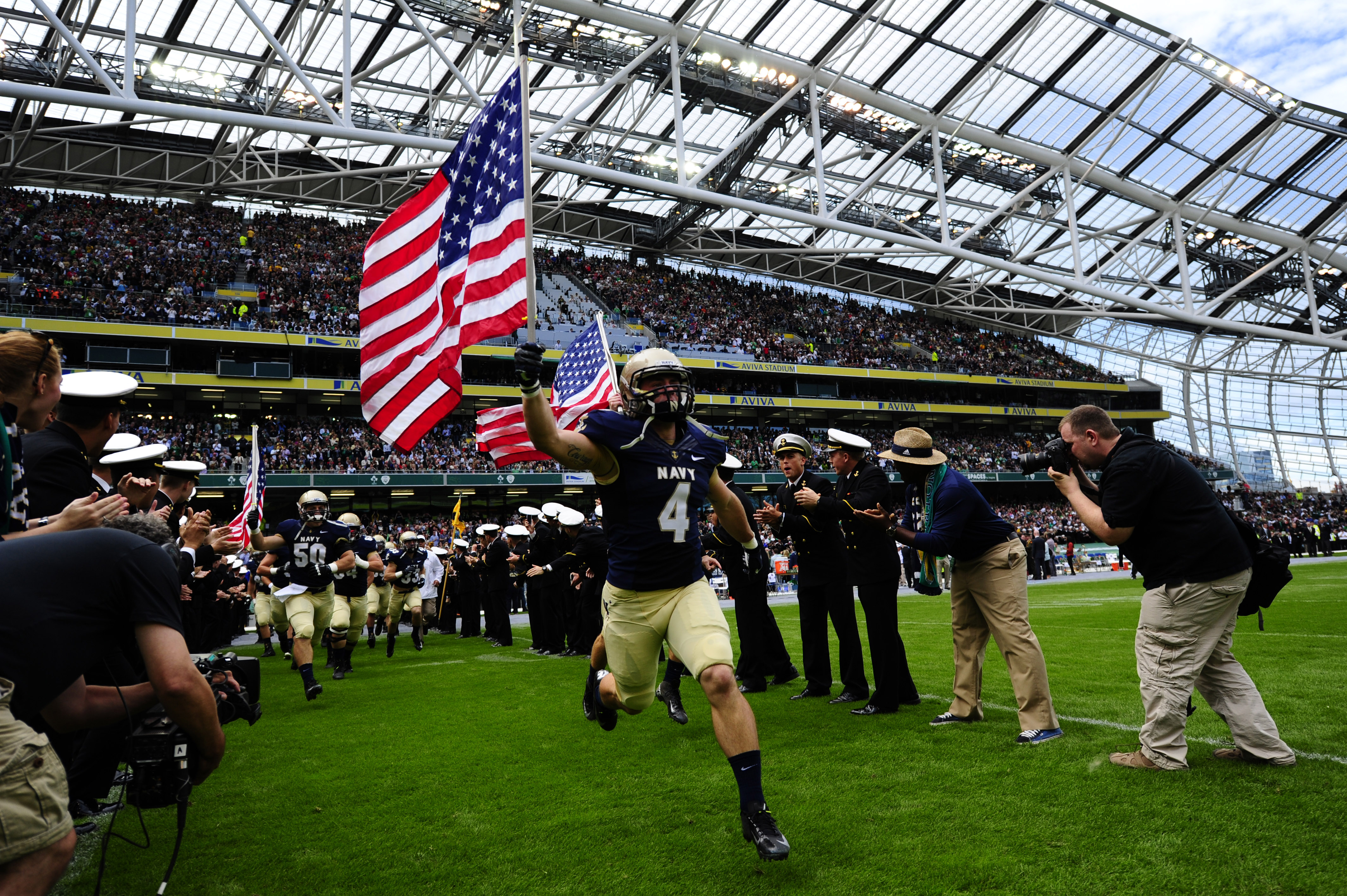
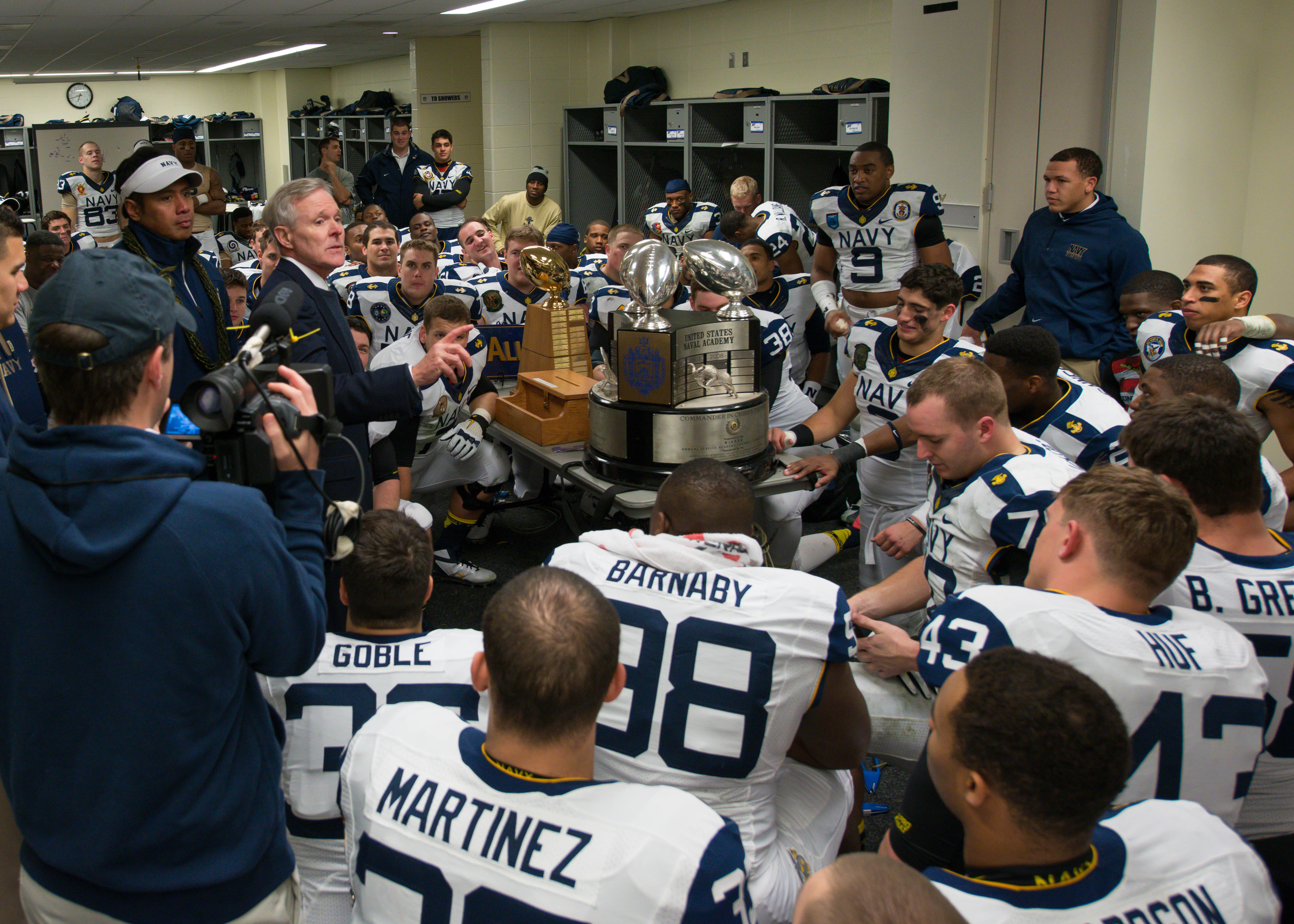
The Midshipmen regular season began with a loss at the Emerald Isle Classic (left) and ended with the Army–Navy Game, winning the Commander-in-Chief's Trophy (right).

The Navy Midshipmen, representing the United States Naval Academy, began their 2012 season with a 50–10 loss to the Notre Dame Fighting Irish at the Emerald Isle Classic in Dublin, Ireland. They accumulated a 1–3 record for their first four games, but began a five-game winning streak with a victory over the Air Force Falcons in overtime on October 6. On November 3, after defeating the Florida Atlantic Owls to raise their season record to 6–3, the Midshipmen accepted the first invitation of the 2012–13 NCAA bowl season to play in the Kraft Fight Hunger Bowl. Navy athletic director Chet Gladchuk cited the team's positive experiences at the 2004 Emerald Bowl as a primary reason for returning to play in the game. The Midshipmen won that game, against the New Mexico Lobos, by a score of 34–19; it was highlighted by a drive from the Midshipmen in the third and fourth quarters which set an NCAA record for the longest drive in a college-football game.

During the rest of the season the Midshipmen lost to the Troy Trojans and defeated the Texas State Bobcats before playing the final game of the regular season, the 113th Army–Navy Game. After the Sun Devils accepted their invitation, Navy head coach Ken Niumatalolo stressed that his team still considered the game against the Army Black Knights for the Commander-in-Chief's Trophy more pressing than preparations for the bowl:

We have played a very tough schedule this year and there is no doubt that Arizona State will be as talented as any team we've faced. However, right now our only focus is on Saturday's game against Army. It's the biggest game of the year and this year it has added significance with the Commander-In-Chief's Trophy on the line. We will worry about Arizona State after the Army game.

— Navy head coach Ken Niumatalolo

The Midshipmen won 17–13, their 11th consecutive victory in that series. The 2012 Kraft Fight Hunger Bowl was the first postseason game for the Midshipmen since their loss in the 2010 Poinsettia Bowl to the San Diego State Aztecs; Navy had lost four of its last five postseason games.

=== Arizona State ===
The Sun Devils, representing Arizona State University (ASU), began their first season under head coach Todd Graham by winning four of their first five games; their lone defeat was a 20–24 loss to the Missouri Tigers. They lost to their next four Pac-12 Conference opponents, giving them a 5–5 record in the first 10 games of the season. With two games left the team needed at least one more win for bowl eligibility, and defeated the Washington State Cougars on November 17. On November 23 it defeated the 24th-ranked Arizona Wildcats in its final regular-season game to win the Territorial Cup, finishing the season at 7–5 (its best record since the 2007 season). After the game, bowl organizers announced that one of the two Arizona teams would receive the second invitation to play in the Kraft Fight Hunger Bowl, with the other team probably going to the 2012 New Mexico Bowl. Both schools lobbied heavily for an invitation to the Kraft bowl, with ASU officials saying that the date of the New Mexico Bowl conflicted with the school's final examination schedule. The Sun Devils accepted their invitation on December 2. It was the second straight bowl game for ASU; the Sun Devils lost the 2011 Maaco Bowl Las Vegas against the Boise State Broncos the previous year.

== Pre-game buildup ==
Both teams were allotted 15 extra practices to prepare for the bowl game, and expected to use the game to increase their recruiting presence in the San Francisco Bay Area. After their final regular-season game against Arizona, the Sun Devils had 37 days to prepare for the bowl. Arizona State coach Todd Graham, who attracted criticism in early December when he ranked his team 20th in the nation in the coaches' poll, used part of his extended practice schedule to prepare younger players for the upcoming season. After it defeated Army, the Midshipmen had 21 days to prepare for the bowl game; however, due to the demanding final-examination schedule at the United States Naval Academy and the unusual length of Navy's football season, head coach Ken Niumatalolo gave his team extra recovery time after the Army–Navy game. The team had one-hour practices at 6 a.m. to avoid conflicting with the school's examination schedule. Before the team's game against Army, Vice Admiral Michael H. Miller reinstated linebacker Brye French and slotback Bo Snelson (who had been removed as a team captain before the Emerald Isle Classic). During pregame walk-throughs the team prepared its new play calling system, which consisted of a number of oversized cards divided into four sections with a variety of colors and symbols. Members of both teams participated in community-service activities in the days before the game; the Midshipmen and Sun Devils served meals at St. Anthony's Dining Room and Glide Memorial Church, respectively, on Christmas Day.

=== Offensive matchups ===
==== Navy offense ====
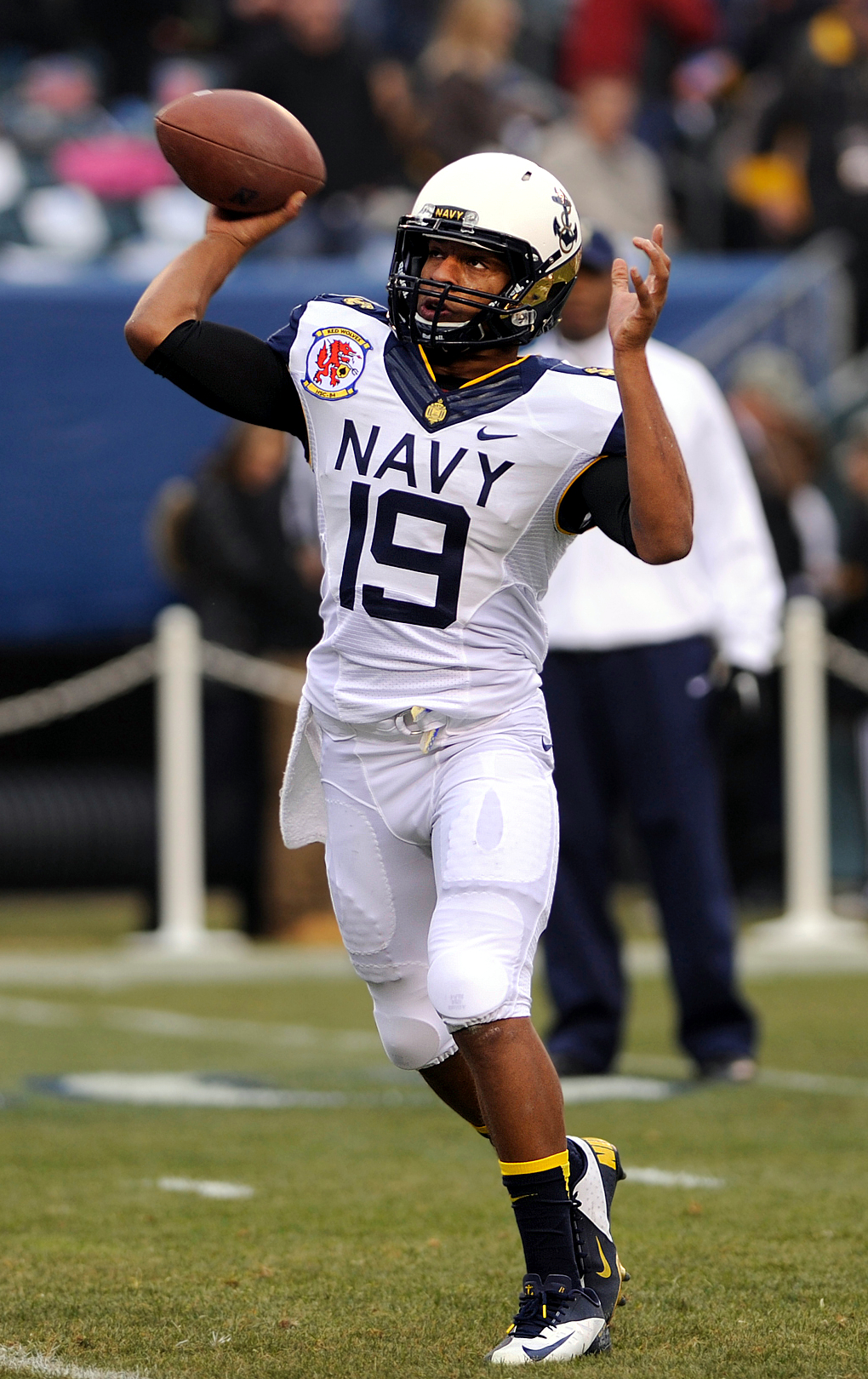
Midshipmen quarterback Keenan Reynolds throws a pass during the 113th Army–Navy Game.

Although the Midshipmen scored 10 or fewer points in three of their first four games, they averaged almost 32 points per game in their seven games before facing Army. The team's offense focused on its flexbone-style triple option offensive scheme, ranked sixth in the nation in rushing yards per game. Senior slotback Gee Gee Greene led the team in rushing yards with 765. Greene (who had played in every Midshipmen game since 2009) had earned 1,996 career rushing yards before the Army game, second among Navy slotbacks behind Shun White. Sophomore fullback Noah Copeland ran for 694 yards during the season.

Typical of triple-option teams, the Midshipmen rarely threw the ball (attempting 143 passes in their first eleven games). Keenan Reynolds, the third freshman to start at quarterback in the team's history, started every game after the team's win against the Air Force Falcons (rushing for 628 yards on 140 carries during the season). In the win over Army, Reynolds completed 10 of 17 passes for 130 yards and received the game's Most Valuable Player award. With 758 career receiving yards, Gee Gee Greene needed 73 more in the bowl to pass Reggie Campbell's record for most receiving yards by a Navy slotback.

==== Arizona State offense ====
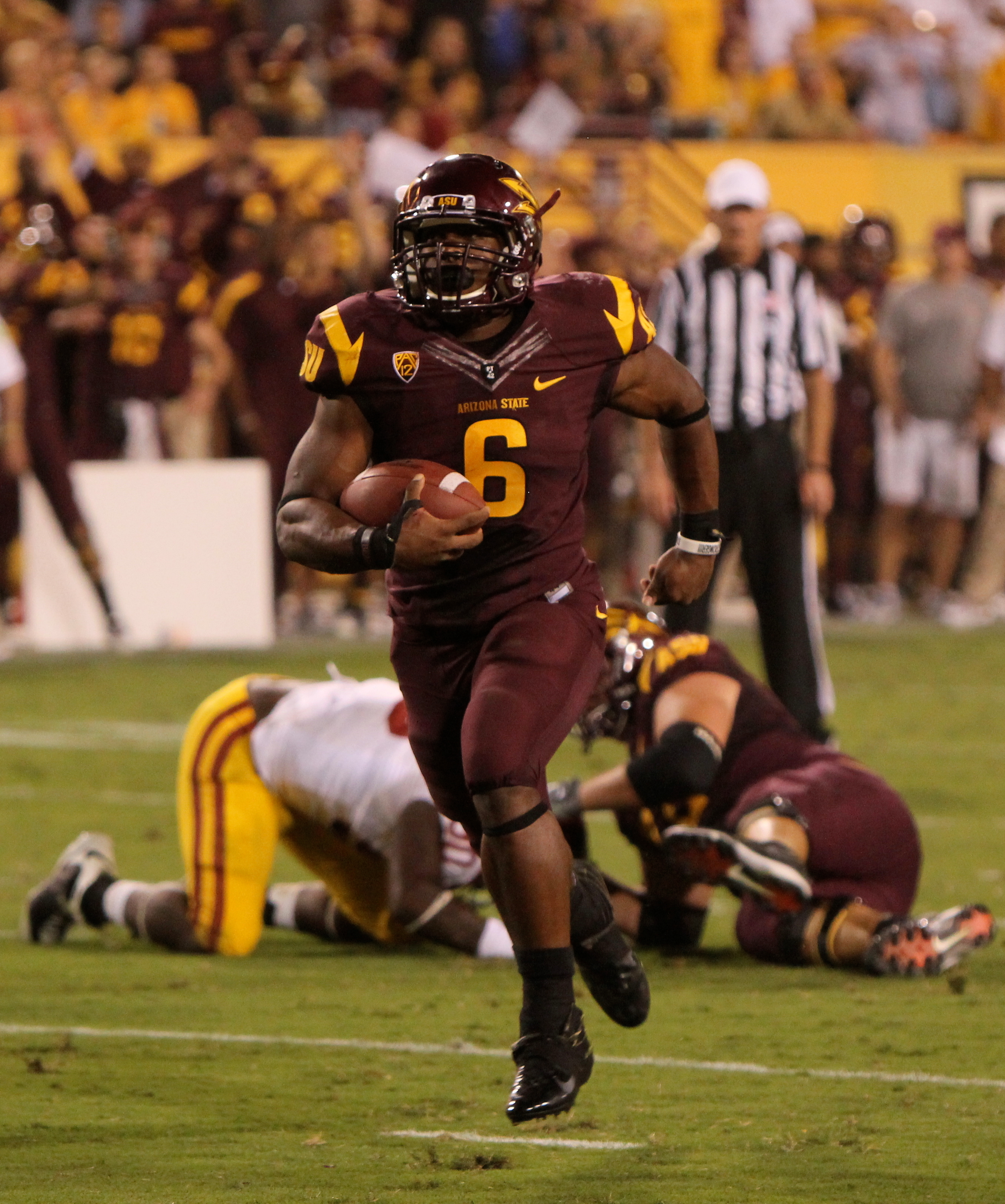
ASU Running back Cameron Marshall tied a school record for rushing touchdowns in a season in 2011.

Using a balanced spread offense system, the Sun Devils came into the game with the third-best scoring offense in the Pac-12 Conference. Sophomore quarterback Taylor Kelly led the team with 2,772 passing yards and 25 touchdowns. He also threw nine interceptions, seven of these during the Sun Devils' four-game losing streak. The team's receiving corps included six players with at least 300vyards for the season. Senior running back Cameron Marshall led the team in rushing yards with 524, but his role in the team's offense had decreased since the previous season. Junior running back Marion Grice ran for 520 yards during the season, receiving 406. Grice's status for the game was in doubt when he took leave from the team after his brother's death, but it was later announced that he expected to play in the game.

Several Sun Devils had opportunities to set school records. Kelly entered the game with a season 65.9-percent pass-completion rate, and was likely to break the school record held by Brock Osweiler set during the 2011 season. He was also likely to break Rudy Carpenter's single-season passing efficiency record set during the 2007 season. Tight end Chris Coyle was likely to tie (or break) school records for receptions and touchdowns by a tight end in a season, both held by Zach Miller. Punter Josh Hubner also had an opportunity to break the single-season record for average yards per punt.

=== Defensive matchups ===
==== Navy defense ====
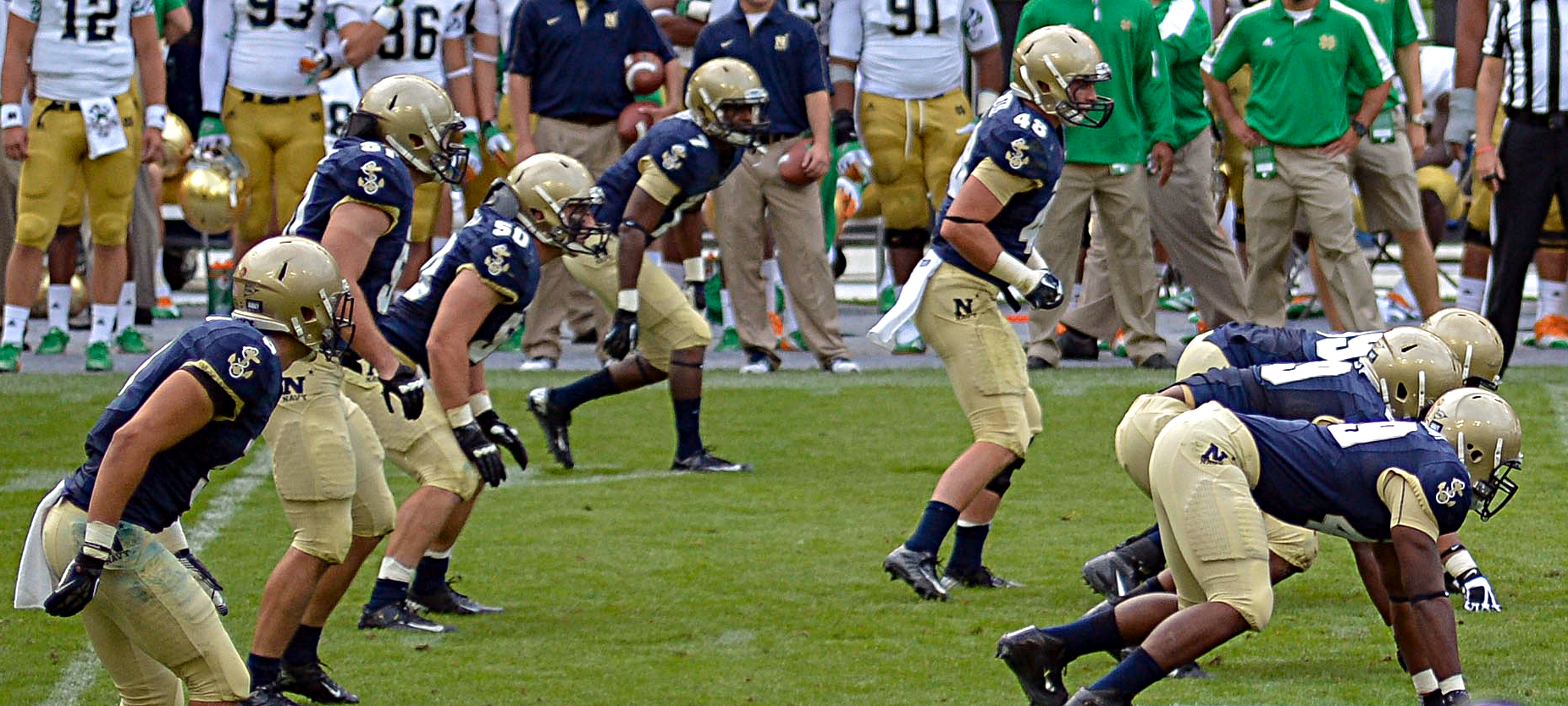
Navy lines up its 3–4 defense: three down lineman and four linebackers. One defensive back is also visible.

The Midshipmen came into the game ranking 55th in yards allowed per game and 31st in scoring defense, allowing opponents to score an average of 22 points per game. The team ranked 94th and 102nd in the nation in sacks and tackles for losses, respectively. Immediately after returning from the Army–Navy Game, 11th-year Midshipmen defensive coordinator Buddy Green began preparing his team's 3–4 defensive scheme for the Sun Devils' offense. Although the Midshipmen had faced similar spread offenses earlier in the season, Green noted the Sun Devils' balance between running and passing plays: "They do some things that are similar to a lot of the teams we play, but I don't think there has been one opponent that incorporates all the elements that [Arizona State] has in its package."

Linebacker Keegan Wetzel led the team in tackles. Although the team's defensive secondary unit was plagued with injuries early in the season, the squad found some stability by its final regular-season game. After the team's win against the Texas State Bobcats, cornerback Kwazel Bertrand was named the FBS Independent Defensive Player of Week. After an early-season series of personal issues and injuries depleted the Midshipmen defensive line, Navy had established a rotating system of 11 linemen to keep players fresh during games. The Midshipmen also used unconventional position moves to adapt to opponents: before the bowl game, Greene moved defensive end Danny Ring to nose tackle to better handle opponents' running backs.

==== Arizona State defense ====
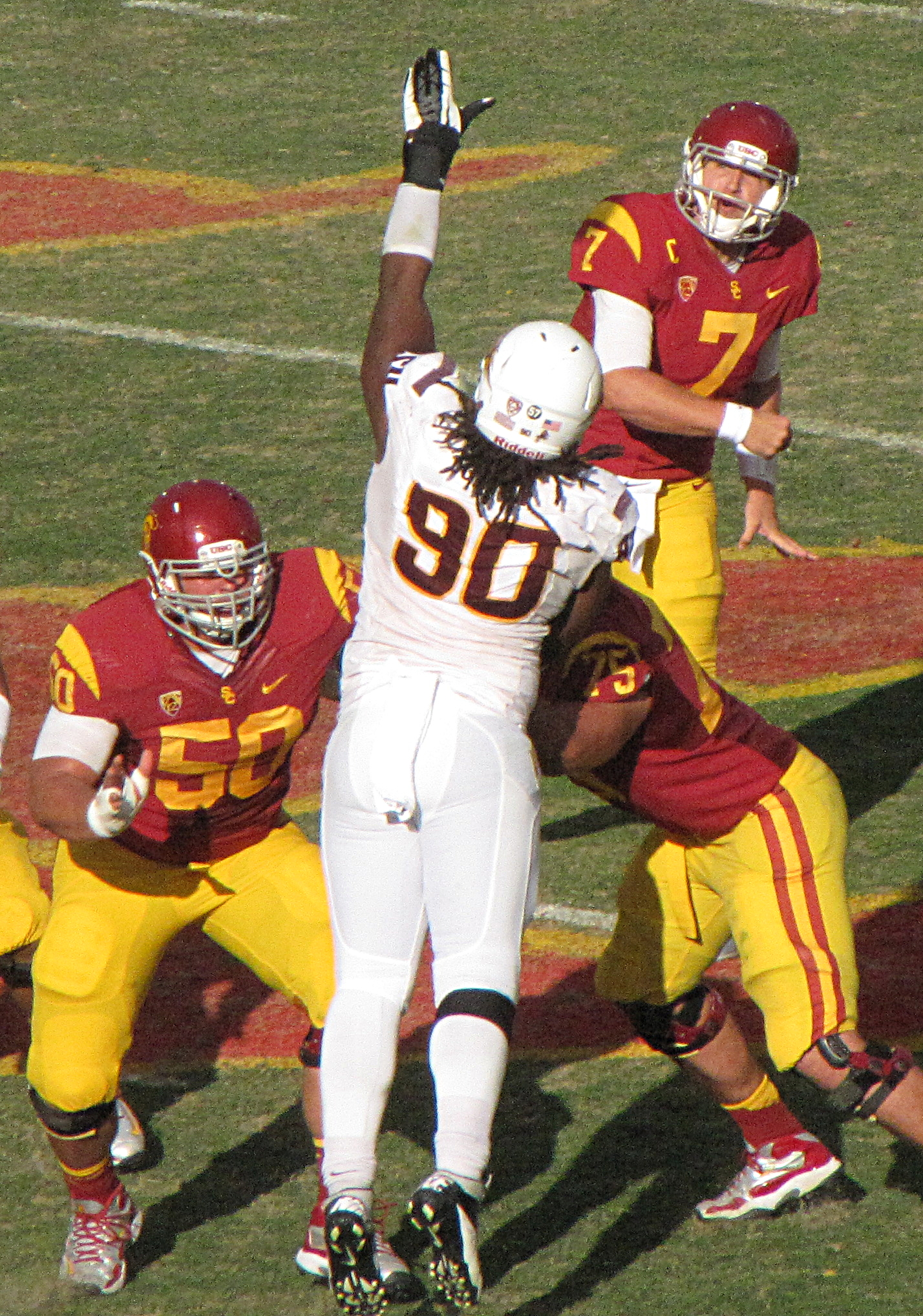
All-American defensive tackle Will Sutton reaches to block a pass.

The Sun Devils' defense ranked 26th in the nation in total defense, second in tackles for loss and second in sacks; however, it ranked 74th in rushing defense (allowing opponents to gain an average of 172 yards per game on the ground). The team's defensive squad was led by players like Keelan Johnson (11th in the nation for interceptions), Carl Bradford (16th in the nation for tackles for loss and 17th for sacks), Brandon Magee (third in the nation for solo tackles) and defensive tackle Will Sutton (fifth in the nation in tackles for loss, and thirteenth in sacks). Sutton, who forced three fumbles and broke up five passes, was voted the Pat Tillman Defensive Player of the Year in the Pac-12 Conference and was named as a consensus All-American player. Before the game, Sutton told reporters he was uncertain if he would forgo his senior season and enter the 2013 NFL draft after the game.

Pregame media attention focused on the ability of Arizona State's defense to stop Navy's triple-option offense. ESPN.com analyst Kevin Gemmell wrote, "Watching Sutton... and the rest of the Sun Devils defense square off with the Navy offense is going to be one of the more fascinating chess matches of the postseason". Terese Karmel wrote for SportsPageMagazine.com, "The key to the game could be the match-up between the Sun Devils' defense (second in the nation in sacks with 48) against the Naval Academy's young quarterback, Keenan Reynolds". After the Sun Devils accepted the invitation, head coach Todd Graham began to prepare the team to face Navy's run-heavy offense. Graham spoke about preparing defensively for Navy's triple-option offense:

Obviously it's completely different and defensively it's tough. You can't underestimate their abilities. We've been working on it for a couple of days and it will take us a while, but it's hard to simulate it in any way, and much more difficult this week. I've spent a lot of time defending that type of offense, so I think we have a pretty god idea of how to do it. It's still not very easy because of the blocking and how they go about it, it's a very difficult scheme to defend. We're preparing for it – it's not easy, but we'll get it done.

— Sun Devils head coach Todd Graham

Defensive coordinator Paul Randolph said the team would not focus solely on stopping the run, citing Reynolds' recent passing performance as reasons for emphasizing discipline in the team's defensive secondary.

=== Predictions ===
Most sports analysts predicted that Arizona State to win the game. All six college-football commentators surveyed by CBSSports.com predicted an Arizona State victory; of eight analysts surveyed by River Region Sports, six predicted that the Sun Devils would win the game and two favored the Midshipmen. Basing his prediction on the Sun Devils' balanced offensive scheme, NBC Sports writer John Tamanaha predicted that Arizona State would defeat Navy 42–23. The Sporting News predicted that if Arizona State could avoid turnovers, they would win the game. Analyst Will Harris predicted a 42–24 victory for the Sun Devils on ESPN.com, citing Todd Graham's bowl record and Navy's undersized defense as reasons for his confident projection. Phil Steele and Sports Illustrated writer Stewart Mandel also predicted that Arizona State would win, rating the game among their most-confident predictions. Spread bettors favored the Sun Devils by 14 1/2 points.

=== Ticket sales ===
Each team was required to purchase a minimum of 11,500 tickets for the game. Navy's athletics department began selling tickets priced from $25 to $75 in November. The Arizona State athletics department began selling tickets in December for $50 to $85. As of December 4, tickets were selling on the resale ticket market for an average of $99. Both schools campaigned to increase fan turnout at the game. Arizona State sold $75 travel packages to students, which included a game ticket, bus transportation and hotel accommodations. Navy allowed donors to purchase tickets to the game for active military personnel and veterans. On December 17, bowl director Gary Cavalli said that Navy had sold over 10,000 tickets. Although Arizona State aimed to sell another 10,000, the school sold about 5,000 by December 19. Cavalli estimated that the game would sell a total of about 35,000 tickets. For every ticket sold, bowl sponsors donated a meal to the San Francisco Food Bank, the St. Anthony Foundation, and the Glide Foundation.

== Game summary ==
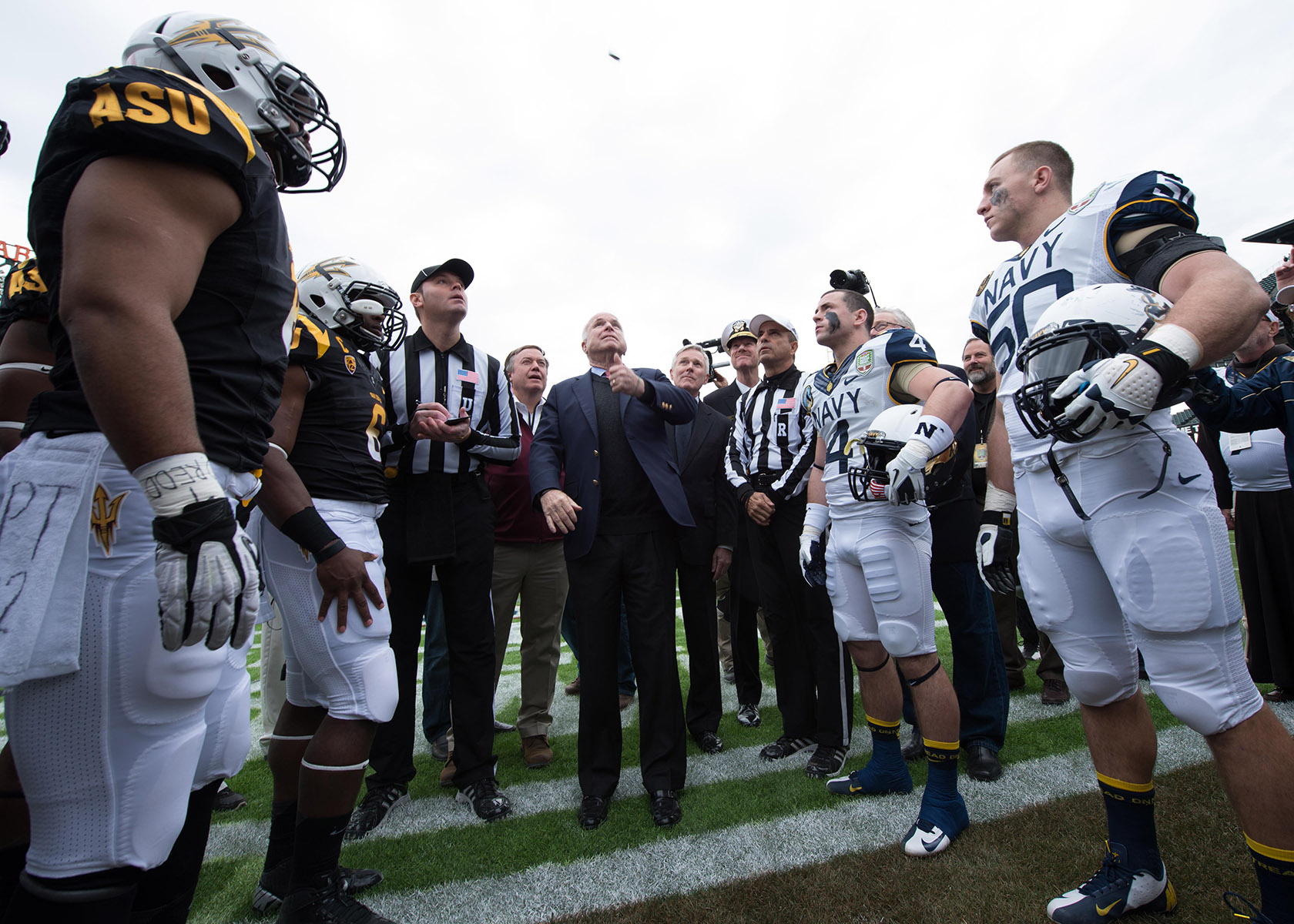
Arizona Senator John McCain tosses an Oreo as part of the pregame coin-toss ceremony.

The 2012 Kraft Fight Hunger Bowl began at 1:00 p.m. PST on December 29, 2012, at AT&T Park in San Francisco, California. Since AT&T Park hosts the San Francisco Giants, the stadium had to be converted for the bowl game. Both teams were on the same sideline. As the designated visiting team, the Navy Midshipmen wore white jerseys, pants, and helmets; the Arizona State Sun Devils wore black jerseys, white pants and white helmets as the home team. The Sun Devils' uniform also included a black-and-white circular helmet sticker with the number 57 to honor Emerson Harvey, the school's first African American student athlete in 1937. In a pregame ceremony, Will Sutton received the 2012 Pat Tillman Defensive Player of the Year award as the best defensive player in the Pac-12 Conference. Before kickoff, the Midshipmen marched onto the field in service dress. The Glide Memorial Church Ensemble performed "The Star-Spangled Banner" with a 100-yard (91 m) American flag. At the end of the national anthem, four United States Navy F/A-18 Hornet aircraft flew over the stadium. Arizona Senator John McCain performed the game's coin toss with a chocolate and vanilla Oreo (representing the game's sponsor, Kraft Foods).

=== Media coverage ===
The game was televised on ESPN2 with Dave Pasch providing the play-by-play, Brian Griese providing color commentary and Jenn Brown with sideline coverage. About 1.1 million people watched the game on television, giving it a Nielsen rating of 0.7. Live online streaming was available through WatchESPN. ESPN struck a deal with Twitter to provide game highlights with expanded tweets. The game was also broadcast on many radio stations; Touchdown Radio featured Roxy Bernstein with the play-by-play and Gino Torretta the color commentary. It was also available on Sirius and XM satellite radio on SiriusXM channel 91. Each school had their own respective radio networks cover the game. Navy's broadcast team consisted of Bob Socci providing play-by-play, Omar Nelson handling analysis, and Pete Medhurst handling sideline coverage and pre- and post-game workings; the coverage was aired on Navy Sports Network. Arizona State's IMG Sports Network covered the game for the Sun Devils. Tim Healey, Jeff Van Raaphorst, and Doug Franz provided play-by-play, analysis, and sideline coverage, respectively, for ASU. Television coverage began during Arizona State's first play from scrimmage, because a basketball game between the University of North Carolina Tar Heels and the UNLV Runnin' Rebels went beyond its allotted time slot.

=== First quarter ===
The game began when Navy's Colin Amerau hit the opening kickoff into the endzone for a touchback. Beginning at the 25-yard line, Arizona State quarterback Taylor Kelly completed an eight-yard pass to receiver Jamal Miles. Running back Cameron Marshall ran the ball on the following two plays, picking up four and seven yards and the team's opening first down on the latter. Kelly passed the ball to Miles on the following play, picking up five yards. On a third-down and one, running back Marion Grice rushed for 18 yards, picking up the first down. Grice, whose brother was murdered the previous week and was "playing with a heavy heart" as Sports Illustrated put it, ran the following two plays, picking up a total of 17 yards and another first down. Arizona State scored on the following play, with a 16-yard pass from Kelly to Rashad Ross. Kicker Alex Garoutte converted the extra point, then kicked off to Navy's Gee-Gee Green, who returned it for 18 yards. Navy gained a total of two yards on its first two plays, on runs from quarterback Keenan Reynolds and fullback Noah Copeland. On the following play, Reynolds was sacked by linebacker Carl Bradford, and punter Pablo Beltran came out and punted the ball to Arizona State's 40-yard line. Reynolds landed awkwardly on his elbow during the sack, and afterward conferred with trainers on the sidelines.

Arizona State began their second drive of the game with a nine-yard run when Kelly faked a hand-off and kept the ball. The next play, freshman running back D. J. Foster carried the ball for a one-yard gain, picking up a first down and moving Arizona State to midfield. Kelly ran the ball again the following play, faking a hand-off to Grice before getting to the outside for a pick up 20 yards and another first down. Following a dropped pass by tight end Chris Coyle, Kelly completed back to back passes to Foster for gains of three and eight yards, respectively. In Navy's red zone for the second time, Grice picked up nine yards for ASU. After Grice's gain, Navy took their first time-out of the half. Grice received the ball again on the next play and took it through a gap in the offensive line for a ten-yard touchdown, his second of the game. Garoutte made the extra point, and Navy's Greene returned the kickoff to the 25-yard line.

Navy began their second drive with a two-yard run by Reynolds, who fumbled the ball when tackled. However, he was ruled down by contact by the side judge. After a six-yard completion from Reynolds to Greene, the former kept the ball again on an option run and picked up only a single yard. Faced with a short fourth down, Reynolds pitched the ball to Greene, who ran it to the outside for an eleven-yard gain, picking up an important first down. The following play, Copeland received the hand-off and rushed for a three-yard gain. Navy brought in backup sophomore running back Geoffrey Whiteside, who picked up three yards and moved the Midshipmen into ASU territory for the first time. After that, Reynolds attempted a hurried pass to Greene, who dropped the ball. The offense caught a break, however, when Arizona State received a fifteen-yard penalty for roughing the passer due to head contact with Reynolds. With a new set of downs, Copeland again rushed for a three-yard gain. Greene followed him with a one-yard pick-up, but on third down, Reynolds threw a screen pass to Copeland, who was tackled for a one-yard loss. Navy again attempted a fourth-down conversion, but turned the ball over on downs after Greene dropped a pass from Reynolds in the end zone.

The Sun Devils took over possession at their own thirty-one, beginning with an incomplete pass from Kelley to Grice. ASU followed the play with a hand-off to Grice, who took the ball eighteen yards for a first down. Grice ran the ball on the following play, picking up five yards and moving the Sun Devils into Navy territory. T. J. Foster was injured on the next play due to a head-to-head collision while trying to catch a pass from Kelley, and Arizona State accepted a fifteen-yard penalty for the helmet-to-helmet collision. However, Foster suffered a concussion on the play, and had to leave for the rest of the game. Following the penalty, Kelley kept the ball and ran for an eleven-yard pickup, again getting his team into the red zone. ASU's following two plays both resulted in gains of two yards, one on a run from Grice and the other on a pass from Kelley to Coyle. Facing a third and long, Kelley threw to Grice, who picked up 14 yards and the first down. Now two yards from the end zone, Grice was stopped immediately on a run, managing only to fall forward for a yard's gain. Kelley picked up the remaining yard on a keep on the next play, scoring the Sun Devils' third touchdown of the quarter. Garoutte made the extra point and kicked off to Greene, who only managed to return it to his own sixteen. Navy ended the quarter with a two-yard loss on a run by Reynolds.

=== Second quarter ===
Navy began the second quarter on their own fourteen-yard line. Faced with a second-and-twelve, Reynolds handed the ball off to Greene, who picked up 15 yards and a first down. The Midshipmen followed the gain with a rush by Copeland, who managed only a single yard. Their next play, another run by Greene, gained 11 yards, and another first down. The Midshipmen went to the air on the following play on a five-yard reception by Copeland from Reynolds. Navy's biggest play of the half came on the next play, when slotback Chris Swain broke down the sideline for 36 yards, moving the Midshipmen into Arizona State territory for the first time. Reynolds kept the ball on the following two plays, giving Navy gains of eight and one yard, respectively. Facing a third-and-one from the Sun Devils' nine-yard line, Navy used their second time-out, which stopped the game clock at 10:43. Reynolds ran the ball for a third straight time, getting Navy its first down. After another rush by Reynolds, ASU took their first timeout of the half, pausing the clock at 9:30. The Midshipmen returned to the air following the timeout; after dodging an unblocked Arizona State defender, Reynolds completed a pass to receiver Matt Aiken in the end zone for a three-yard touchdown. Kicker Nick Sloan converted the extra point.

Navy brought in kicker Colin Amerau for the kickoff; despite a deep kick, back to the ASU four-yard line, the Sun Devils started their next drive with the best field position of the half after Miles managed a 41-yard return. Taking advantage of the situation, Arizona State scored just five plays later. They began the drive with a three-yard rush from Cameron Marshall. ASU went to the air on the following two plays, both of which resulted in major yardage gains. The first was a sixteen-yard completion between Kelley and Coyle, while the second went to Marshall, which picked up 20 yards. Already in Navy's red zone, the Sun Devils caught a break on the next play, when Navy was called for a substitution infraction. After accepting the five-yard penalty, Kelley completed a third-straight pass, this time to receiver Alonzo Agwuenu for an eleven-yard touchdown. Now with a 28–7 lead, Garoutte completed the extra point and kicked off to Greene, who returned the ball to the 21-yard line.

Navy began their drive with back-to-back rushes by Geoffrey Whiteside, which went for gains of sixteen and two yards, including a first down on the former. Copeland then received the ball for the following two plays, both of which were also runs. After a short gain on the first, Copeland gave the Midshipmen a first down on the second, an eleven-yard pickup. After that, Reynolds kept the ball and managed eight yards, enough to move Navy into Sun Devils' territory. Swain came in for the next play and took the hand-off for a first down and six yards. The ball went back to Whiteside the next play, who picked up two yards, which were lost by Reynolds on a rush the following play. Stuck facing a third-and-ten, Navy gave the ball back to Copeland, who got them the first down on a thirteen-yard rush. In ASU's red zone for the second consecutive time, Navy went back to Copeland, who moved them forward three yards. Aiken received the hand-off on the resulting play and took it for a six-yard gain. Now with a third-and-one, Reynolds attempted to run the ball, on the team's twelfth consecutive rushing play. He lost three yards, setting up Navy for a short field goal instead of a touchdown opportunity. However, the Midshipmen mismanaged the clock and were penalized five yards for a delay of game. As a result, Nick Sloan missed the thirty-four-yard field goal attempt on the following play, ad Navy turned the ball over to the Sun Devils for the second time.

Arizona State, starting om their own twenty due to Sloan's miss, were again able to capitalize on a mistake from the Midshipmen. Navy was called on a fifteen-yard penalty for pass interference, which the Sun Devils accepted. Now on his own thirty-five, Kelley quickly completed a thirteen-yard pass to Miles for another first down. Almost already in Navy territory, Arizona State's largest play of the game came on a fifty-two-yard touchdown reception between Kelley and Rashad Ross. Garoutte came out to convert the extra point, but missed the kick, leaving the score at 34–7. Navy began their drive after a short kickoff from Garoutte was returned by Whiteside to the twenty-six. Following ASU's three-play, nineteen-second long drive, the Midshipmen were left with just fifty-five seconds left in the half. Reynolds started out Navy's drive with two consecutive throws; the first was for a single yard to Brandon Turner while the second was an incompletion, which at least stopped the play clock. Already stuck with a third-and-nine, Reynolds decided to run the ball, picking up thirteen yards and the first down. Now with a little time to plan due to the change of downs, Navy decided to return to passing plays. However, both of Reynolds' two attempts fell incomplete. Faced with very little time left in the half and a third-and-ten, the Midshipmen handed the ball off to Greene for six yards, and simply ran out the clock.

=== Third quarter ===
Navy received the ball to start the second half. Garoutte hit the kickoff deep into the end zone and Greene simply took a knee, resulting in a touchback. Reynolds kicked off the Midshipmen's drive with a seven-yard run up the middle of the field. On the following play, Reynolds overthrew receiver Brandon Turner while under pressure. Arizona State cornerback Robert Nelson, Jr. intercepted the pass at his own forty and tried to return it, but while avoiding Turner, he collided with a teammate and lost six yards. Beginning at their own thirty-four, ASU began the drive with a hand-off to Marshall, who ran it down the middle for six yards. The Sun Devils ran the same play again, this time for a first down after Marshall forced his way through several tacklers. Kelley attempted to run the ball on the next play, but was immediately pressured and forced to dump the ball off to Coyle. Now at midfield, Kelley faked a hand-off to Marshall and threw the ball deep to a wide-open Ross, who outran a tackler and scored another ASU touchdown. Garoutte converted the point after, then hit a deep kick to Greene; Navy's return specialist barely managed to get out to the twenty before getting hit by several Arizona State defenders.

Reynolds began the Midshipmen's drive with a five-yard rush after he kept the ball on an option run. Linebacker Brandon Magee, who made the tackle on Reynolds, stayed on the ground after the play, requiring time to be stopped. After he was assisted to the sideline, it was discovered he had severely injured his elbow and was unable to return. The clock was started again, and the following play, Reynolds quickly pitched to Greene, who avoided several tacklers and ran down the sideline for a twenty-yard gain. Copeland took the following hand-off and forced his way forward for six yards. Reynolds kept it the next play and picked up a first down for the Midshipmen. However, Reynolds was sacked both of the following times, taken down each time by Will Sutton. Facing a third-and-twenty-three, Reynolds simply ran the ball to give the punter better field position. Pablo Beltran punted the ball deep into ASU territory, where it was fielded out of bounds by Jamal Miles on the seven.

The Sun Devils' next drive added another touchdown to make the score 48–7. Midshipmen Gee Gee Greene returned the ensuing kickoff 95 yards for a touchdown; three plays later, Arizona State's Marion Grice ran 39 yards for another Sun Devils touchdown to make the score 55–14. ASU needed one play to reach the end zone again on its next drive, and the third quarter ended with the Sun Devils ahead 62–14.

=== Fourth quarter ===
Arizona State began the fourth quarter with a turnover on downs, its first drive of the game not ending in a touchdown. During the next drive, Keenan Reynolds was tackled hard after pitching the ball and did not play for the rest of the game. Freshman fullback Chris Swain scored Navy's first offensive points of the second half. Using mostly second-string offensive players, the Sun Devils committed their only turnover of the day when quarterback Michael Eubank fumbled the ball when he was injured on a third-down play near midfield. The Midshipmen scored the final touchdown of the game when quarterback Trey Miller threw a 23-yard pass to Brandon Turner with 5:16 left in the game. Arizona State ran out the clock for its final possession, and the game ended with a final score of 62–28.

=== Scoring summary ===
Scoring summary

Quarter	Time	Drive			Team	Scoring information	Score	
Quarter	Time	Plays	Yards	TOP	Team	Scoring information	Navy	Arizona State
1	12:43	8	75	2:17	Arizona State	Rashad Ross 16-yard touchdown reception from Taylor Kelly, Alex Garoutte kick good	0	7
1	8:42	8	60	2:23	Arizona State	Marion Grice 10-yard touchdown run, Alex Garoutte kick good	0	14
1	:08	9	69	2:30	Arizona State	Taylor Kelly 1-yard touchdown run, Alex Garoutte kick good	0	21
2	9:24	11	84	5:37	Navy	Matt Aiken 3-yard touchdown reception from Keenan Reynolds, Nick Sloan kick good	7	21
2	7:56	4	55	1:21	Arizona State	Alonzo Agwuenu 11-yard touchdown reception from Taylor Kelly, Alex Garoutte kick good	7	28
2	:55	2	80	:19	Arizona State	Rashad Ross 52-yard touchdown reception from Taylor Kelly, Alex Garoutte kick no good	7	34
3	13:24	4	66	:55	Arizona State	Rashad Ross 50-yard touchdown reception from Taylor Kelly, Alex Garoutte kick good	7	41
3	6:24	9	93	2:43	Arizona State	Cameron Marshall 1-yard touchdown run, Alex Garoutte kick good	7	48
3			95		Navy	Gee Gee Greene kickoff return, Nick Sloan kick good	14	48
3	5:17	3	64	:46	Arizona State	Marion Grice 39-yard touchdown run, Alex Garoutte kick good	14	55
3	3:39	1	33	:11	Arizona State	Cameron Marshall 33-yard touchdown run, Alex Garoutte kick good	14	62
4	10:17	5	77	1:44	Navy	Chris Swain 46-yard touchdown run, Nick Sloan kick good	21	62
4	5:16	5	46	1:57	Navy	Brandon Turner 23-yard touchdown reception from Trey Miller, Nick Sloan kick good	28	62
"TOP" = time of possession. For other American football terms, see Glossary of American football.							28	62

== Final statistics ==
Chart showing each scoring drive from both teams.

Statistical comparison
	Navy	ASU
1st downs	18	36
Total yards	350	648
Passing yards	37	268
Rushing yards	313	380
Penalties	6–78	2–25
3rd-down conversions	5–14	5–7
4th-down conversions	2–3	0–1
Turnovers	1	1
Time of possession	33:21	26:39

With five tackles and 2.5 sacks, Will Sutton was named the game's most valuable defensive player. Marion Grice, with 159 yards rushing and two touchdowns, was named the game's offensive MVP. Although the Midshipmen led the game in time of possession, Arizona State's offense needed a little under nine minutes of game time to score five touchdowns in the first half and its first nine touchdowns used a total of 13:38. The Sun Devils set 20 Kraft Fight Hunger Bowl records, including most total yards gained and largest margin of victory. With 36 first downs, the team also tied the NCAA Division I bowl-game record set by the Oklahoma Sooners in the 1991 Gator Bowl and the Marshall Thundering Herd at the 2001 GMAC Bowl. Arizona State quarterback Taylor Kelly completed 17 of 19 passes for 268 yards and four touchdowns, setting a school record for completion percentage in a season; with four receptions, tight end Chris Coyle set a school record for completions by a tight end in a season with 57. Midshipmen running back Gee Gee Greene set a Kraft Fight Hunger Bowl game record with his 95-yard kickoff return, also a Navy bowl-game record.

== After the game ==
The win brought the Sun Devils' record to 8–5. Coach Todd Graham was pleased with his team's offensive production, praising Kelly and offensive coordinator Mike Norvell. The team's overall success surprised ESPN.com Pac-12 analyst Ted Miller, who called his prediction that ASU finished 11th in their conference his "worst projection" of the spring. Arizona State punter Josh Hubner accepted an invitation to play in the 2013 East–West Shrine Game. In January 2013, Will Sutton announced that he would return to play for Arizona State during his senior season before entering the 2014 NFL draft.

The loss brought Navy's record to 8–5. Midshipmen back Gee Gee Greene played in the Raycom All-Star Football Classic on January 19 in Montgomery, Alabama, and receiver Brandon Turner played in the Casino Del Sol All-Star game on January 11 in Tucson, Arizona.
