= East Aldine, Texas =

State management district in Texas, US

Coordinates: 29.8998°N 95.3439°W

East Aldine is a state management district in Harris County, Texas, United States, mostly in unincorporated areas, with some territory in the City of Houston. The East Aldine Improvement District, also known as the Aldine Management District, governs the area. Portions of the district coincide with the boundaries of the Aldine census-designated place. One park owned by the City of Houston, Keith-Wiess Park, is within the district limits.

== History ==
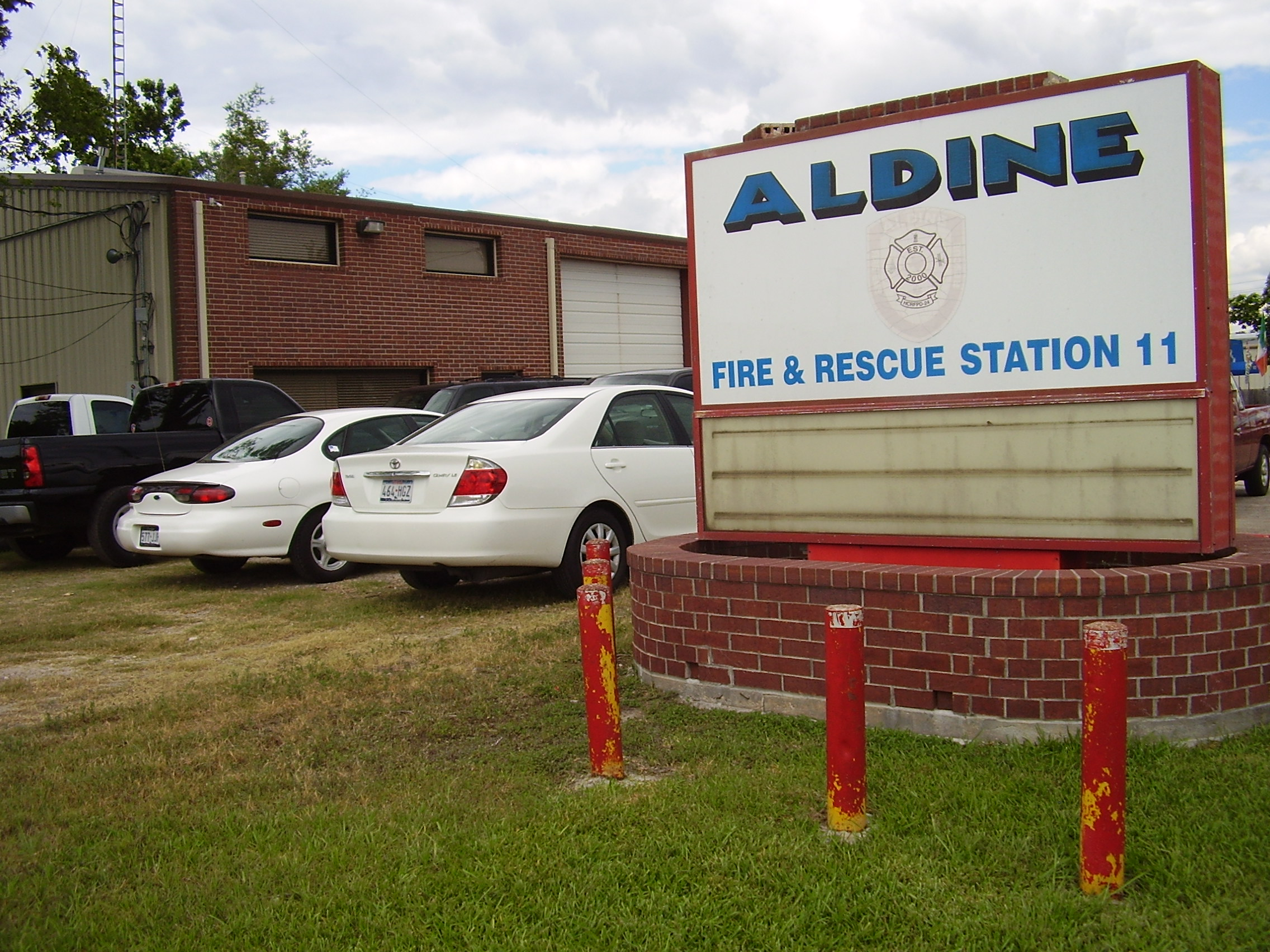
Aldine Fire & Rescue Station 11

Created in June 2001, the East Aldine Management District was established by the Texas Legislature as a governmental entity to help enhance the physical, economic, and social well-being of the East Aldine area. Its services are supported by a 1-cent sales tax on retail sales adopted in August 2001 and enacted in January 2002; as of 2015, the tax is estimated to bring in $5.5 million in yearly revenue for the district’s projects.

The district uses a service plan, implemented in August 2002 by its board of directors, to identify and respond to the issues of and potential improvements to the district’s environment, public safety, economy, mobility & transportation, and water & sewer facilitation. The plan is based on a 1998 study by the Harris County Community Development Department that identified the aforementioned issues as matters of precedence of the community and its residents.

In 2005, the district, along with other management districts and the Houston Airport System as part of the North Corridor Coalition, asked the state government to propose alternatives for expansion of Interstate 45. As of May 2015, public meetings are ongoing to present the project to area citizens and receive feedback.

== Demographics ==
A 2010 census concluded just over 49,000 people resided in the district, with a projected 52,500 residents in 2015. The census showed that the population was 49.3% white, 9.8% black, 1.1% Asian, and 39.8% other ethnicities, with 77.8% being of Hispanic origin (any race).

== Cityscape ==
Divided by Halls Bayou and Greens Bayou, the 16 square miles (41,000,000 m^{2}) district is roughly bordered by U.S. Route 59 to the east, the Hardy Toll Road to the west, Aldine Bender to the north, and Little York Road to the south. The district government estimates that the district is 15 minutes driving distance from Downtown Houston, and is in proximity to the Houston Ship Channel, the Port of Houston, and George Bush Intercontinental Airport.

There is a statue of John F. Kennedy by David Adickes, which weighs five tons. It is near the airport entrance on John F. Kennedy Boulevard. It was intended as a symbol of welcoming travelers. It was put in place in January 2023.

== Government and infrastructure ==
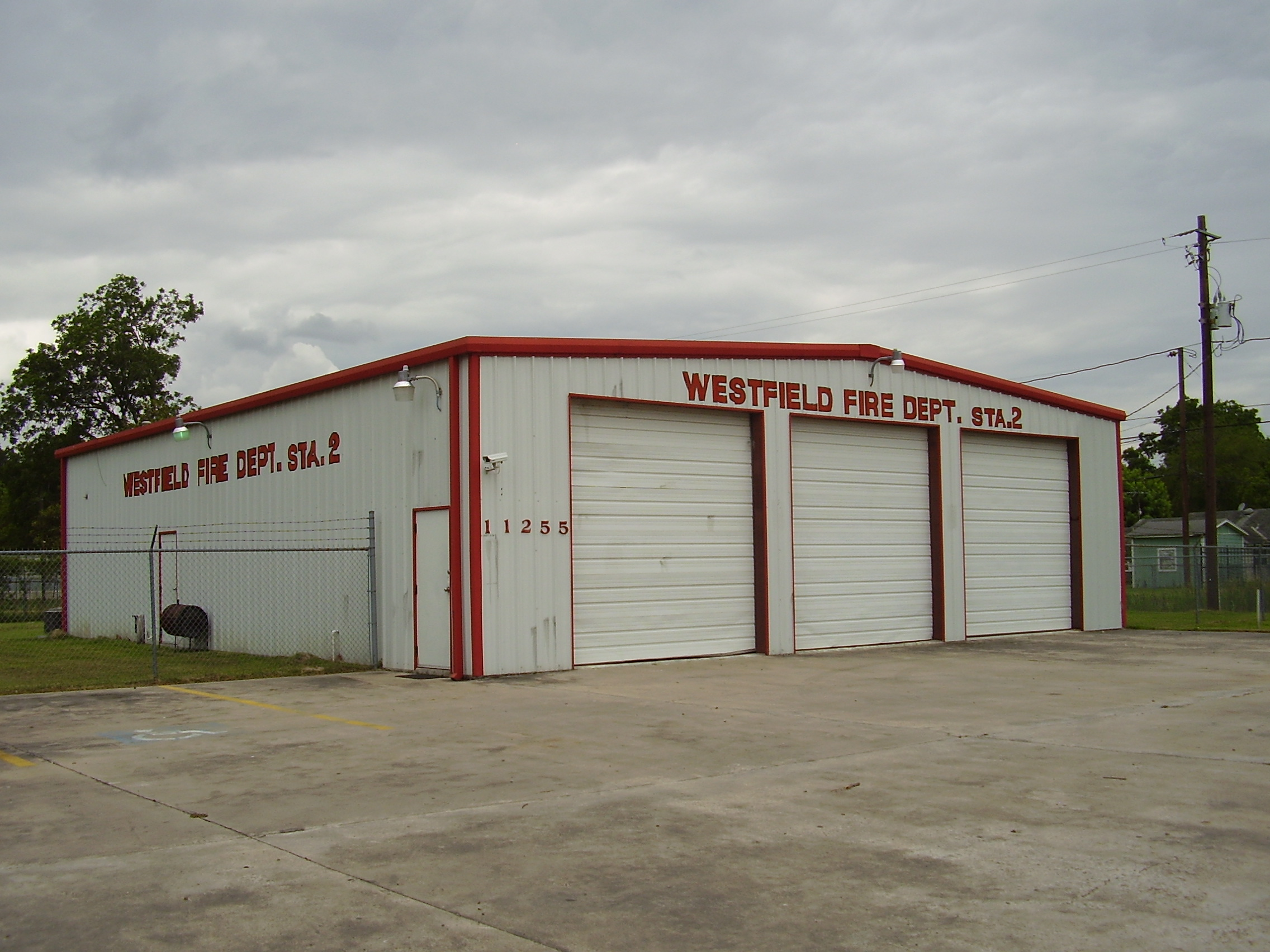
West Fire Station 2

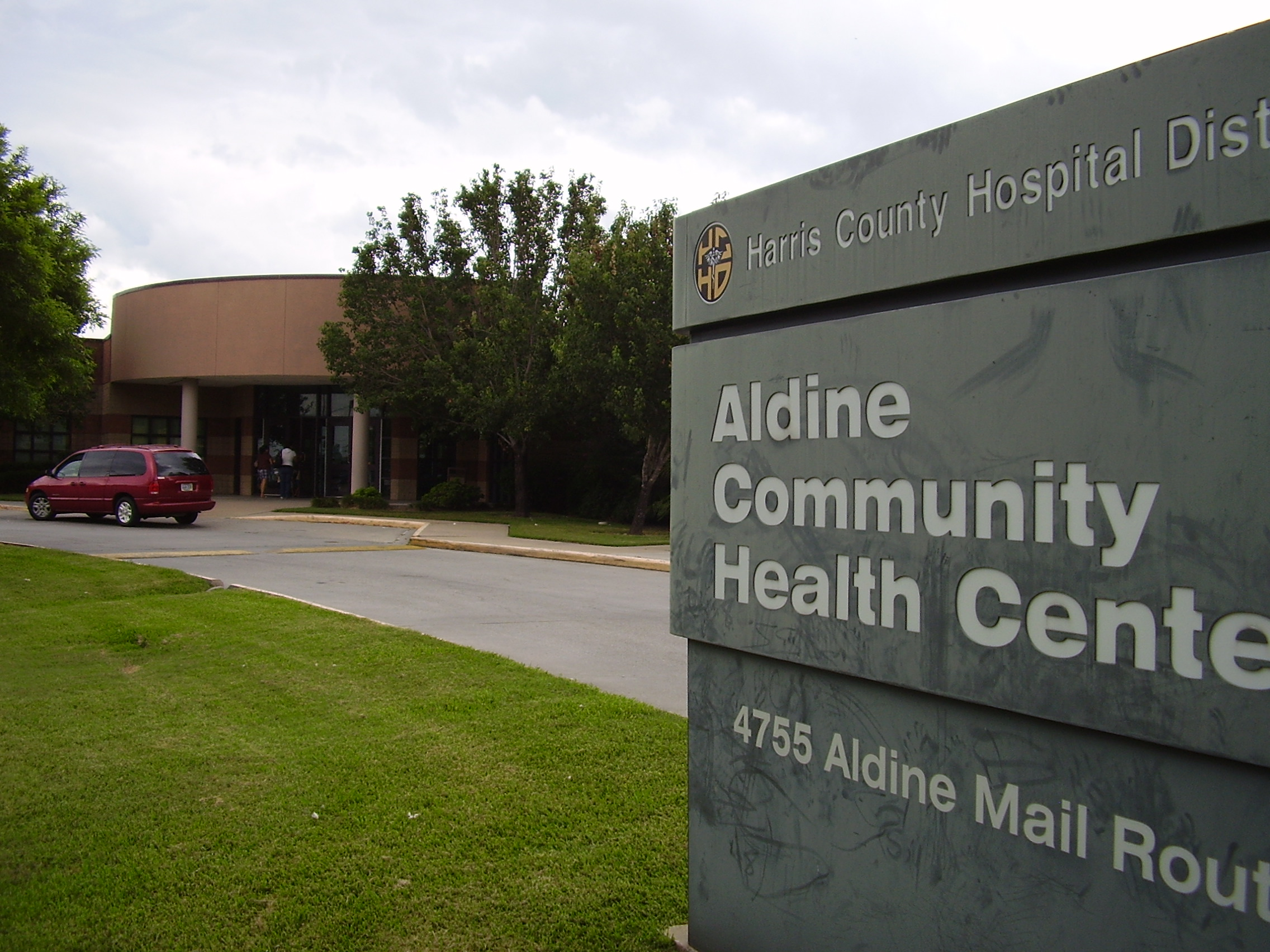
Aline Community Health Center

The East Aldine Management District, headquartered at 5333 Aldine Mail Route, generates revenue through a one-cent sales tax that is estimated to generate $5.5 million in annual revenue for 2015. The district is governed by a volunteer board of directors, consisting of nine members serving staggered four-year terms.

Almost half of Aldine residents use private water wells and septic systems as their main source of water, while the remaining receive service from an estimated 10 municipal utility districts.

After a study in 2004 revealed the financial need for water- and sewer-based improvements in the districts amounting to over $200 million, the district began neighborhood-focused improvements. Through these smaller-scale projects, the district has successfully improved subdivisions and neighborhoods like Tasfield (near U.S. Route 59 and Little York Road) and the North Houston Heights through grants from the Community Development Block Grant Program and the Texas Water Development Board, and agreements with the City of Houston and the Sunbelt Fresh Water Supply District, among others. Future improvement plans encompassing eastern district neighborhoods, such as Westfield Estates and the Southwest Utilities service area, are estimated to amount to $31 million, with over half to be paid through local, state and federal grants. These improvements would provide approximately 2,500 more homes and several hundred businesses with safer, more dependable sewer and water facilities.

Areas within the Aldine CDP are served by Aldine Fire & Rescue, while The Westfield Volunteer Fire Department serves unincorporated areas outside of the Aldine CDP. Emergency medical services are provided by Harris County Emergency Services District #1, also known as HCESD-1.

=== County, state, and federal representation ===
Most of East Aldine is in Harris County precinct 2, while some portions are in County Precinct 1.

Harris County Hospital District operates the Aldine Health Center at 4755 Aldine Mail Route in the district. The community is served by Harris County Sheriff's Office District II Patrol, headquartered from the Humble Substation at 7900 Will Clayton Parkway in Humble. The Aldine Community Storefront is located at 5333 Aldine Mail Route in the district.

== Transportation ==
Metropolitan Transit Authority of Harris County, Texas (METRO) provides public transportation. George Bush Intercontinental Airport is in proximity to East Aldine.

== Education ==
=== Primary and secondary schools ===
==== Aldine Independent School District ====
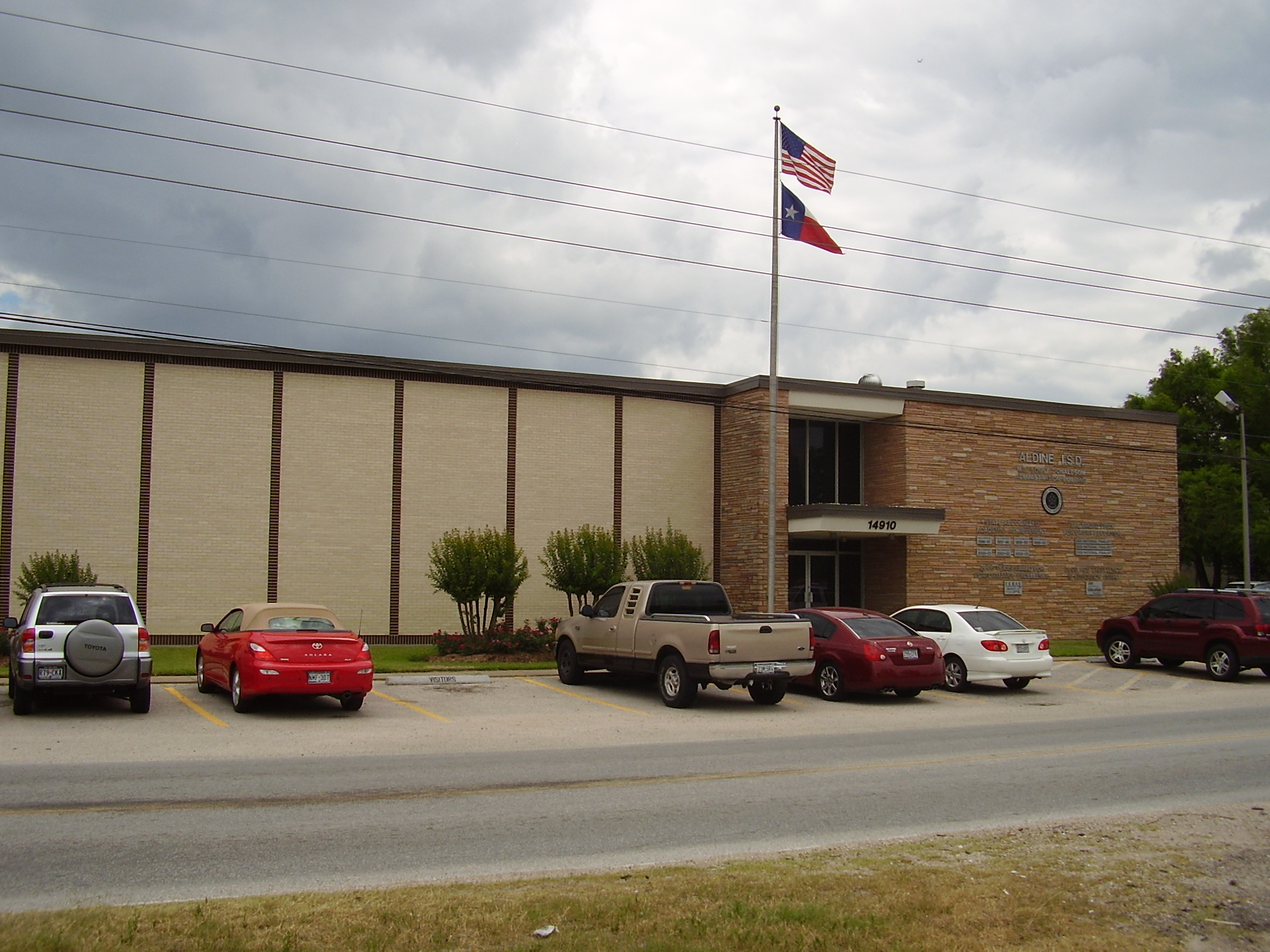
M. B. Sonny Donaldson Administration Building, the former headquarters of the Aldine Independent School District

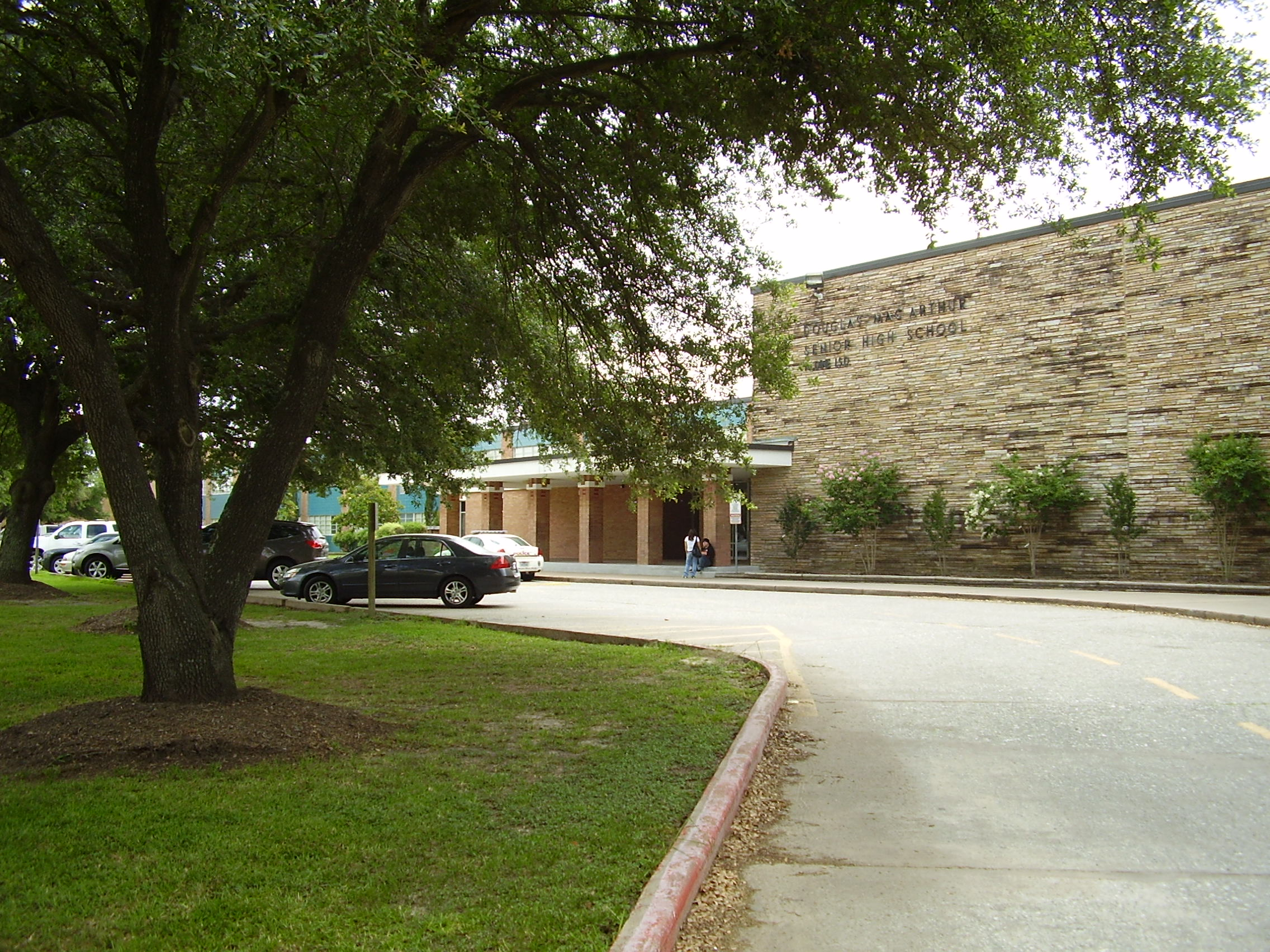
MacArthur High School

Almost all residents are located in the Aldine Independent School District, which was formerly headquartered in East Aldine.

PreK Centers within East Aldine include: DeSantiago, Garcia-Leza, Hinojosa, and Lauder.

Elementary schools within East Aldine include: Calvert, Eckert, Escamilla, Francis, Johnson, Oleson, Orange Grove, Raymond, Reed, Stephens, and Worsham. The Colonial Hills area is served by Odom Elementary. Escamilla, Eckert, and Reed were formerly grade 5-6 intermediate schools.

Middle schools within East Aldine and serving sections of it include Aldine, Grantham, Hambrick, and Lauder.

High schools serving East Aldine include MacArthur in East Aldine and Nimitz outside of East Aldine. The Colonial Hills area is served by Aldine High School.

The Lane School, a special K-12 school, and the Wilmer T. Hall Center for Education, another special school, are within the East Aldine boundaries.

==== Houston Independent School District ====
There are a few residents in the Houston Independent School District. Some areas are zoned to Scarborough Elementary School, and some areas are zoned to Barrick Elementary School. All of the portion in Houston ISD is zoned to Patrick Henry Middle School, and Sam Houston High School.

==== Charter schools ====
State charter schools in East Aldine include YES Prep North Central.

=== Colleges and universities ===
Residents of the Aldine ISD portion are located in the Lone Star College System. Lone Star College-North Harris is in proximity to East Aldine.

Residents of the Houston ISD portion are located in the Houston Community College district.

=== Public libraries ===
Harris County Public Library operates the High Meadows Branch Library at 4500 Aldine Mail Route in East Aldine. The 9,500-square-foot (880 m^{2}) library opened in 1983 on land deeded to the county library system by the Aldine Independent School District.

== Parks and recreation ==
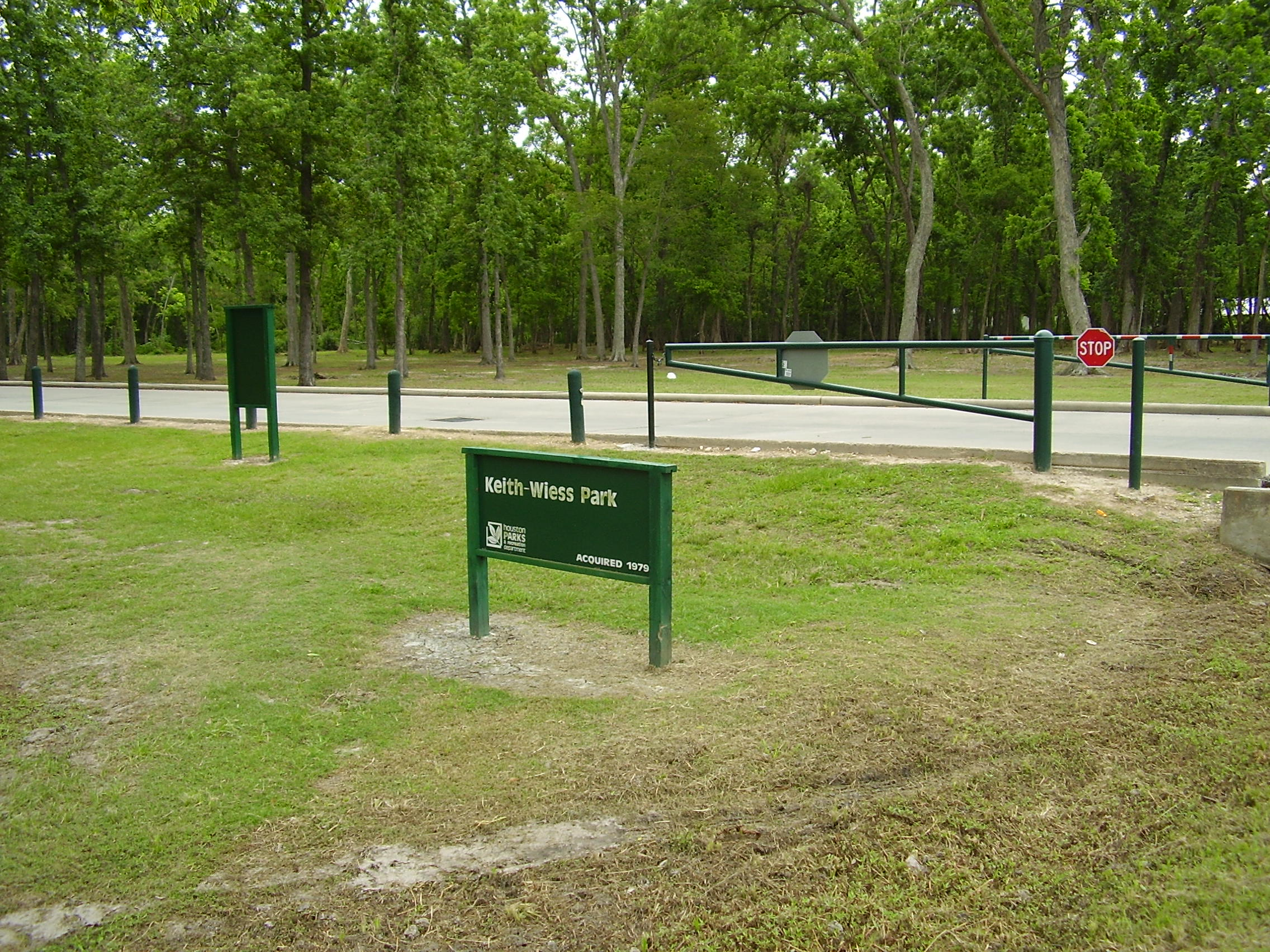
Keith-Wiess Park

Parks operated by the government of Harris County include W.E. "Bill" Crowley Park, James Driver Park, Dow One Park, and Gerber Park.

Crowley Park, operated by Harris County Precinct One, is located in East Aldine. It was named after W.E. "Bill" Crowley, who was the General Superintendent for Roads and Bridges for Precinct Four of the county. E.A. Squatty Lyons, who at one time served as the Harris County commissioner, wrote a letter dated April 14, 1977 requesting that the park be named after Crowley. The park includes three baseball fields, a basketball pavilion, an exercise station, three parking lots, picnic tables spread throughout the park, three playgrounds, three sets of wings, tennis courts, toilet facilities, and a .5 mile jogging trail.

City of Houston-operated parks include Keith-Wiess Park and Hirsch Road Park. Keith-Wiess Park is in the Houston city limits. Hirsch Road Park is in an unincorporated area.
