= Bordersville, Houston =

Coordinates: 30°00′05″N 95°17′38″W

Bordersville
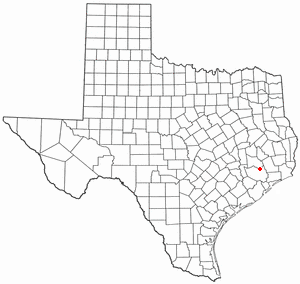
- Location in the state of Texas
- Country: United States
- State: Texas
- County: Harris County

Government
  - Junior Chamber Of Commerce: The Bordersville

Area
  - Total: 9.4 sq mi (24 km^{2})
  - Land: 7.6 sq mi (20 km^{2})
  - Water: 2.2 sq mi (5.7 km^{2})

Population (2007)
  - Total: 951
- Time zone: UTC-6 (CST)
  - Summer (DST): UTC-5 (CDT)

Bordersville is a predominantly African American community on Farm to Market Road 1960 in northeast Harris County, Texas, United States. The community, located less than one half-mile from George Bush Intercontinental Airport, has about 80% of its territory in the City of Houston and the rest in an unincorporated area.

== History ==
Bordersville was established in an unincorporated section of Harris County, Texas in 1927 after the closing of a sawmill in the nearby city of Humble. African Americans formerly employed at the mill were forced to leave. A man named Edgar Borders opened a mill close in proximity to the closed sawmill and employed some of the former Humble sawmill workers. Borders created wooden shacks to house workers.

In 1940, Bordersville contained 100 residents. Bordersville, served by the Aldine Independent School District, was five miles from the closest public schools. Bordersville was around thirty-five miles from Ben Taub Hospital, grocery stores, and libraries. Borders closed the mill in 1941. During the same year, he rented and sold the land within Bordersville to its residents.

Borders died in 1963. Most Bordersville citizens did not own their land. No individuals forced the Bordersville residents out of their homes. Throughout the 1960s, A. W. Jones and other residents founded a civic club which became the Bordersville Neighborhood Council. Many citizens became members of the Houston Junior Chambers of Commerce. Some citizens created a water well, and others painted area houses.

The City of Houston annexed about 80% of Bordersville in 1965. During that year, the basic housing and the lack of paved streets, running water, and sewers convinced some Houstonians that Bordersville had the most severe poverty in the city limits. Residents paid city taxes and did not receive city utilities. Jerry Wood, executive assistant in the Planning and Development Department of the City of Houston, said in a 1998 Houston Chronicle article that the city followed easily tracked survey lines when it adopted the annexation plan of 1965 and that it did not intentionally exclude any part of Bordersville. The city of Houston stated that Bordersville was "the worst pocket of poverty in the city."

The Three H Service Center, referring to Houston, Humble, and Harris County, opened in 1974. The center, serving people living within a twenty-mile radius, opened partly due to a $196,000 United States dollar grant from the United States Department of Commerce's Economic Development Administration. Architect John Zemanek designed the facility, consisting of nine low-rise buildings. The Three H Service Center received funding from Houston and federal agencies and local churches. With a volunteer staff, the center established various services, including day care, tutoring, a health clinic, public bathing facilities for homeless, a senior citizen center, literacy classes, youth and elderly employment, and summer recreational activities.

In 1975, Bordersville had 550 residents. Residents earned annual incomes averaging to between $2,500 and $3,500 United States dollars. Fire trucks of the Houston Fire Department delivered water for bathing, cooking, and drinking on a twice-weekly basis during 1975.

Water service lines opened in 1981. In the 1980s, the Three H Service Center collaborated in an organization of funding to install sink, bathtub, and toilet facilities in Bordersville residences. In 1985, 700 citizens lived in 120 residences in Bordersville. By 1985 cooking and heating fires had ruined many of the original Bordersville homes. Maps in the 1980s revealed four churches in the Bordersville area. During the same year, most residents cooked food on wood stoves and with outdoor appliances. The community lacked public transportation access; this increased unemployment. Social Security was the main source of income for the community, which had a disproportionate population of very young and very elderly residents. In 1985 some residents still used outhouses and some residents did not have bathtubs, sinks, and toilets in their residences.

In 1996 Thomas Phillips, a retired longshoreman and Bordersville resident, joined with representatives of Kingwood and sued the City of Houston in a federal court, arguing that the city could not legally annex areas if it did not provide certain services to some of its existing areas, including Bordersville. In 1998 Phillips advocated for the annexation of Humble Heights, an area around Carver Avenue, Dunbar Avenue, and Granger Street, into Houston; if the residents are annexed they would use the city sewer system instead of septic tanks. As of 2008 the area remains unincorporated.

A Lone Star College–Kingwood presentation about Bordersville states that the community "may possibly disappear as commercial development claims much of the land."

== Infrastructure and government ==
=== Local government ===
Bordersville is served by the Houston Police Department's Northeast Patrol Division, with headquarters at 8301 Ley Road. The Houston Fire Department serves the Houston portion and the unincorporated portion. City Council District B covers the Houston section of Bordersville. As of 2008 Jarvis Johnson represents the district.

=== County, federal, and state representation ===
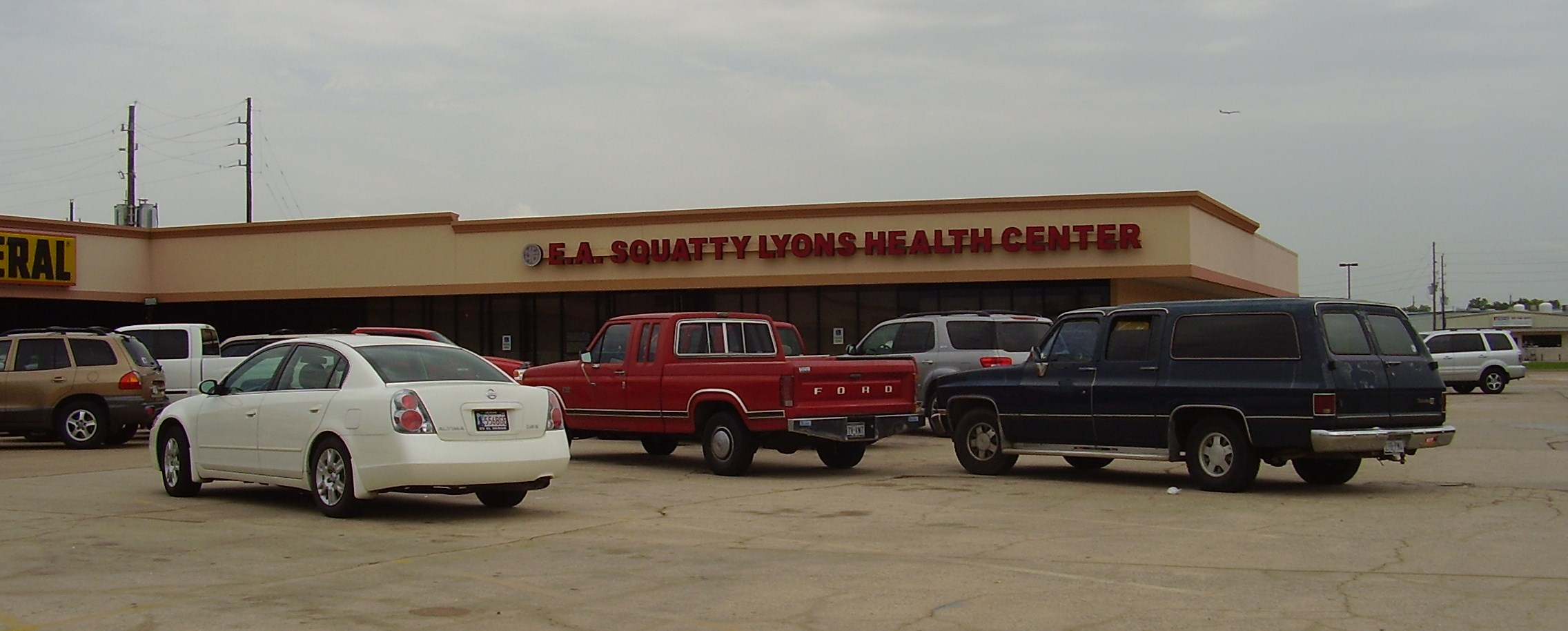
The E. A. Squatty Lyons Health Center in Humble replaced the clinic that operated in Bordersville

Bordersville is within Harris County Precinct 4. As of 2008 Jerry Eversole heads the precinct. The unincorporated part of Bordersville is served by Harris County Sheriff's Office District II Patrol, headquartered from the Humble Substation at 7900 Will Clayton Parkway in Humble. The county operated a health clinic in Bordersville. In 1991 the E. A. Squatty Lyons Health Center opened in Humble, replacing the Bordersville clinic. The Harris Health System (formerly Harris County Hospital District) designated the Lyons clinic for the ZIP code 77338. The designated public hospital is Lyndon B. Johnson Hospital in northeast Houston.

Bordersville is located in District 141 of the Texas House of Representatives. As of 2008, Senfronia Thompson represents the district. Bordersville is within District 15 of the Texas Senate; as of 2008 John Whitmire represents the district.

The community is within Texas's 18th congressional district. As of 2008 the representative is Sheila Jackson-Lee.

== Education ==
=== Primary and secondary schools ===
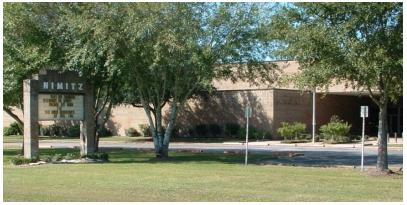
Nimitz High School

Residents are served by the Aldine Independent School District and the Lone Star College System (formerly the North Harris Montgomery Community College District).

Residents are zoned to schools outside of Bordersville in unincorporated areas, including Jones EC/PK School for early childhood education and Pre-Kindergarten, A. W. Jones Elementary School for Pre-Kindergarten through 5th Grade, Townsen Middle School in Humble for grades 6–8, and Nimitz High School and Nimitz Ninth Grade School for grades 9 through 12. Jones Elementary was dedicated on Sunday November 2, 2008.

Prior to the opening of Jones, De Santiago EC/PK & Head Start Center and Magrill Elementary School served Bordersville. Parker Intermediate School formerly served Bordersville for grades 5 and 6, and Teague Middle School formerly served Bordersville for grades 7–8.

=== Community colleges ===
Lone Star College System (formerly the North Harris Montgomery Community College District) serves the area. In 1972 residents of Aldine ISD and two other K-12 school districts voted to create the North Harris County College. The community college district began operations in the northern hemisphere fall of 1973. Lone Star College-Kingwood's Service Learning program created the Bordersville Literacy Project.
