= Josh Huff =

American football player (born 1991)

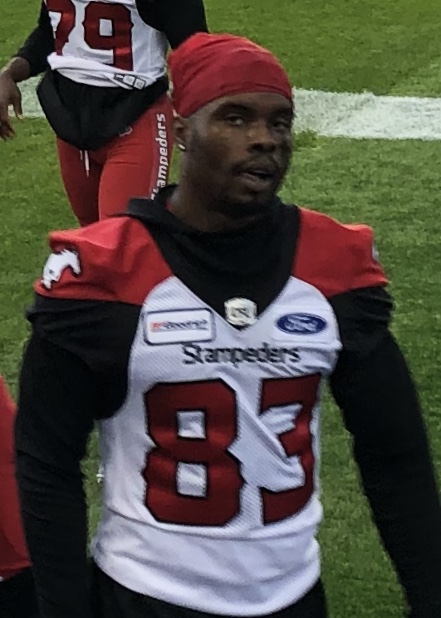
- Huff with the Calgary Stampeders in 2019

No. 11, 13, 15, 9
- Position: Wide receiver

Personal information
- Born: October 14, 1991 (age 35); Houston, Texas, U.S.
- Listed height: 5 ft 11 in (1.80 m)
- Listed weight: 202 lb (92 kg)

Career information
- High school: Nimitz (Houston)
- College: Oregon (2010–2013)
- NFL draft: 2014: 3rd round, 86th overall pick

Career history
- Philadelphia Eagles (2014–2016); Tampa Bay Buccaneers (2016); New Orleans Saints (2018)*; Arizona Hotshots (2019); Calgary Stampeders (2019–2021); Toronto Argonauts (2021)
- * Offseason or practice squad member only

Career NFL statistics
- Receptions: 51
- Receiving yards: 523
- Return yards: 1,182
- Total touchdowns: 6
- Stats at Pro Football Reference

Josh Huff (born October 14, 1991) is an American former professional football player who was a wide receiver in the National Football League (NFL) and Canadian Football League (CFL). He played college football for the Oregon Ducks and was selected by the Philadelphia Eagles in the third round of the 2014 NFL draft. He was also a member of the Tampa Bay Buccaneers, New Orleans Saints, Arizona Hotshots, Calgary Stampeders, and Toronto Argonauts.

== Early life ==
Huff attended Nimitz High School in Houston, Texas, where he was a letterman in football and track. In football, he played on the same team as fellow NFL player Marion Grice. He played quarterback, wide receiver, running back and cornerback for the Cougars, accumulating nearly 2,000 yards of total offense as a senior, as he rushed for 1,147 yards and 11 touchdowns and threw for 856 more yards. He was named a 2008 Class 5A second-team all-district on offense.

In addition to football, Huff also competed as a sprinter for the school's track & field team. He recorded a personal-best time of 10.86 seconds in the 100 meters on his way to a second-place finish at the 19-5A district meet as a junior. He was also a member of the 4 × 200m relay squad.

College recruiting
Name	Hometown	School	Height	Weight	40^{‡}	Commit date
Josh Huff; WR	Houston, Texas	Nimitz	5 ft 10 in (1.78 m)	185 lb (84 kg)	4.4	Jan 22, 2010
Josh Huff; WR	Recruit ratings: Scout: Rivals: (76)					
Overall recruit ranking: Scout: 36 (WR) Rivals: 7 (WR) ESPN: 99 (WR)
‡ Refers to 40-yard dash; Note: In many cases, Scout, Rivals, 247Sports, On3, and ESPN may conflict in their listings of height, weight and 40 time.; In these cases, the average was taken. ESPN grades are on a 100-point scale.; Sources: "2010 Oregon Football Commitments". Rivals.; "ESPN". ESPN.; "2010 Team Ranking". Rivals.com.

== College career ==
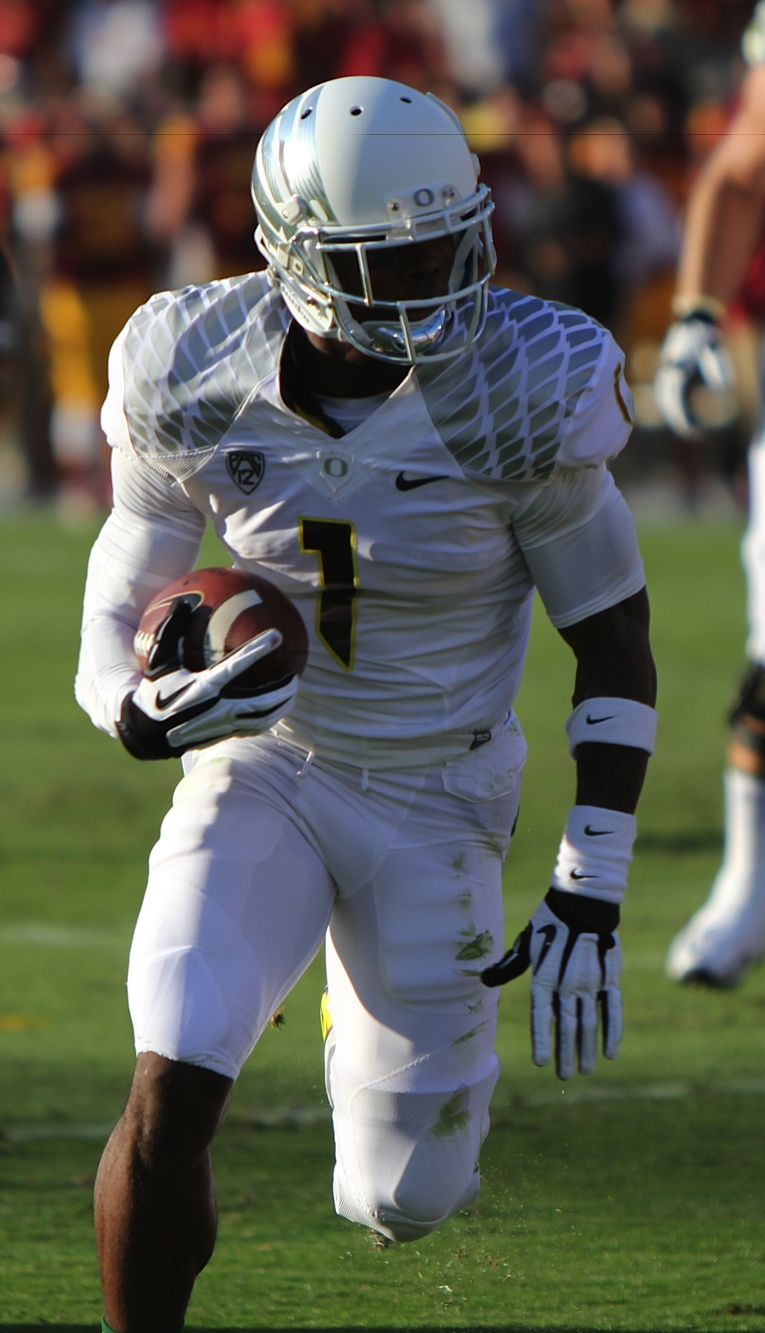
Huff with the Oregon Ducks in 2012

Huff attended the University of Oregon from 2010 to 2013. During his career, he caught 144 passes for 2,366 yards and 24 touchdowns. In his senior year, he broke the school record for receiving yards in a single season with 1,140 yards, the previous record was 1,123 yards and was set in 1970.

He was also named honorable mention All-Pac-12 Conference in both his junior and senior seasons.

== Professional career ==
Pre-draft measurables
Height	Weight	Arm length	Hand span	40-yard dash	10-yard split	20-yard split	20-yard shuttle	Three-cone drill	Vertical jump	Broad jump	Bench press
5 ft 11 1/4 in (1.81 m)	206 lb (93 kg)	31 1/4 in (0.79 m)	9 3/8 in (0.24 m)	4.51 s	1.57 s	2.58 s	4.12 s	6.96 s	35.5 in (0.90 m)	9 ft 8 in (2.95 m)	14 reps
All values from NFL Combine

=== Philadelphia Eagles ===
Huff was selected by the Philadelphia Eagles in the third round of the 2014 NFL draft with the 86th overall pick, reuniting Huff with former Oregon head coach Chip Kelly. On May 13, he signed a four-year deal with the team.

In 2014, Huff had a 107-yard opening kickoff return for a touchdown against the Tennessee Titans, the longest play in Eagles history. While Huff saw limited action as a wide receiver in 2014, his play time began to increase in 2015. In week five against the New Orleans Saints he caught his first touchdown from Sam Bradford. Against the Miami Dolphins he caught another touchdown but the Eagles were not able to win the game, eventually losing 20–19. The following week Huff caught another touchdown pass, this time from Mark Sanchez (filling in for an injured Bradford), but the Eagles lost 45–17. In 2015, after only catching 8 passes for 24 yards in his first 5 games, Huff had his best game of the young season in a win against the undefeated Minnesota Vikings, catching all 4 of his targets for 39 yards and returning a kickoff 98 yards for a touchdown. Huff followed this up with only 1 catch for 9 yards against the Dallas Cowboys but also had a 53-yard return.

On November 1, 2016, Huff was arrested with marijuana and a firearm in his vehicle. Despite statements by coach Doug Pederson that Huff would still play the following week, Huff was released by the Eagles on November 3.

=== Tampa Bay Buccaneers ===
Huff was signed to the practice squad of the Tampa Bay Buccaneers on November 7, 2016. He was promoted to the active roster on December 6, 2016. On September 2, 2017, Huff was released by the Buccaneers.

=== New Orleans Saints ===
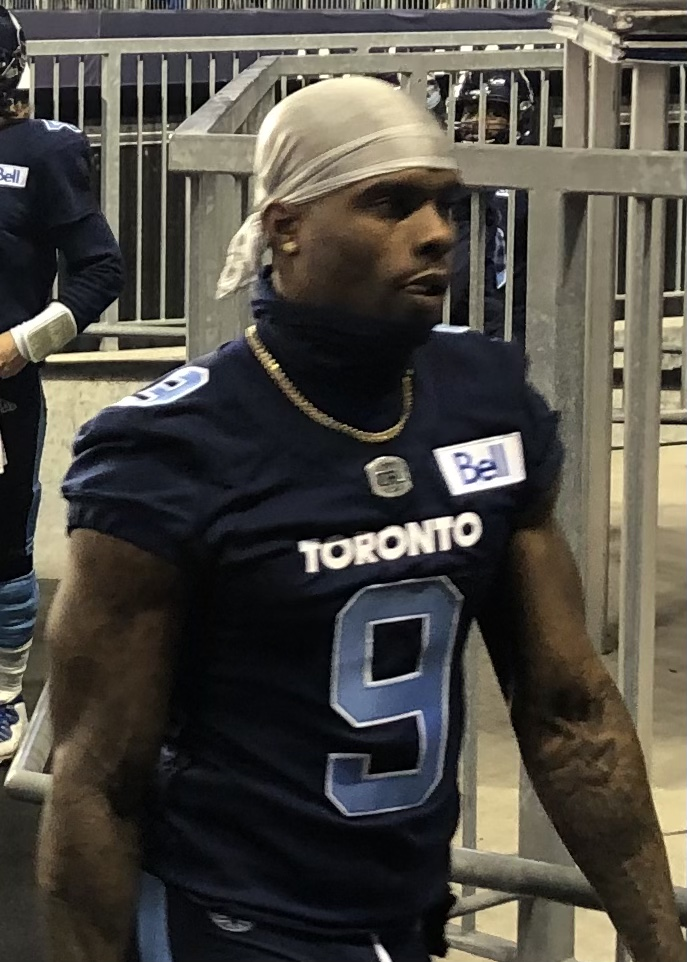
Huff with the Toronto Argonauts in 2021

On January 18, 2018, Huff signed a reserve/future contract with the New Orleans Saints. On March 19, 2018, Huff was suspended two games for violating the league's policies on substances for abuse and personal conduct stemming from a November 2016 arrest. He was released on August 21, 2018.

=== Arizona Hotshots ===
In January 2019, Huff joined the Arizona Hotshots of the Alliance of American Football (AAF). He was placed on injured reserve on March 7, 2019.

=== Calgary Stampeders ===
After the AAF ceased operations in April 2019, Huff signed with the Calgary Stampeders of the Canadian Football League (CFL) on May 8, 2019. In his first season in the league, he played in 10 games, catching 37 passes for 491 yards with one touchdown. After the CFL canceled the 2020 season due to the COVID-19 pandemic, Huff chose to opt-out of his contract with the Stampeders on August 31, 2020. He re-signed with the Stampeders on December 22, 2020. Huff played in nine games for the Stampeders in 2021, catching 37 passes for 507 yards. With only two games left in the regular season, Huff was released by the Stampeders on November 5, 2021.

=== Toronto Argonauts ===
On November 9, 2021, it was announced that Huff had signed with the Toronto Argonauts of the CFL. He became a free agent upon the expiry of his contract on February 8, 2022.

=== NFL statistics ===
Year	Team	GP	Receiving					Rushing							Kick returns				
Year	Team	GP	Rec	Yds	Avg	TD	Long	Att	Yds	Avg	Lng	TD	Fum	Lost	Att	Yds	TD	FC	Lng
2014	PHI	12	8	98	12.3	0	44	1	7	7.0	7	0	1	1	14	415	1	0	107T
2015	PHI	11	20	224	11.2	3	41	0	0	0	0	0	0	0	10	224	0	0	40
2016	PHI TB	10	16	103	6.4	1	17	4	15	3.8	10	0	0	0	13	324	1	0	98T
Career		33	44	425	9.7	4	44	5	22	4.4	10	0	1	1	37	963	2	0	107
