= MacArthur High School (Harris County, Texas) =

School in Houston, Texas, United States

Douglas MacArthur High School
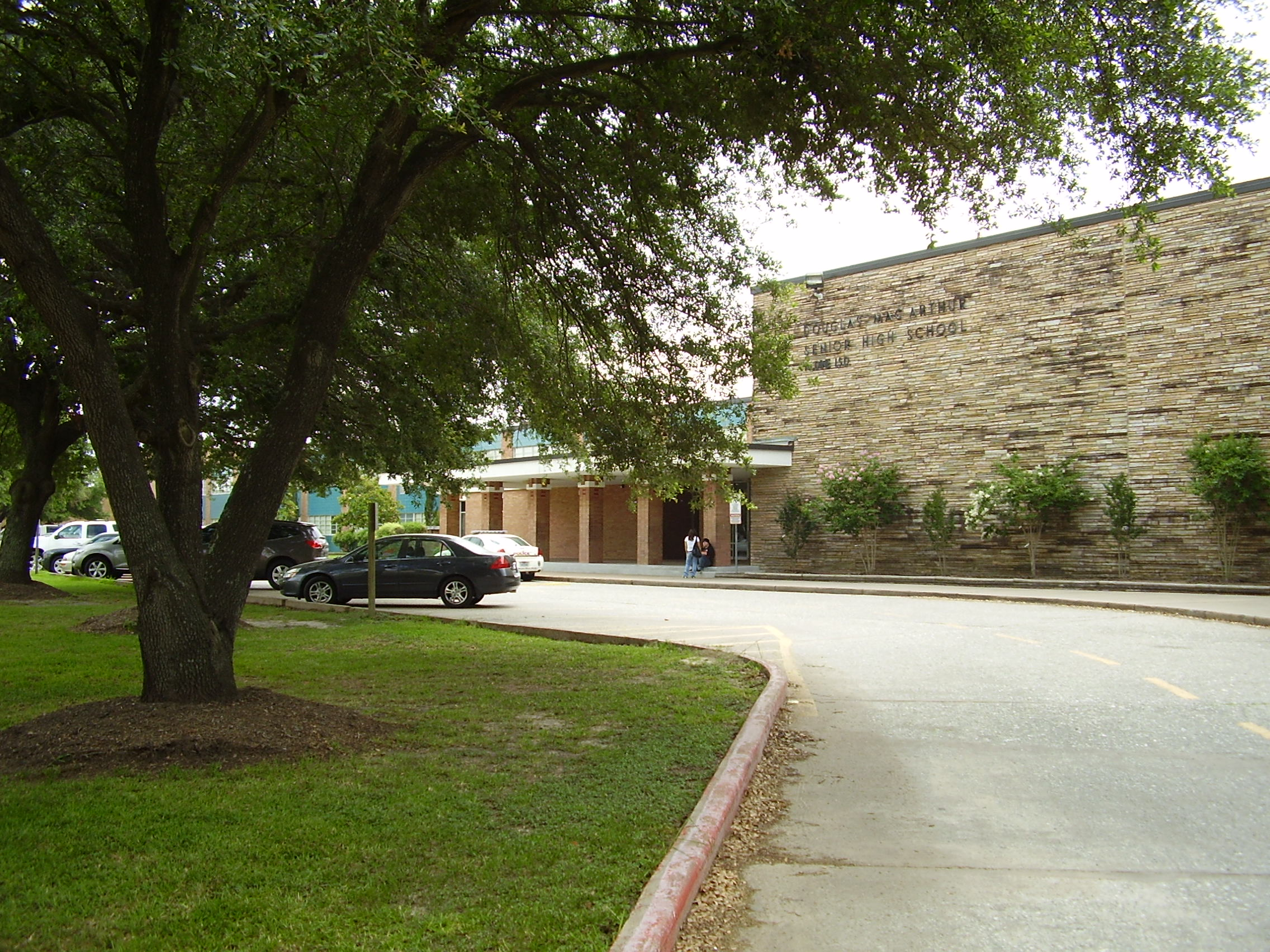

Location
- 4400 Aldine Mail Rt. Houston, TX 77093; 29.9015°N 95.3288°W

Information
- Established: 1965
- School district: Aldine Independent School District
- Principal: Shauna Showers
- Teaching staff: 197.86 (FTE)
- Grades: 9-12
- Enrollment: 3,573 (2023–2024)
- Student to teacher ratio: 18.06
- Colors: Silver, red, and white
- Team name: Generals
- Rival: Aldine High School
- Website: macarthurhs.aldineisd.org

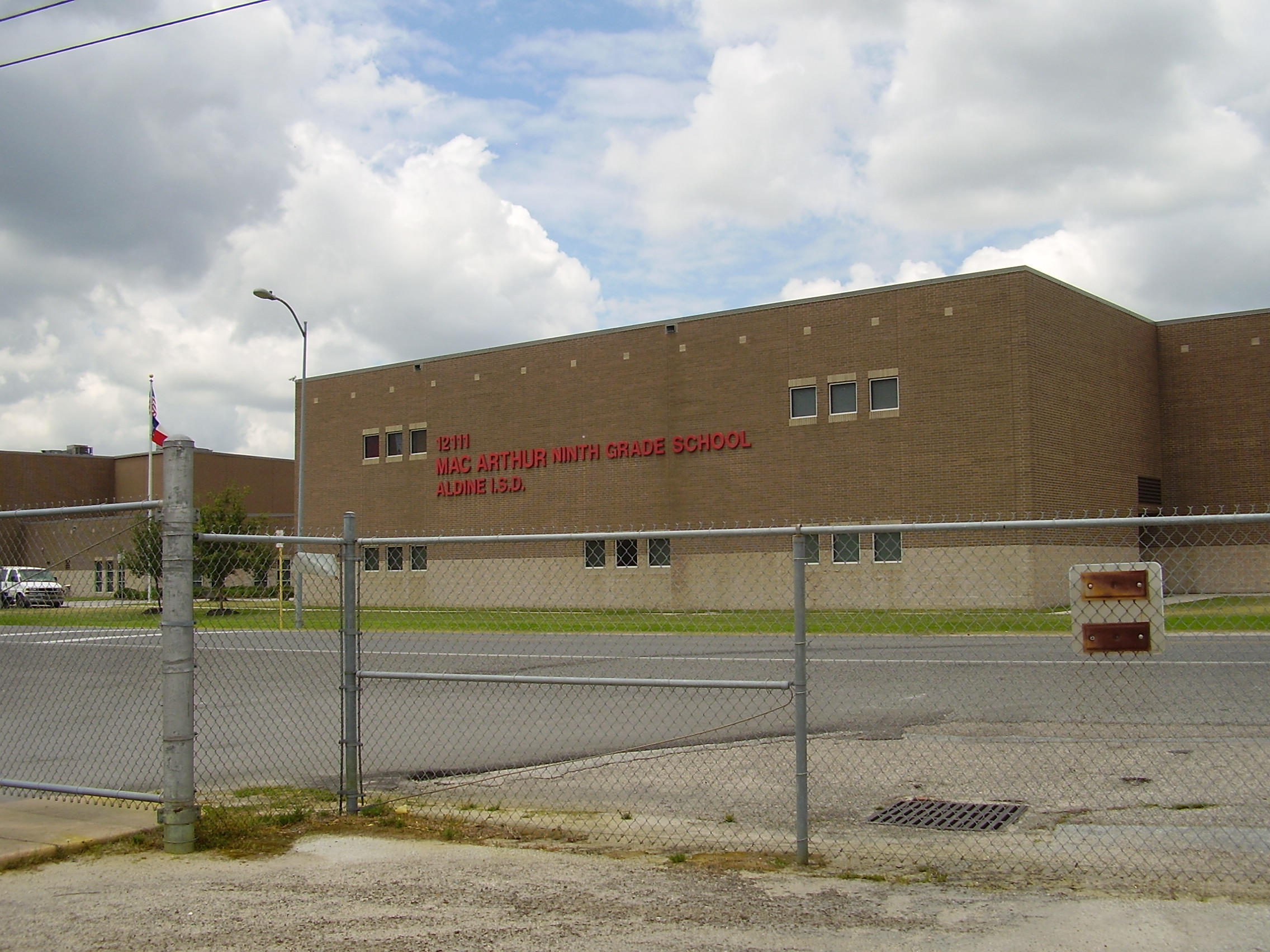
MacArthur 9th Grade School

MacArthur High School, located at 4400 Aldine Mail Route in East Aldine, unincorporated Harris County, Texas, United States, north of Houston, with a ZIP code of 77039. The school is named in honor of Douglas MacArthur.

The school serves sections of the unincorporated area of Aldine.

== History ==
MacArthur High School opened in 1965 and is the third high school in the Aldine Independent School District. The main campus (commonly referred by its students as "big mac") serves grades 10 through 12, while MacArthur Ninth Grade Center (commonly referred by its students as "little mac") serves grade 9.

MacArthur has numerous programs available to students. Among those programs are Tech-Prep, Advanced Placement classes, National Honors Society, and JROTC. In conjugation with a partnership with Lonestar College, it also offers opportunities for students in Health Science, Tech-Prep, Emergency Medical, and dual credit courses to continue their education at the college level while still in high school.

MacArthur’s award-winning jazz band has gained national recognition, as have participants in National History Day, Career and Technology, and chess. MacArthur students have also earned state honors in speech and debate, choir, dance, band and cross-country state and national champions in 1991.

== Academics ==
For the 2018-2019 school year, the school received a C grade from the Texas Education Agency, with an overall score of 79 out of 100. The school received a C grade in two domains, Student Achievement (score of 73) and Closing the Gaps (score of 71), and a B grade in School Progress (score of 82). The school received one of the seven possible distinction designations for Academic Achievement in Mathematics.

== Demographics ==
In the 2018-2019 school year, there were 2,826 students. 5.8% were African American, 0.1% were Asian, 92.3% were Hispanic, 0.1% were American Indian, 1.5% were White, and 0.2% were two or more races. 87.4% of students were Economically Disadvantaged, 18.5% were English Language Learners, and 7.7% received Special Education services.

== Feeder pattern ==
Hambrick Middle School	Grantham Academy	Aldine Middle School (partial)	Mead Middle School
Orange Grove Elementary	Raymond Academy	Oleson Elementary	Oleson Elementary
Oleson Elementary	Stephens Elementary	Raymond Academy	Reed Elementary
Johnson Elementary	Worsham Elementary	Francis Elementary	Stephens Elementary
Escamilla Elementary	Reed Elementary	Reed Elementary	Raymond Academy

== Notable alumni ==
- Alberto Gonzales, former U.S. Attorney General
- Debra Hobbs (Class of 1973), Republican member for the Arkansas House of Representatives from Rogers; candidate for Lieutenant Governor of Arkansas in 2014
- Tony Hutson (Class of 1991), former NFL player
- Paul Mills (Class of 1990), college basketball coach
- Jose Portilla, former NFL player
- Brian Bevil, former MLB player
