= Halls Bayou =

Coordinates: 29°50′17″N 95°14′03″W

Halls Bayou is a bayou in the northern part of Houston, Texas. It begins just north of W Mt Houston Road and flows for 17 miles (27 km). It empties into Greens Bayou in Brock Park and Golf Course. Originally known as the “south fork of Greens Bayou,” it was renamed in the 1880s for Clinton Hall, who owned land along the bayou and whose family still occupies areas near the bayou and Santa Fe, Texas.

This bayou is host to tens of thousands of waterfowl due to the availability of wild celery. Fish commonly found in the bayou include largemouth bass, catfish, red drum, speckled trout, and croaker.

== See also ==
- List of rivers of Texas
