= 99 Ranch Market =

Taiwanese-American supermarket chain

- Native name: 大華超級市場
- Type: Private
- Industry: Retail
- Founded: 1984; 42 years ago as 99 Price Market in Westminster, California
- Founder: Roger H. Chen
- Headquarters: Buena Park, California
- Number of locations: 69
- Area served: California, Oregon, Washington, Nevada, Texas, New York, New Jersey, Massachusetts, Maryland, Arizona, and Virginia
- Products: Bakery, dairy, deli, frozen foods, grocery, meat, produce, seafood, snacks, liquor
- Parent: Tawa Supermarket Inc.
- Website: 99ranch.com

99 Ranch Market

Chinese name
- Traditional Chinese: 大華超級市場
- Simplified Chinese: 大华超级市场
- Literal meaning: Great Chinese Supermarket
Transcriptions
Standard Mandarin
- Hanyu Pinyin: Dàhuá Chāojíshìchǎng
Yue: Cantonese
- Jyutping: daai6 waa4 ciu1 kap7 si3 ceong4
Southern Min
- Hokkien POJ: Tāi-huâ-chhiau-kip-chhī-tiûⁿ

Vietnamese name
- Vietnamese: Siêu Thị 99 Ranch

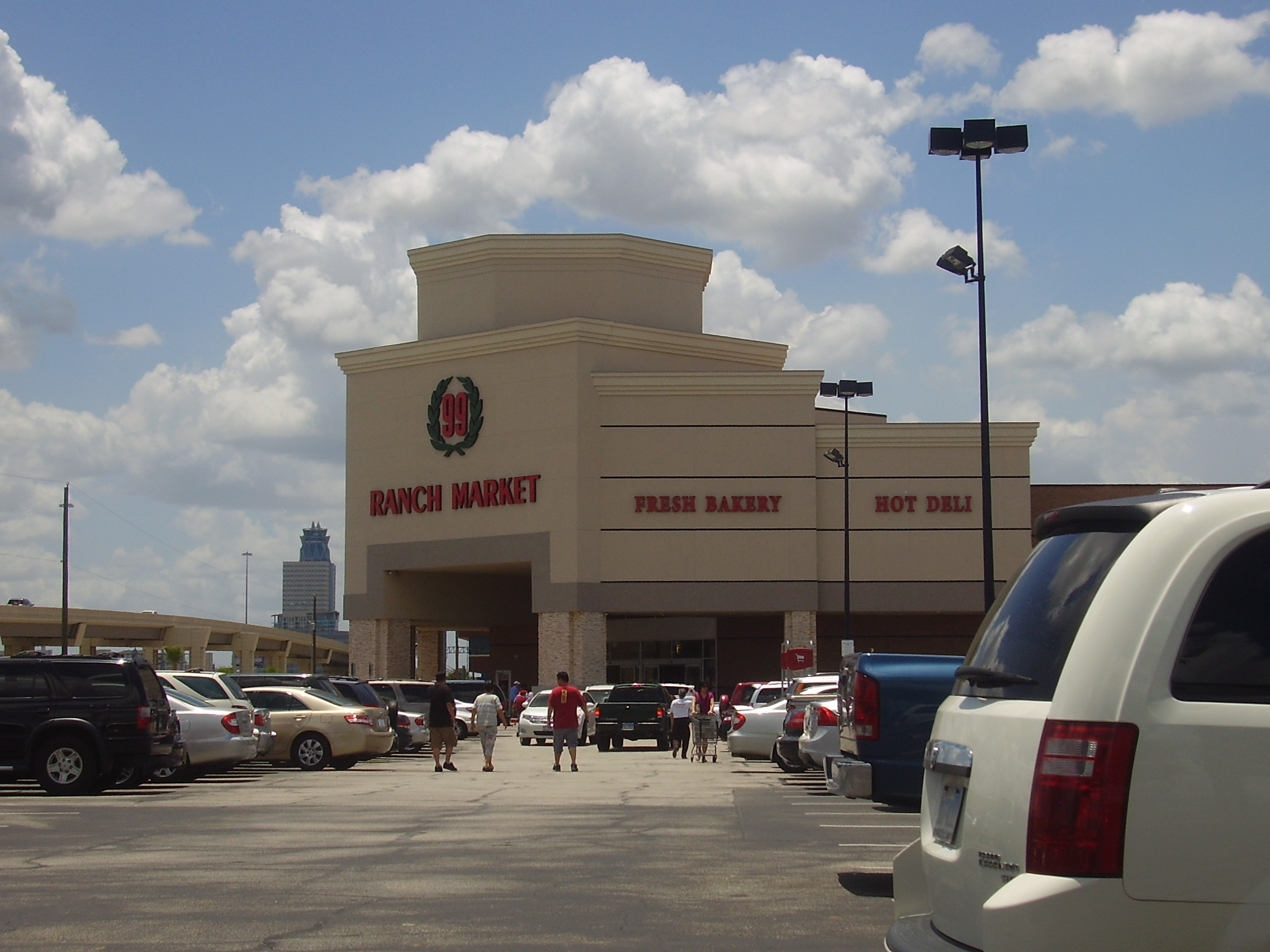
99 Ranch Market in Spring Branch, Houston (2011)

99 Ranch Market (traditional Chinese: 大華超級市場; simplified Chinese: 大华超级市场) is an American supermarket chain owned by Tawa Supermarket Inc., which is based in Buena Park, California. 99 Ranch has 58 stores in the U.S. (as of April 2023), primarily in California, with other stores in Nevada, Oregon, Washington, New Jersey, New York, Texas, Maryland, Massachusetts, Arizona, and Virginia. The company also started offering shopping via its website in 2014. In February 2021, the company also launched their mobile app for grocery delivery. One of its main competitors is H Mart.

Founded in 1984 by Taiwanese immigrant Roger H. Chen, 99 Ranch Market has grown into the largest Asian supermarket chain in the United States.

The parent company Tawa Supermarket Inc. also owns 168 Market, a smaller Taiwanese-American supermarket chain which has six stores in California and Nevada.

== History ==
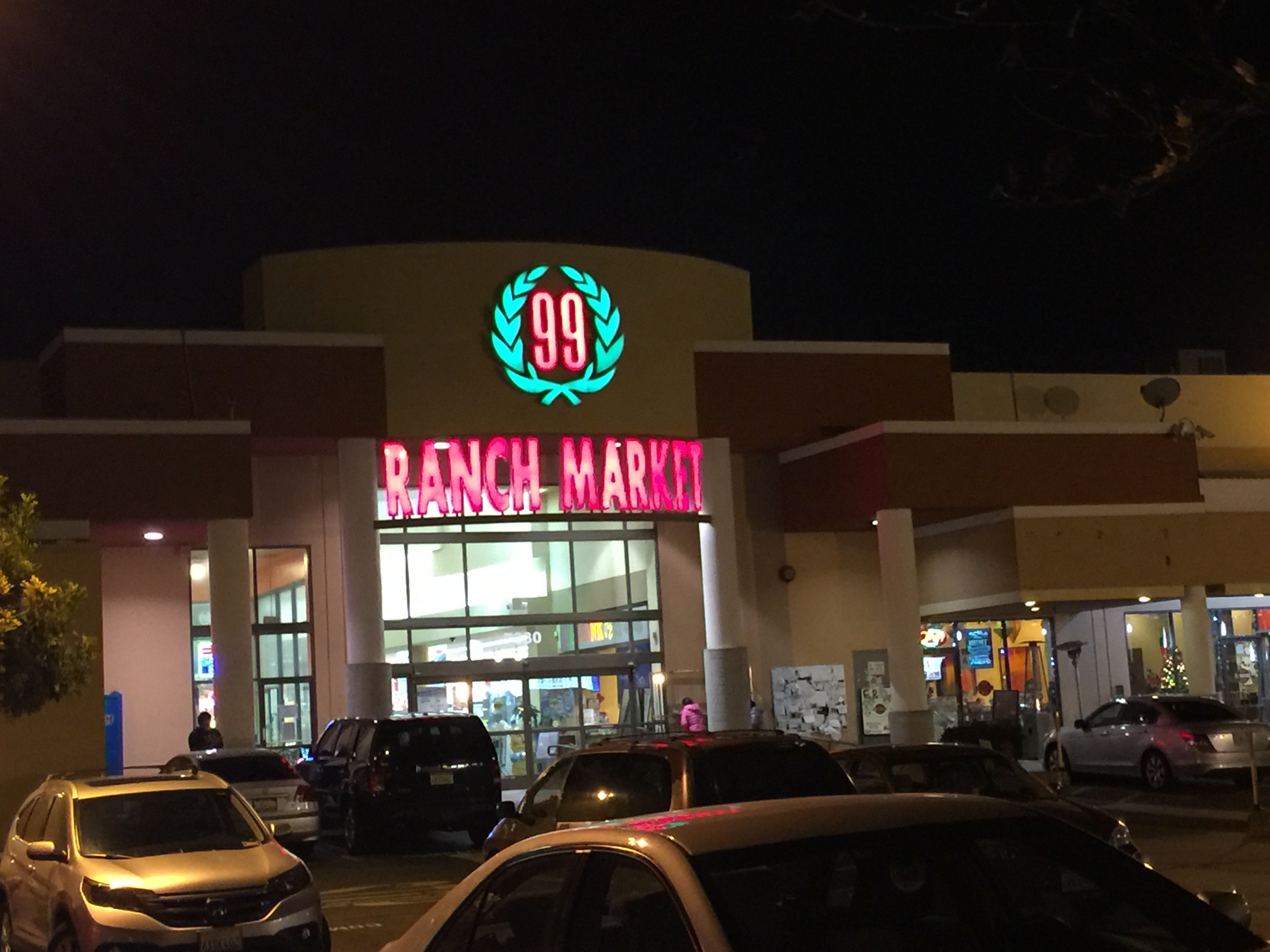
99 Ranch Market in Kearny Mesa, San Diego (2015)

Roger Chen, a Taiwanese-born American, opened the chain's first location in 1984 in Little Saigon, a Vietnamese American community located in Westminster, California (now closed). In 1987, a second market was opened in Montebello on 2809 Via Campo (closed in 1997 or 1998). It was originally called 99 Price Market but was eventually renamed 99 Ranch Market to give the supermarket a somewhat more attractive name. A third location using the first 99 Ranch Market official name was opened at Rowland Heights in 1989, which is still open today.

Prior to 1998, all stores that were opened outside of California were done through franchises, with the exception for a single store in Nevada, all of these franchises had either failed (Hawaii and Georgia), became independent (Indonesia), or both (Arizona).

In their first expansion outside of California, company owned stores were opened in the Seattle area at the Great Wall Shopping Center in 1998 and a second store at the Edmonds Shopping Center in 2003.

Over the years, 99 Ranch Market has developed into the largest Chinese supermarket chain, with its own production facilities, including farms and processing factories. The chain is currently headquartered in Buena Park, California.

In addition to its American stores, it maintains its own production facilities in China and these company-owned plants have implemented quality control measures to ensure that products from China are compliant with Food and Drug Administration standards and regulations.

A franchise store was established in Atlanta at the Asian Square in 1993. This store was unable to compete with more recently opened East Coast based chains like Super H Mart and closed in 2010.

In 1993, the parent of the 99 Ranch Asian supermarket chain, Tawa Supermarkets, created a Chinese-Canadian supermarket chain called T&T Supermarket (大統華) as a joint venture with Uni-President Enterprises Corporation of Taiwan and a group of Canadian investors headed by President and CEO Cindy Lee. T&T initially started stores in the Vancouver area, and then expanded throughout Canada and into Edmonton, Calgary and Toronto. Tawa and partners sold the T&T Supermarket chain to Loblaw Companies in 2009 for $225 million.

In 1995, the first 99 Ranch Market location in the state of Nevada was opened by a franchise that was owned by Chen's nephew Jason Chen as the anchor for the new Chinatown Plaza development in Las Vegas. A second Las Vegas area location was opened two decades later in October 2015.

In Phoenix, a franchise store was established by E&E Supermarkets in 1997 at the Chinese Cultural Center. However, E&E Supermarkets filed for bankruptcy in 1999 and the store was eventually closed. 99 Ranch Market reentered the Phoenix market in May 2021 by opening a store in Chandler, Arizona.

Another franchise store in Honolulu was established by Sunrise USA, Inc. in 1998 at the Moanalua Ethnic Village. This store was closed in 2007.

In 1997, PT Supra Boga Lestari established a franchise in Jakarta, Indonesia. After the May 1998 riots, PT Supra Boga Lestari decided it was best to break its ties with Tawa and become independent while using the similarly sounding "Ranch Market" and "Ranch 99 Market" names in Indonesia.

Expanding into Texas, two company owned stores were opened near Houston in 2008 and 2009 while a third store was opened in the Dallas–Fort Worth metroplex at Plano in 2010. A fourth Texas location opened up in Carrollton in March 2016 followed by a fifth location in Katy in August 2016. A sixth location in Austin, TX opened on March 3, 2018.

In 2006, the parent company Tawa Supermarket Inc. established a new Taiwanese-American supermarket chain, 168 Market, as a lower-cost alternative to 99 Ranch Market. The two chains share the same management team and owners. As of 2020, 168 Market has 5 stores in California and one in Nevada.

The company's first store location east of the Mississippi River was opened in Edison, New Jersey in January 2017 in a former Pathmark location. A second New Jersey location was opened in April 2017 in Jersey City. and also in Hackensack.

In August 2017, the company opened its first Oregon store in Beaverton.

In April 2018, the company opened its first store in the state of Maryland, in Gaithersburg.

In January 2020, the company opened its first Massachusetts store in Quincy.

In August 2020, the company opened its first store in the state of Virginia, in Fairfax.

In April 2022, the company opened its first store in the state of New York, in Westbury.

In July 2025, it was announced the company will open its first New York City location in Queens.

The company is set to open its first Illinois location in Naperville in 2026.

== Customer base ==
Although most of its customers are ethnic Chinese Americans, shoppers also include recent immigrants from China, ethnic Chinese from Vietnam, and others. The chain sells a wide range of imported food products and merchandise from mainland China, Hong Kong, Taiwan, Japan, Korea, and Southeast Asia (particularly Vietnam and Thailand). It also carries some domestic products made by Chinese American companies and a limited selection of mainstream American brands. In addition, it has also reached out to pan-Asian customers, especially Filipino Americans and Japanese Americans, by opening locations in areas predominantly populated by people of these two ethnicities.

Because 99 Ranch Market serves a predominantly Chinese American base, Mandarin Chinese serves as the lingua franca of the supermarket and its adjacent businesses. In-store PA announcements announcing specials are multilingual and often in Mandarin and Cantonese, less often in English.

The name of the chain includes "99," a number considered lucky by ethnic Chinese. The number nine in Chinese sounds like the word for "long-lasting."

The company's slogan is "For 100 we try harder," a play on the grocery's name. In earlier times, the company utilized an English slogan of "united at heart for a better future," with the Chinese slogan being "大華與您共創未來" (Dà Huá yǔ nín gòngchuàng wèilái - "99 Ranch is creating the future together with you"). As of 2017, the company has also described itself as "Your Favorite Destination For Asian Food Since 1984."

== General locations ==
Non-suburban locations tend to be located in multi-ethnic districts. For instance, the Van Nuys, California and Richmond, California stores are located in multi-cultural neighborhoods and are popular among African American, Mexican American, and European American customers, as well as Chinese-speaking customers.

In California, the chain has purportedly not been as popular in older Chinese communities. The 99 Ranch in Los Angeles' Chinatown operated in the Bamboo Plaza area for several years, but eventually the store was closed, perhaps due to its obscure location and lack of parking space, and perhaps due to competition from local small grocers, who have maintained their popularity among elderly Chinese American shoppers.

Setting up in suburban area, 99 Ranch Market is often the only Asian American supermarket and shopping center in the region. For instance, 99 Ranch Market is one of the few Asian supermarkets operating in the San Fernando Valley.

Given the market chain's premium locations, the costs of rent for tenants are generally high, but other Chinese businesses, such as Sam Woo Restaurants, Chinese traditional medicine shops, and gift stores, have been known to follow 99 Ranch Market to its new locations, with 99 Ranch market becoming the anchor tenant for the smaller stores and restaurants within developing Asian suburban shopping areas. For example, in Phoenix, Arizona, the state's first 99 Ranch Market opened as part of a larger Chinese Cultural Center that offered a number of Asian restaurants and shops for the city and surrounding areas.

Since 2008, 99 Ranch Market has opened locations in Texas, in particular Houston (2008), Sugar Land (2009), Plano (2010), Carrollton (2016), Katy (2016), Austin (2018), and Frisco (2019). This is in response to the growing population of Asian-Americans in Texas in the 2000s.

Most 99 Ranch Markets are company-owned. The only franchised locations remaining in the United States are those in Las Vegas. 99 Ranch Market is a popular American supermarket chain that is owned by Tawa Supermarkets Inc. and is based in Buena Park CA. As of April 2023 58 stores of 99 Grand Supermarkets are primarily based in California with other stores in Oregon, Nevada, New Jersey, Washington, Texas, Massachusetts, Maryland, Arizona and Virginia.

== Store layout and offerings ==
In design, 99 Ranch Market stores are similar to mainstream American supermarkets, with aisles that are wider and less cluttered than in most other Chinese markets. The supermarket accepts credit cards for totals above US$5.00 whereas many markets in old Chinatowns do not. Also, a scant handful of 99 Ranch Market locations have an in-store branch of East West Bank, a major Chinese American bank.

Most 99 Ranch Market locations have a full-service take-out deli serving a combination of Cantonese, Taiwanese, and Sichuan fare. Some of the delis in the markets also feature sushi, or pre-cooked meats, such as Cantonese roast duck and char siu. These stores also have a bakery with decorated cakes and fresh Chinese pastries; most of the bread products and pastries sold in the markets are no longer being made inside the store. The 99 Ranch locations that do not have delicatessens and/or bakeries simply operate as bare-bones markets.

99 Ranch Market used to operate a membership VIP card program and send out direct mail circulars with coupons. All of these programs and promotions were discontinued in August 2007, in favor of offering all customers the same price benefits. Although the chain remains successful and popular, prices are on average generally higher when compared to smaller non-chain Chinese groceries. In 2014, 99 Ranch Market re-launched a new point rewards program known as the Super Rewards Card, where customers gain 1 point for every pre-tax dollar spent. The chain also regularly runs sweepstakes giveaways, having worked with automakers such as Lexus, BMW, and Toyota.

The chain also runs major advertising campaigns, including in-print ads in Chinese-language newspapers such as World Journal and radio ads on Chinese-language radio in Southern California.

== Monikers ==
99 Ranch is sometimes referred to as "Ranch 99" because the 99 Ranch signs in California have the "99" part of the logo located between "Ranch" and "Market".

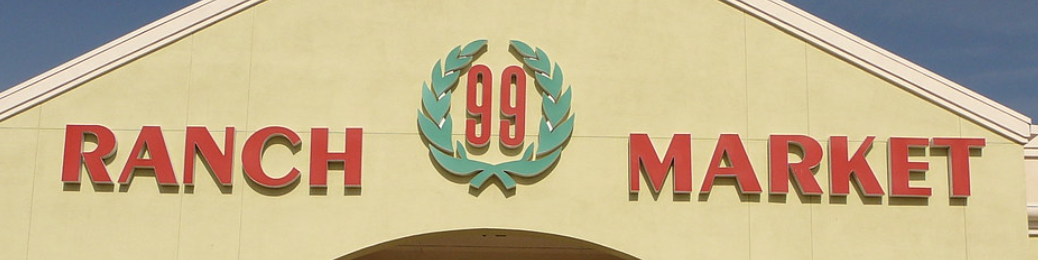
99 Ranch sign that appears to say "Ranch 99"

== See also ==
- H Mart
- Marukai Corporation U.S.A.
- Mega Mart
- Mitsuwa Marketplace
- Nijiya Market
- Kam Man Food
- T&T Supermarket
