= Nijiya Market =

Japanese-American supermarket chain

Nijiya Market ニジヤマーケット

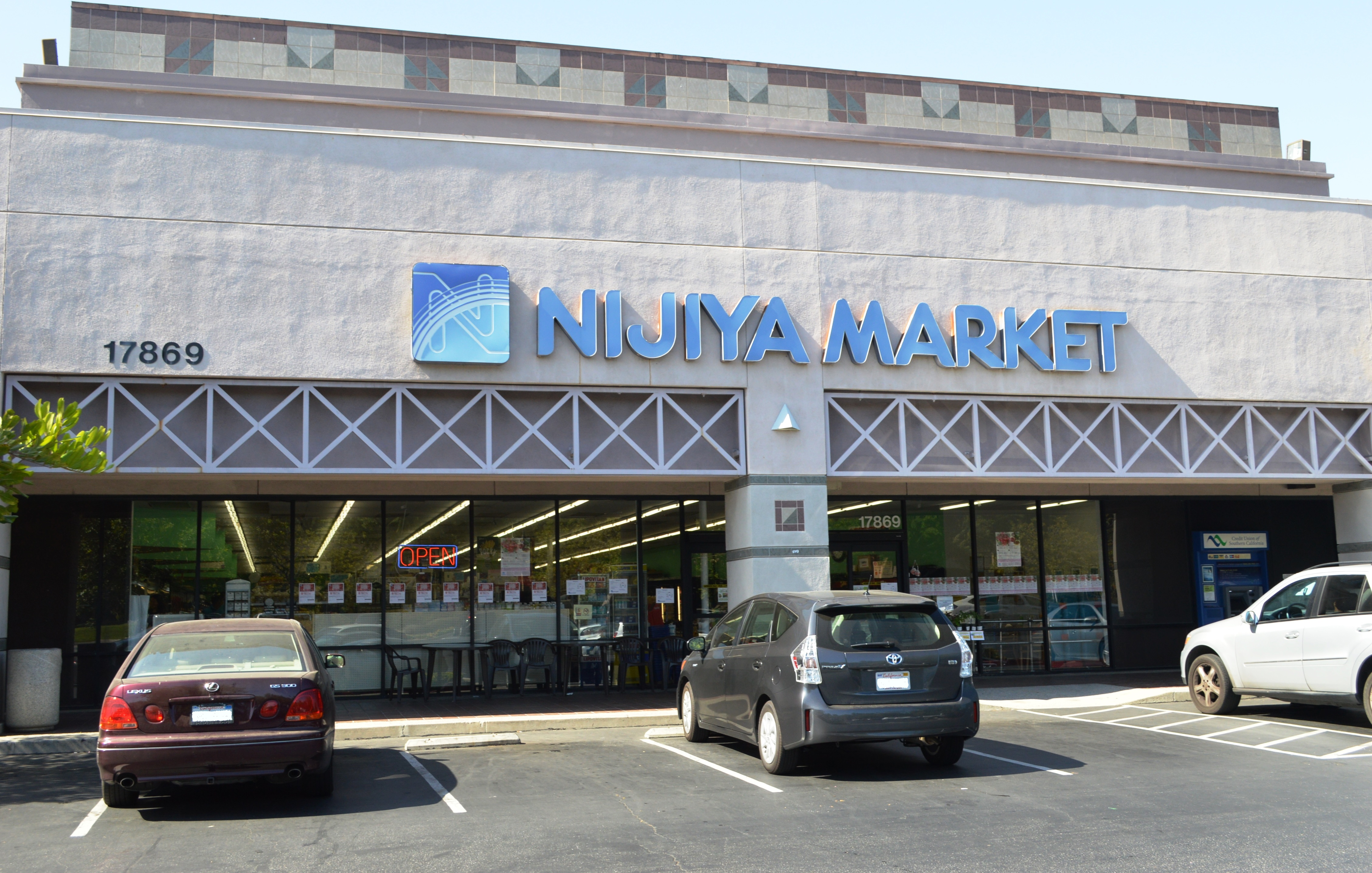
- Nijiya Market storefront in Puente Hills, California
- Type: Asian supermarket
- Industry: market
- Founded: 1986
- Founder: Saburomaru Tsujino
- Headquarters: Torrance, California
- Number of locations: 12
- Area served: California, Hawaii
- Products: Japanese cuisine
- Parent: Jinon Corporation
- Website: www.nijiya.com

Nijiya Market (Japanese: ニジヤマーケット, Hepburn: Nijiya Māketto) is an American chain of Japanese supermarkets headquartered in Torrance, California, with store locations in California and Hawaii. The store's rainbow logo is intended to represent a bridge between Japan and the United States.

== History and overview ==
Founded in 1986 by Japanese immigrant Saburomaru Tsujino, Nijiya Market opened its first store in San Diego, California's Kearny Mesa area. Since its inception, it has offered a large variety of Japanese food products. In addition, Nijiya sells organic vegetables grown on its own 100-acre organic farm in Rainbow, California, created an internship program, and established its own brand under which rice, dashi, miso and other Japanese food products are made.

Currently, Nijiya Market operates 12 stores in California and Hawaii. Among its locations are sites in San Francisco's Japantown, San Jose's Japantown, and Los Angeles' Little Tokyo. A Nijiya store that had operated in Hartsdale, New York closed in 2018.

== Gochiso Magazine ==
Nijiya Market publishes Gochiso Magazine (ごちそうマガジン), quarterly in Japanese and annually in English, which introduces Nijiya's products along with traditional Japanese recipes and articles covering the history of Japanese food culture. It is through Gochiso and its business operations that Nijiya participates in the practice of shokuiku.

== Gallery ==
Nijiya Market
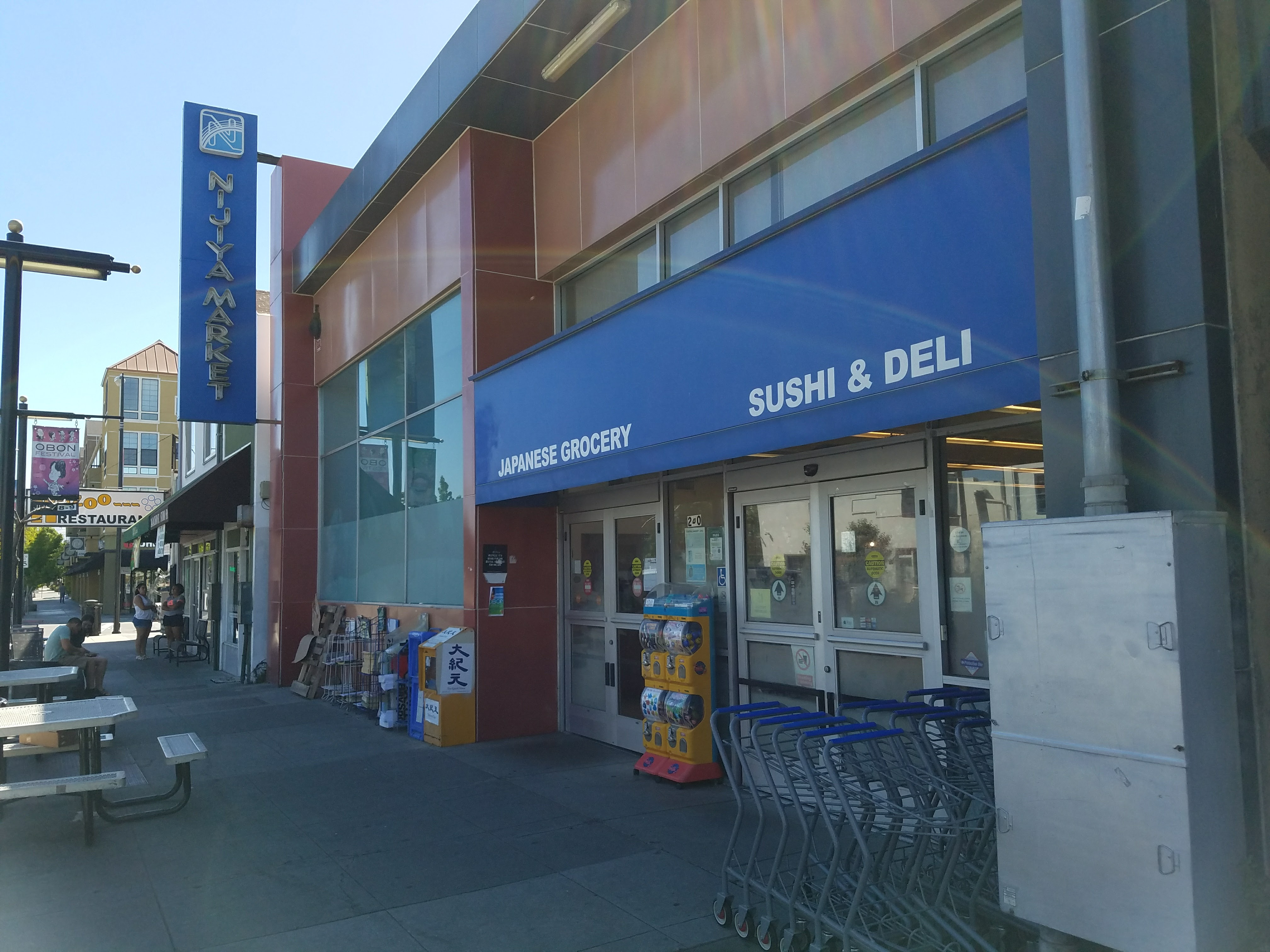
Nijiya Market in Japantown, San Jose

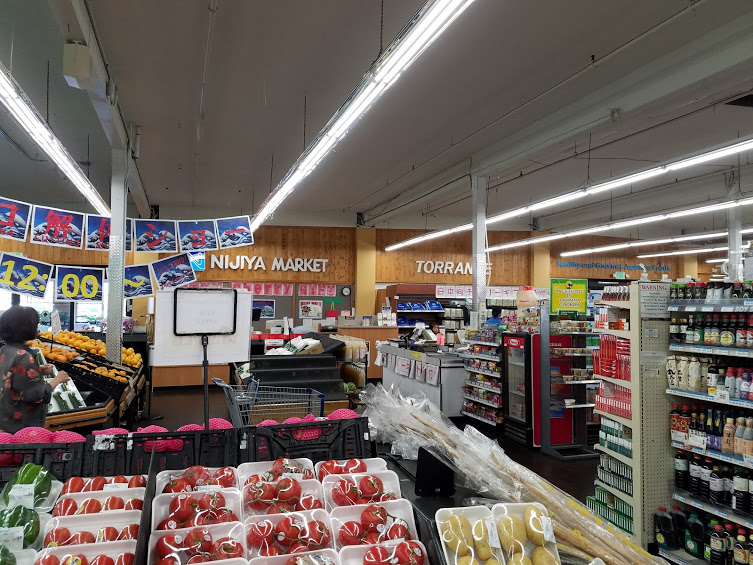
Front of the West 182nd Street Torrance store

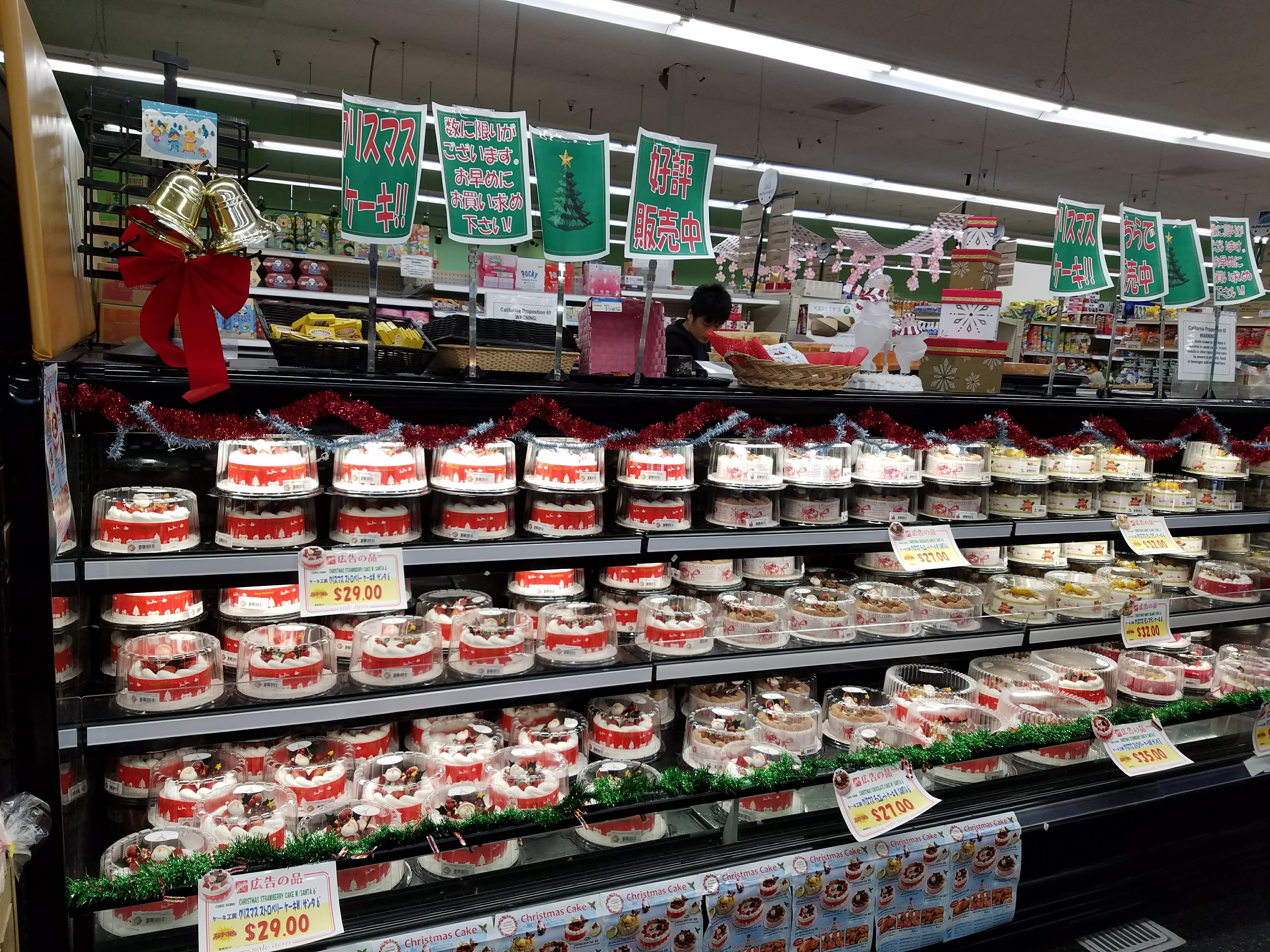
Christmas cake display in the San Diego store

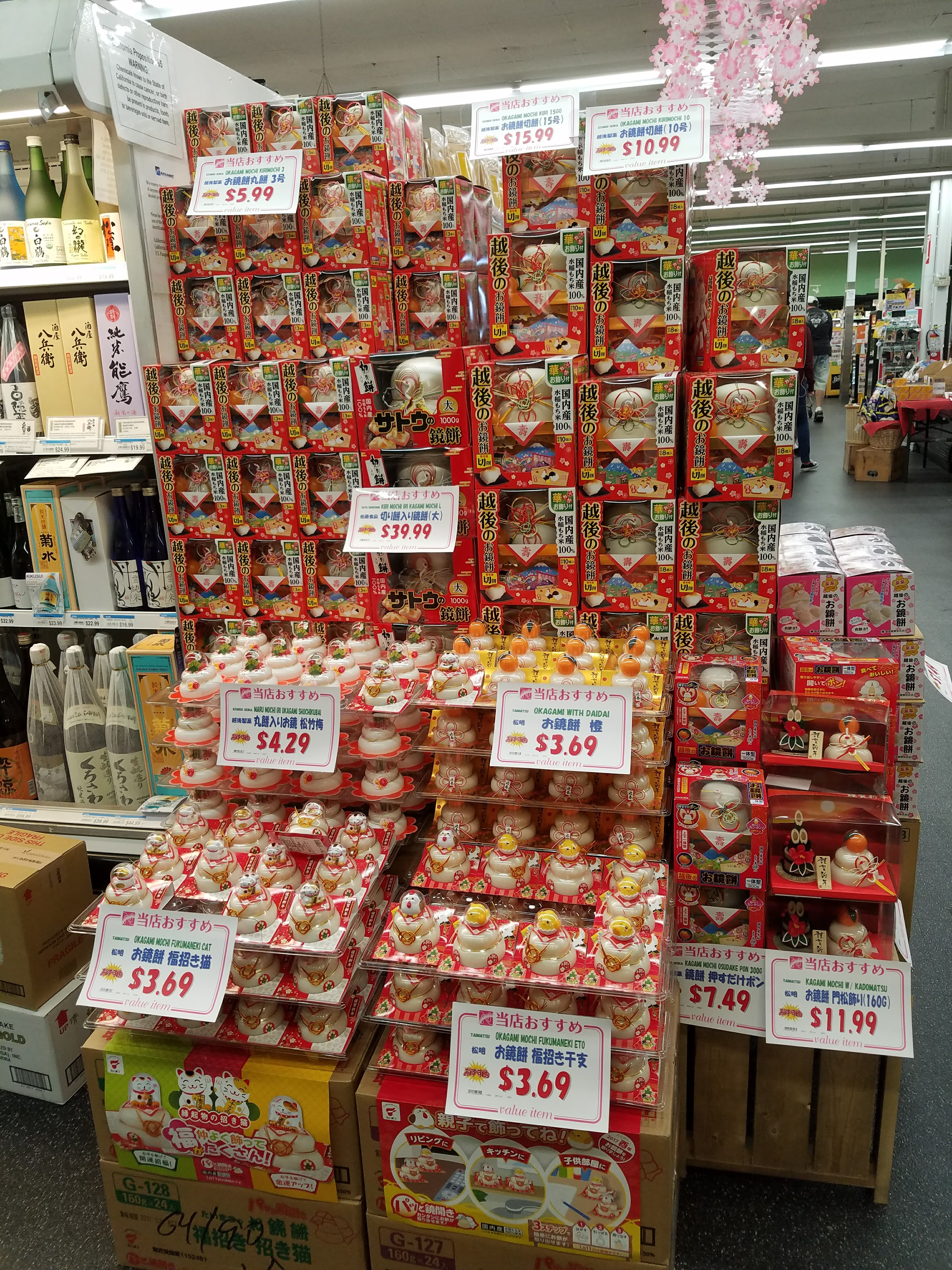
Kagami mochi display

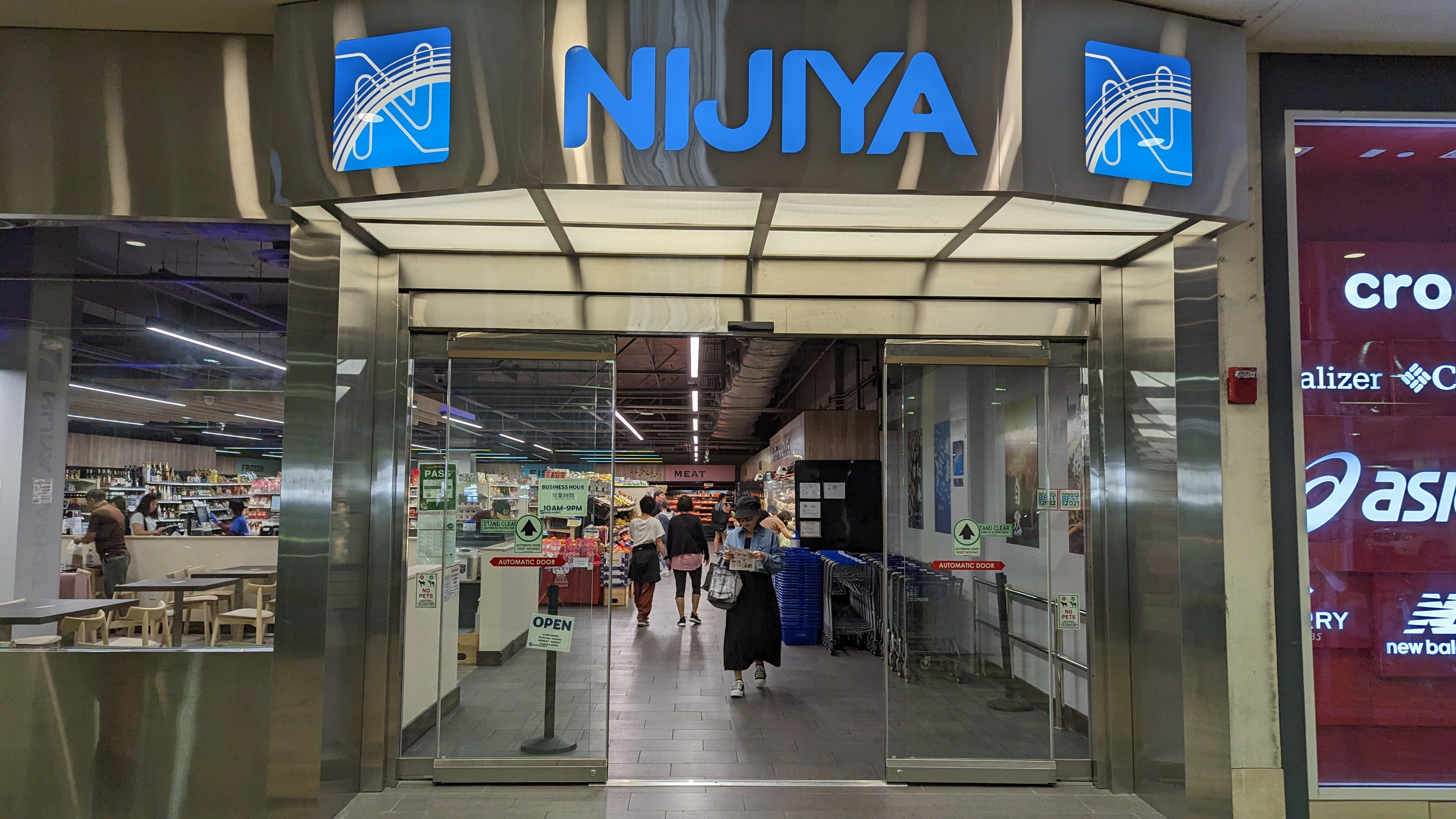
Ala Moana Center store entrance in Honolulu, Hawaii

== See also ==
- Mitsuwa Marketplace
- 99 Ranch Market
- H Mart
- Marukai Corporation U.S.A.
- Kam Man Food
- T&T Supermarket
