= Mitsuwa Marketplace =

American chain of Japanese supermarkets

Mitsuwa Corporation
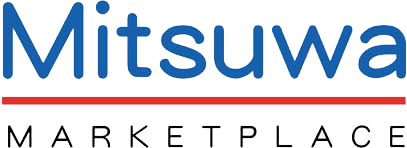

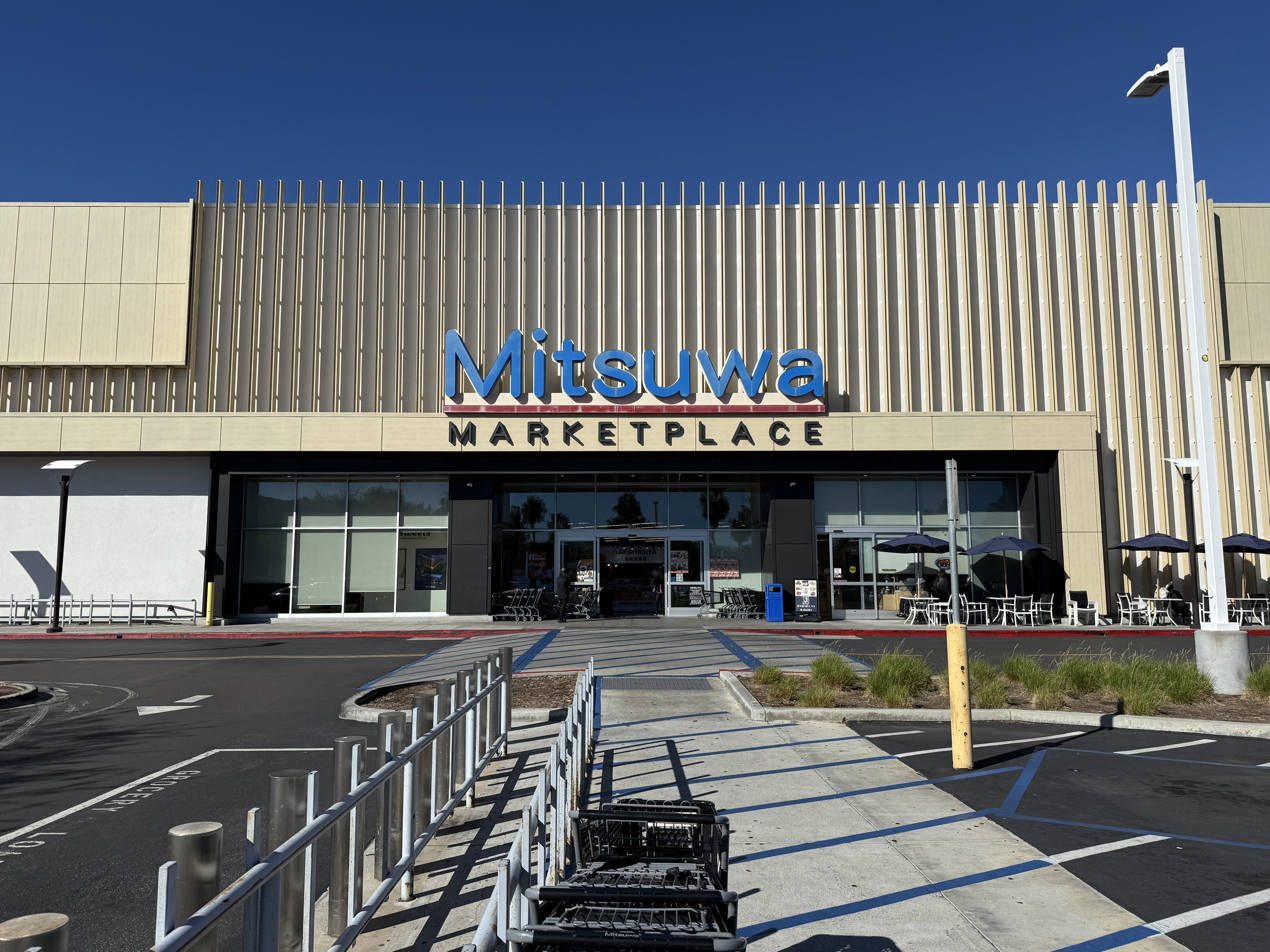
- Mitsuwa storefront in Torrance, California
- Type: Subsidiary
- Industry: Supermarket; Food court Retail
- Predecessor: Yaohan USA
- Founded: March 1998; 28 years ago in San Jose, California
- Headquarters: Torrance, California
- Number of locations: 13
- Area served: California; Hawaii; Illinois; New Jersey; Texas
- Key people: Takeshi Izuma (President, CEO)
- Products: Japanese cuisine
- Number of employees: 380 (as of January 1, 2023)
- Parent: Kamei Corporation
- Website: mitsuwa.com

Mitsuwa Corporation, doing business as Mitsuwa Marketplace (Japanese: ミツワマーケットプレイス, Hepburn: Mitsuwa Mākettopureisu) and commonly referred as Mitsuwa, is an American chain of Japanese supermarkets headquartered in Torrance, California. It was formed in March 1998 from Wanoba Group Inc.'s acquisition of Yaohan USA after the parent company, Yaohan, filed for bankruptcy. On December 21, 2012, the Kamei Corporation acquired Wanoba Group Inc.

Mitsuwa is one of the largest Japanese supermarket chains in the United States, operating 13 store locations in California, Hawaii, Illinois, New Jersey, and Texas. It features an extensive array of imported Japanese goods and products. In addition to their supermarket, most locations also offer food courts featuring mainly Japanese and other Asian cuisine. Some also host Japanese retail stores and services, such as Books Kinokuniya, Daiso, and Shiseido. Because of this, it is often referred as a mini-mall.

== Background ==
=== 1979-1997: Yaohan USA ===
Yaohan USA supermarket in Arlington Heights, Illinois

Under President Kazuo Wada's international expansion plans, Yaohan established subsidiary Yaohan USA by opening its first location in Fresno in 1979. Yaohan continued opening stores throughout California, such as Torrance and Costa Mesa.

In September 1988, Yaohan opened its first East Coast location in Edgewater, New Jersey. In September 1991, Yaohan expanded to Arlington Heights, Illinois, a suburb of Chicago. It opened as the largest Japanese supermarket in the American Midwest. Both locations planned on constructing hotels with a Japanese communal tub on the rooftop. The purpose of the projects was drawing in local communities from around the areas. However, for reasons unknown, the projects never came to fruition. In 1992, the Torrance store relocated to a larger space in the city's eastern edge to account for increased popularity amongst Japanese-Americans.

== History ==
=== 1997-2012: Wanoba Group Inc. acquisition and rebrand ===
In September 1997, Yaohan declared bankruptcy, citing the 1997 Asian financial crisis, stagnation of the Japanese retail market, and company debt of ¥171 billion, or $1.42 billion. In March 1998, Yaohan USA executives branched off to form a new company called Wanoba Group, Inc. and acquired the American locations. They used the assets to form a new subsidiary called Mitsuwa Corporation and rebranded the supermarkets as Mitsuwa Marketplace.

Throughout the 2000s, Mitsuwa continued operations. On January 25, 2009, the Los Angeles location in the Little Tokyo neighborhood closed due to Korean investors purchasing the property for $35 million. On December 17, 2011, Mitsuwa opened a new location in Irvine, California, their second supermarket in Orange County.

=== 2012-present: Kamei acquisition, U.S. expansion, and renovation ===
On December 21, 2012, the Kamei Corporation, a Japanese trading company, acquired Wanoba Group Inc. for $27.8 million with plans of retaining their management team and keeping business intact.

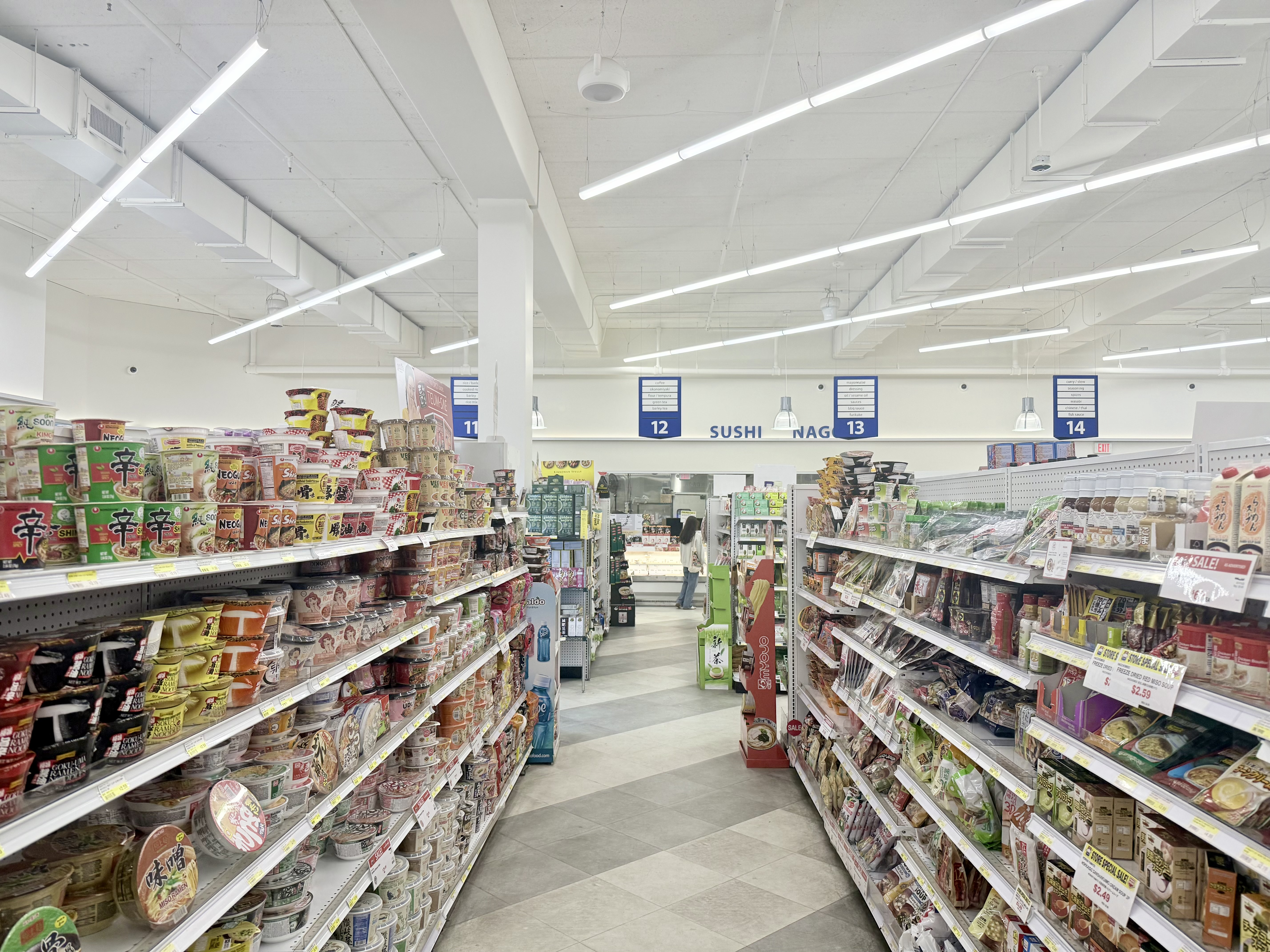
Inside the relocated Torrance location

In 2017, Mitsuwa expanded to two U.S. states outside of California. On April 14, 2017, they entered the Dallas-Fort Worth metroplex with a store in Plano, Texas, the biggest city in Collin County. It was chosen for their large Asian population and the recently relocated headquarters of Toyota Motor North America from Torrance, California. On May 15, 2017, Mitsuwa opened a new location in Waikīkī, Hawaii, at the International Market Place.

In 2019, Mitsuwa completed a major infrastructure renovation of the Chicago location with improved lighting, wider aisles, new walls, new flooring, and new restaurants to their food court. The company also announced it was relocating their Torrance location from Western Avenue to the Del Amo Fashion Center, debuting on February 12, 2020, with a modern, sleek look. The former building was demolished in 2023 for a new project.

On January 21, 2023, Mitsuwa opened a new supermarket in Northridge, California, near California State University, Northridge. It is one of only two stores in California that does not host a food court, the other being in San Gabriel. On August 22, 2023, Mitsuwa renovated Waikīkī's food court into a food hall called The Japan with six new vendors. On November 1, 2025, Mitsuwa opened a new location in Cypress, California, their third supermarket in Orange County.

== Products and offerings ==
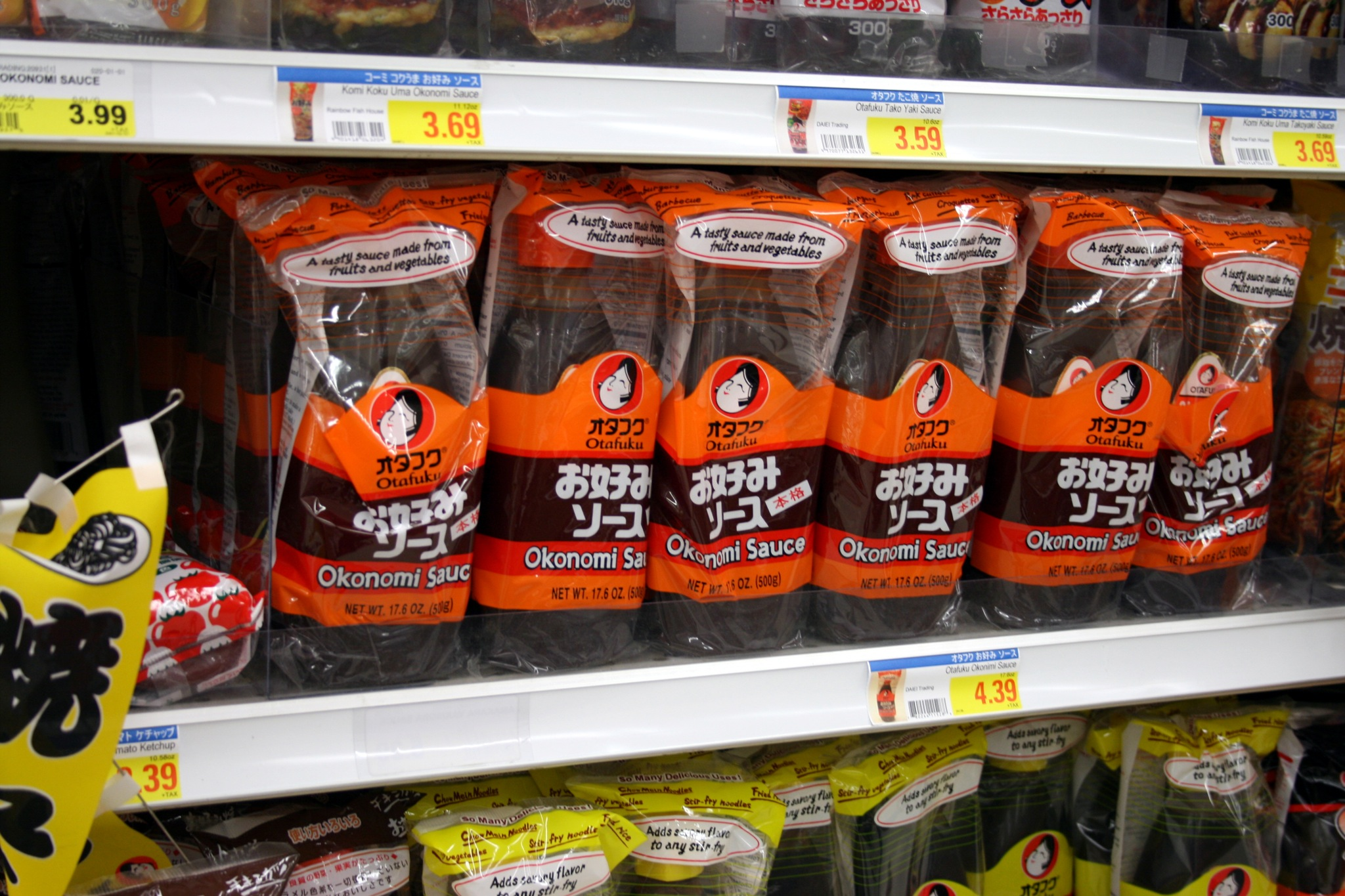
Okonomiyaki sauce for sale at Mitsuwa in Arlington Heights, Illinois

Mitsuwa offers a wide variety of imported Japanese products that are not often available in American grocery stores. The store carries a wide variety of ingredients essential in Japanese cuisine, popular snacks and drinks, and convenience food. Mitsuwa NAGOMI, the supermarket's sushi deli, sells a variety of pre-packaged sushi. For non-food items, Mitsuwa provides Japanese cosmetics, kitchenware, and toiletries.

Mitsuwa is best known for having food courts and specialty retail stores at most locations. The restaurants offer mostly Japanese and other Asian food. Some locations also offer Japanese specialty retail and services, with key stores such as Books Kinokuniya, Daiso, and Shiseido. Others also have stores with Bandai gashapon vending machines and One Piece Card Game products.

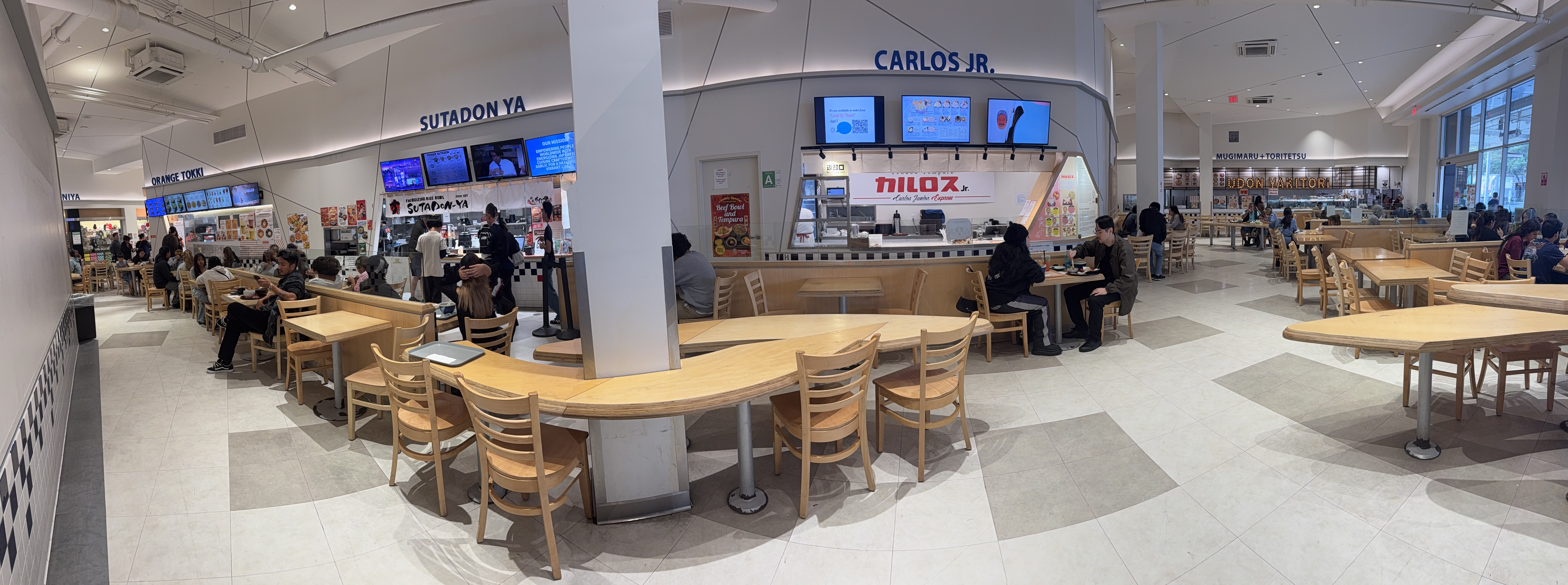
A panorama of Mitsuwa's food court in Torrance, California

== Festivals and fairs ==
At most locations, Mitsuwa hosts a calendar of festivals and fairs. Often, they are sales events to promote deals and discounts on goods using free samples, demonstrations, limited supply, and guest celebrities. The events have highlighted store brands, specific cuisine, foods from Japanese prefectures and regions, and anime.

The New Jersey location hosts an annual summer festival, or natsumatsuri, around August. The outdoor event showcases various entertainment filled with music or dance. These include bon odori, taiko, yosakoi, hula dancing, and local band performances. For food, local vendors sell a variety of savory and sweet food, such as takoyaki, okonomiyaki, and kakigōri. They also offer traditional games and activities, like yo-yo balloons, karaoke, and cosplay contests.

== Store locations ==
=== California ===
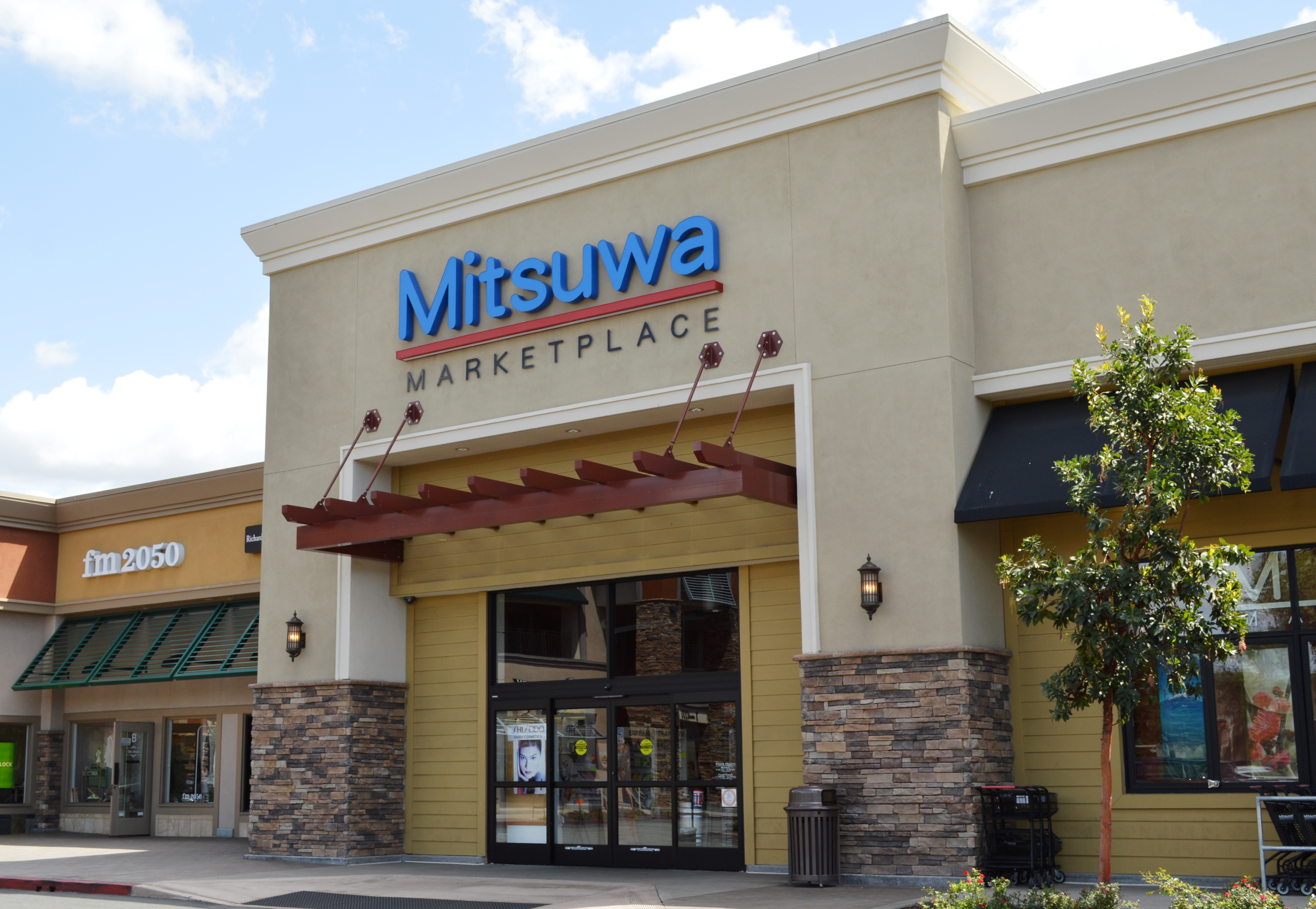
Mitsuwa Marketplace in Irvine, California

- Santa Clara County
  - San Jose
- Los Angeles County
  - Northridge
  - San Gabriel
  - Santa Monica
  - Torrance
- Orange County
  - Costa Mesa
  - Cypress
  - Irvine
- San Diego County
  - San Diego

Food Court
| Locations | Restaurants |
|---|---|
| San Jose | Hokkaido Ramen Santouka; J.sweets; Mitsuwa NAGOMI; Mochill Mochi Donut; Mochi-ya Ren; Niitakaya; Takoyaki Yamachan |
| Santa Monica | Hamada-Ya; Hokkaido Ramen Santouka; Sanuki Sandou Udon; Sutadonya; Tendon Hannosuke; Tokyo Shokudo |
| Torrance | Hamada Ya; Hokkaido Ramen Santouka; J.sweets; Mochill Mochi Donut; Mugimaru + Toritetsu; Orange Tokki; Sutadonya; Tendon Tempura Carlos Junior; Yamari |
| Costa Mesa | Don Don Tei; Gyutan Tsukasa; Hamada Ya; Hokkaido Ramen Santouka; J.sweets; Machi – chuuka by Eboshi; Matcha Ren; Miyabitei; New Japan Beer Co. Sanuki Seimen Mugimaru; Umacha |
| Cypress | Hokkaido Ramen Santouka; J.sweets; Omusubi Gonbei; Tokyo Shokudo; Yamari |
| Irvine | Hamada Ya; J.sweets; Misasa; Santouka |
| San Diego | Hokkaido Ramen Santouka; J Crepe & Cafe; J.sweets; Musashiya; Niitakaya |

Specialty Retail
| Locations | Stores |
|---|---|
| San Jose | Bandai Gashapon Official Shop; Bandai Hobby; Beauty M with Mini Takashima; Beauty Ocean; Books Kinokuniya; Megahouse Official Store; One Piece Card Game Official Shop; Royce'; Tamashii Nations |
| Santa Monica | Bandai Gashapon Official Shop; Hair Epoch; Shiseido |
| Torrance | Bandai Gashapon Official Shop; Books Kinokuniya; J.sweets; Royce'; Shiseido |
| Costa Mesa | Amnet; Bandai Gashapon Official Shop; Daiso Japan; Maido; Royce'; Shiseido |
| Irvine | Royce'; Shiseido |
| San Diego | Cool Japan Kyoto; One Piece Card Game Official Shop; Royce'; Trendy |

=== Hawaii ===
- Honolulu County
  - Waikīkī

The Japan Food Hall and Specialty Retail
| Restaurants | Stores |
|---|---|
| Carp Dori; Go! Go! Curry; Omusubi Fujimaru; Ramen Taiga; Tempura Endo; Uni Kura; Wagyu Cocoroe | Bandai Gashapon Official Shop |

=== Illinois ===
- Cook County
  - Arlington Heights

Food Court and Specialty Retail
| Restaurants | Stores |
|---|---|
| B-Bee Crepe & Boba; Hokkaido Ramen Santouka; J.sweets; Lady M Pastry House Hippo releaf Sanuki Seimen Mugimaru; Sutadonya; Tendon Tempura Carlos Junior; Tokyo Shokudo; Toritetsu | Bandai Gashapon Official Shop; Books Kinokuniya; One Piece Card Game Official Shop |

=== New Jersey ===
- Bergen County
  - Edgewater

Food Court and Specialty Retail
| Restaurants | Stores |
|---|---|
| Hokkaido Ramen Santouka; J.sweets; Lady M Kai Creamery; Kai Sweets; Kobe Fugetsudo; Minamoto Kitchoan; Mitsuwa NAGOMI; Mochimochi Kai Sweets; Niitakaya; Oishinbo; Omusubi Gonbei; Pastry House Hippo; Pullman Bakery & Shige Pan releaf Sanuki Seimen Mugimaru; Sutadonya; Tendon Hannosuke; Tokyo Hanten; Tsujita; Wateishoku Kaneda | Bandai Gashapon Official Shop; Books Kinokuniya; Daiso Japan; Little Japan USA; Maser Dental Group; Michi Beauty Salon; One Piece Card Game Official Shop; Royce'; Shiseido |

=== Texas ===
- Collin County
  - Plano

Food Court and Specialty Retail
| Restaurants | Stores |
|---|---|
| Good Times Donut; Kabukiya Ramen; Matsui; Mitsuwa NAGOMI; Totto Yama | Bandai Gashapon Official Shop; Books Kinokuniya; One Piece Card Game Official Shop |

== Gallery ==
Mitsuwa Marketplace
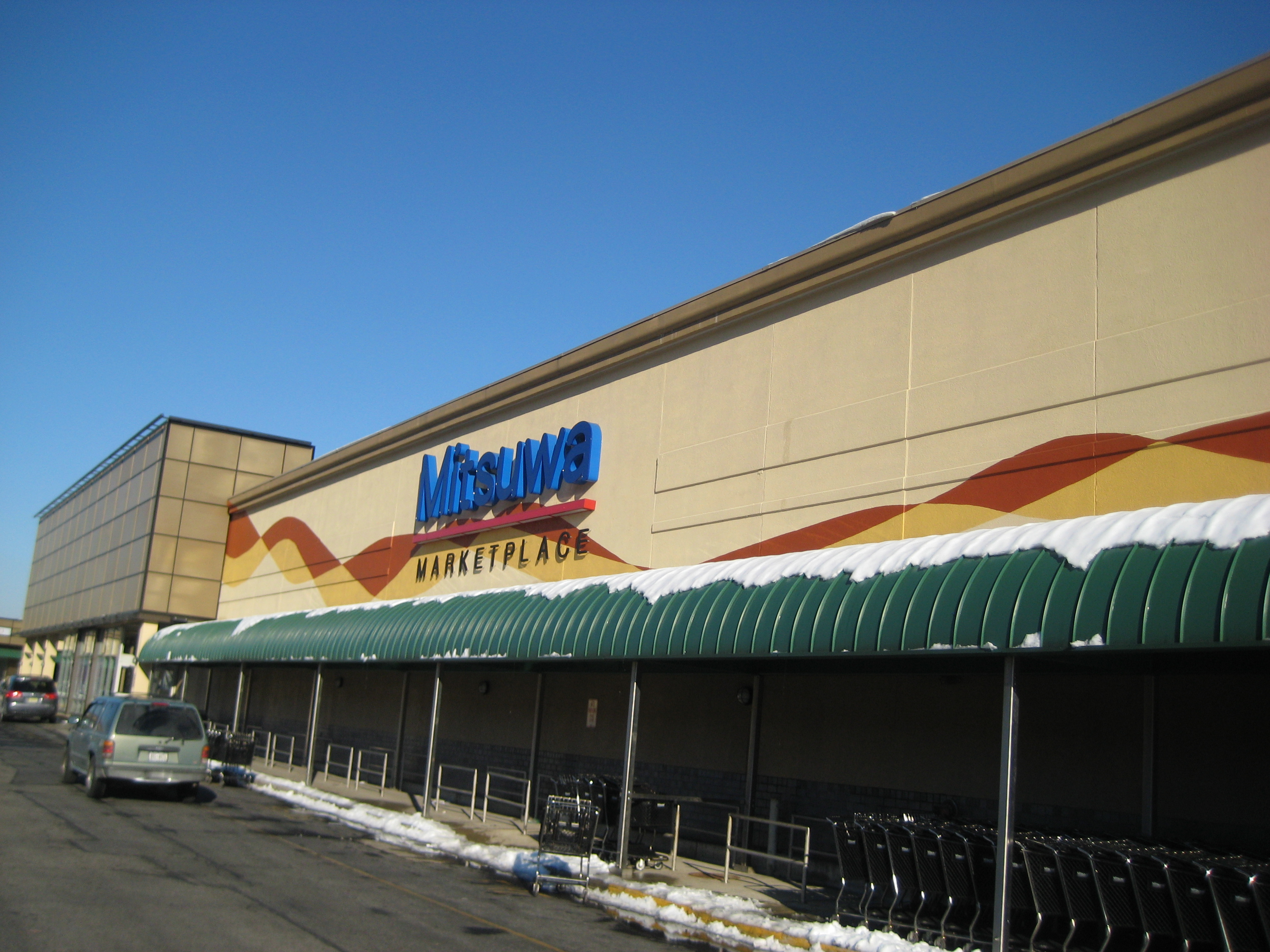
Mitsuwa Marketplace in Edgewater, New Jersey

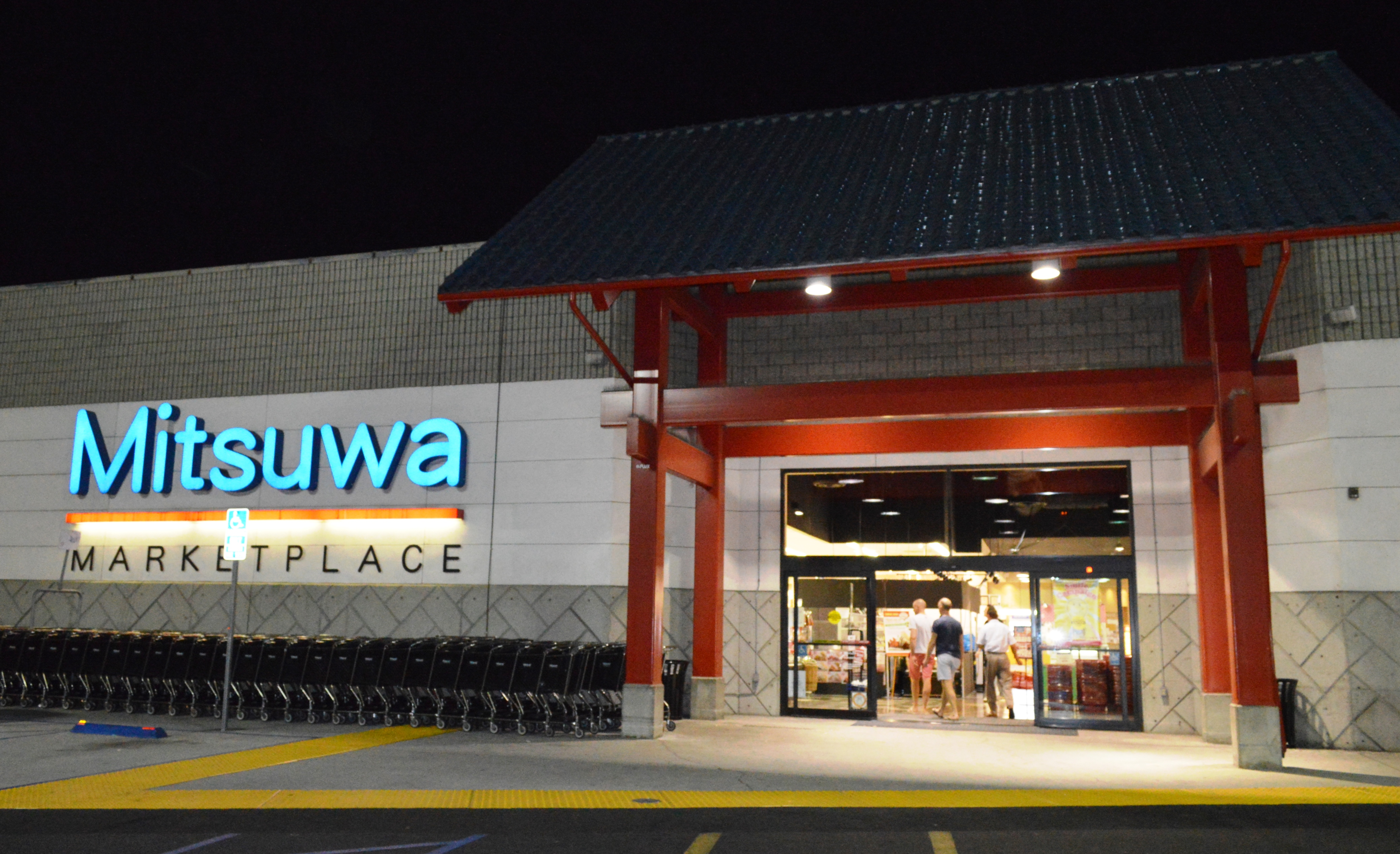
Mitsuwa Marketplace in Costa Mesa, California

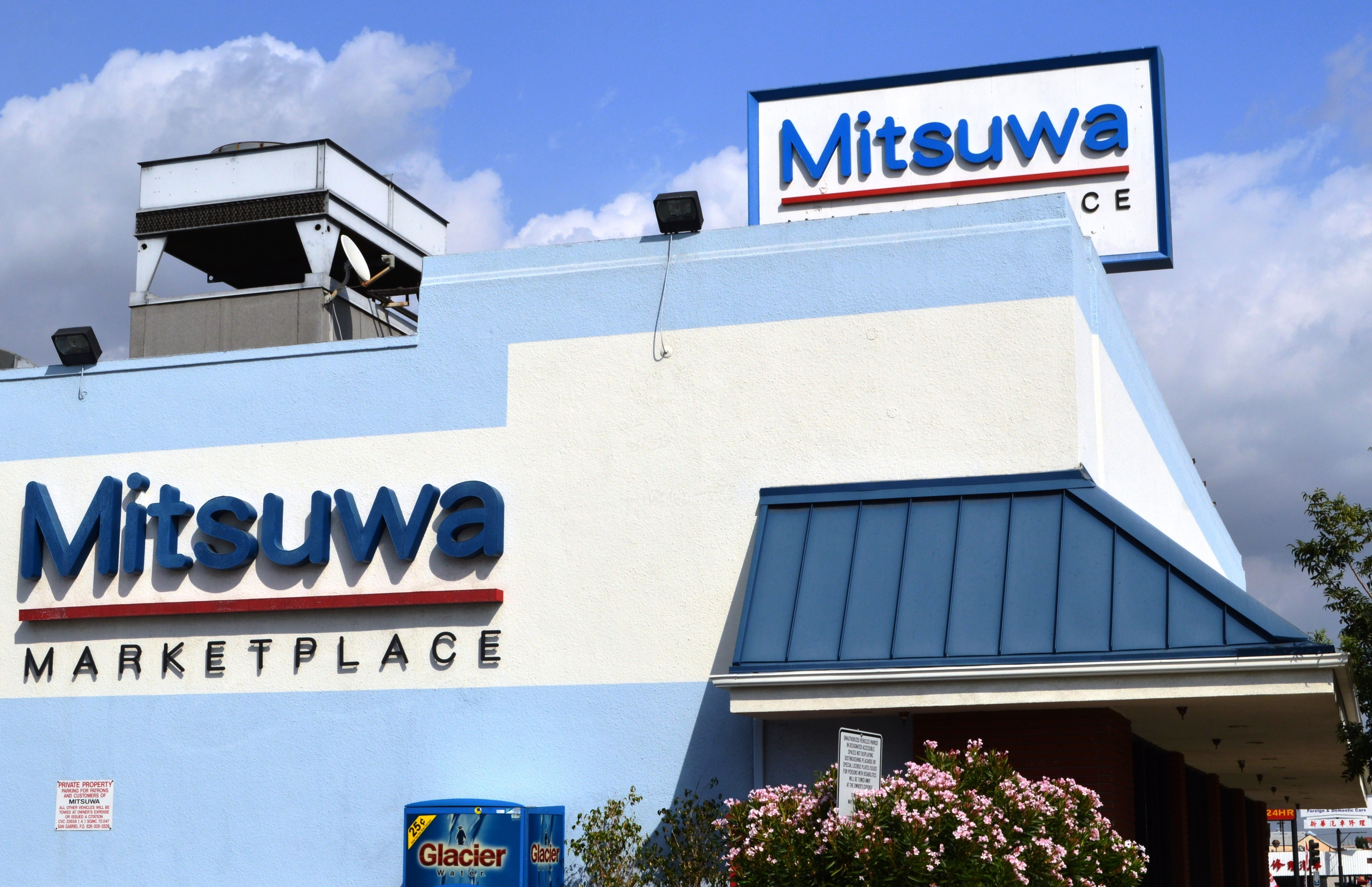
Mitsuwa Marketplace in San Gabriel, California

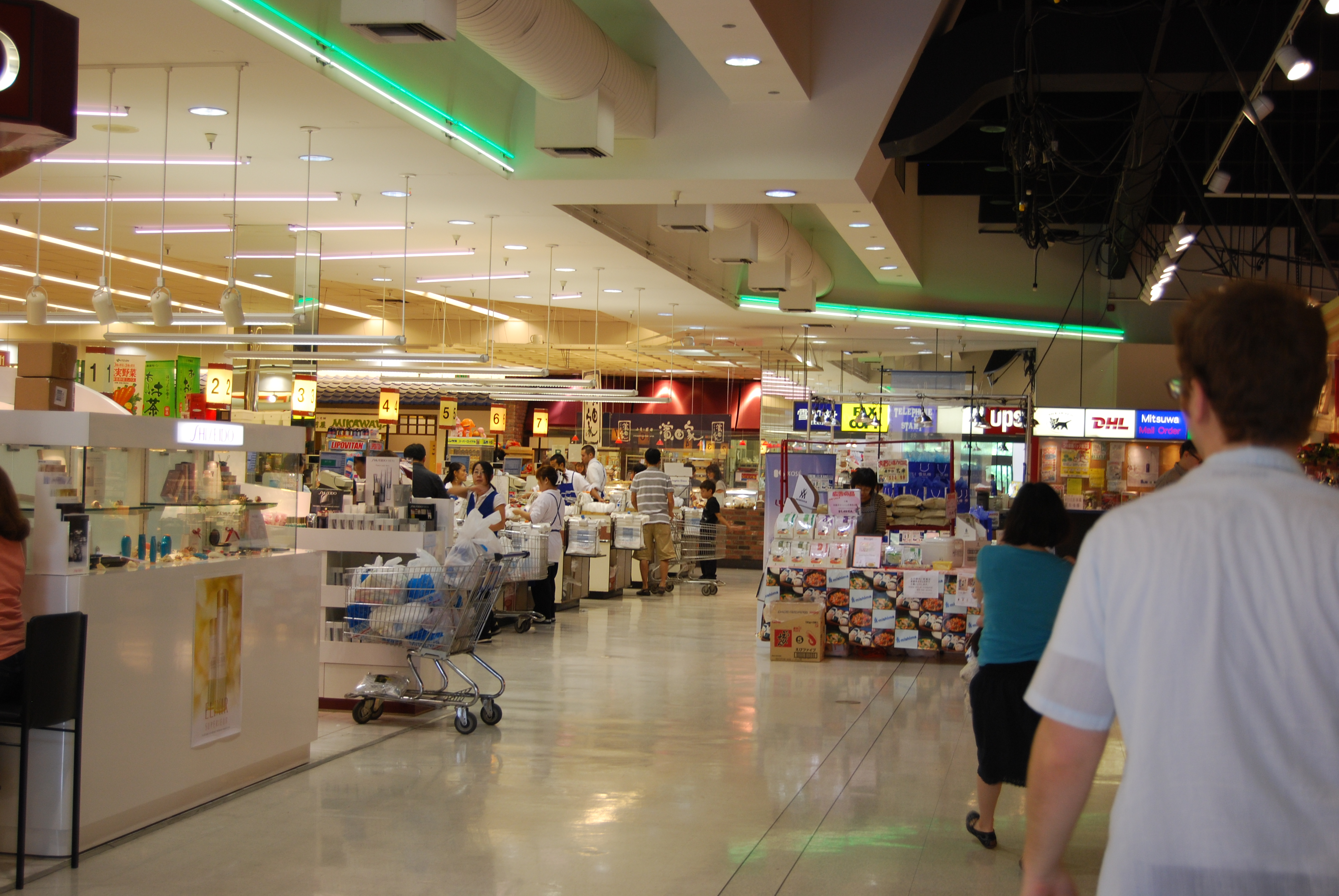
Inside the former Torrance location. The grocery store is to the left, the main food court upper right, and specialty stores selling books and videos lower right.

== See also ==
- 99 Ranch Market
- H Mart
- Kam Man Food
- Marukai Corporation U.S.A.
- Nijiya Market
- T&T Supermarket
