= Asian supermarket =

Type of grocery store found in Western countries

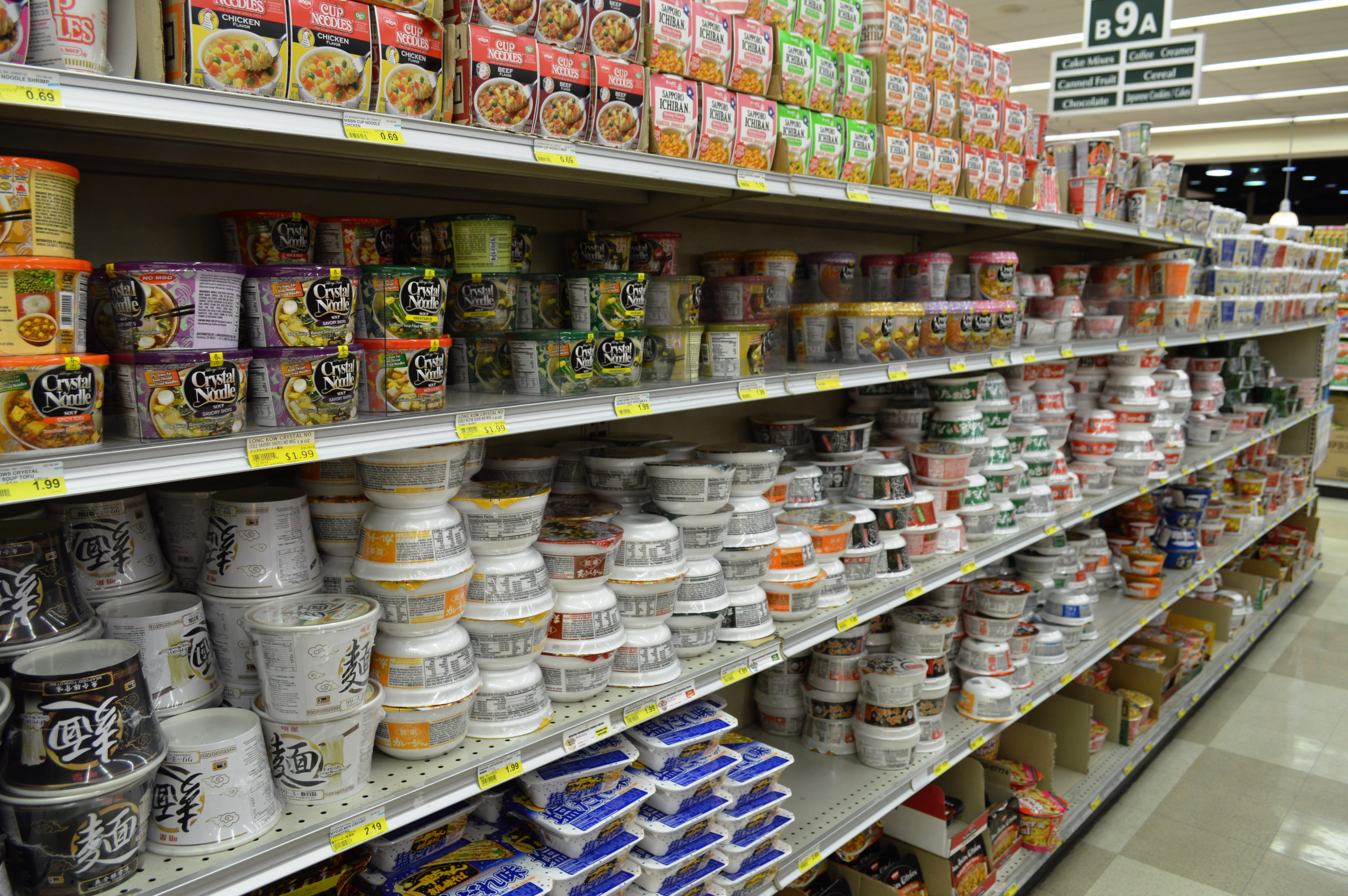
A selection of instant noodles in a Mitsuwa Marketplace store

In non-Asian countries, an Asian supermarket largely describes a category of grocery stores that focuses and stocks items and products imported from countries located in Asia.

Stores carry general merchandise, goods, and services related to specific Asian countries of origin, immigrant communities, or the ethnic enclave that the store may be located in.

They also often tend to diversify by carrying products from other fellow Asian countries; Japanese supermarkets may carry some Chinese, Indonesian, Korean and Singaporean products; Korean supermarkets carry some Chinese and Japanese products; Chinese/Taiwanese supermarkets carry Korean, Japanese, Thai, Vietnamese products, and so on.

== Overview ==
Asian supermarkets carry items and ingredients generally well-suited for Asian cuisines and simply not found or considerably more expensive in most Western supermarkets, due to low turnover and small quantities.

While it primarily caters to a single particular Asian cultural group, many also additionally caters to other Asian immigrant groups who do not have easy access to foodstuffs from their country of origin. These are prevalent in Asian enclaves in the United States and Canada. Urban centers such as New York City, Los Angeles, Washington, D.C., San Diego, Chicago, Houston, Dallas, Atlanta, San Francisco, Philadelphia, St. Louis, and Seattle have Chinatowns, Little Indias, Little Saigons, Koreatowns, or Japantowns and other ethnic neighborhoods with specialty small business, but surrounding areas or smaller cities will have Asian supermarkets providing the same but reduced amenities for the same purposes.

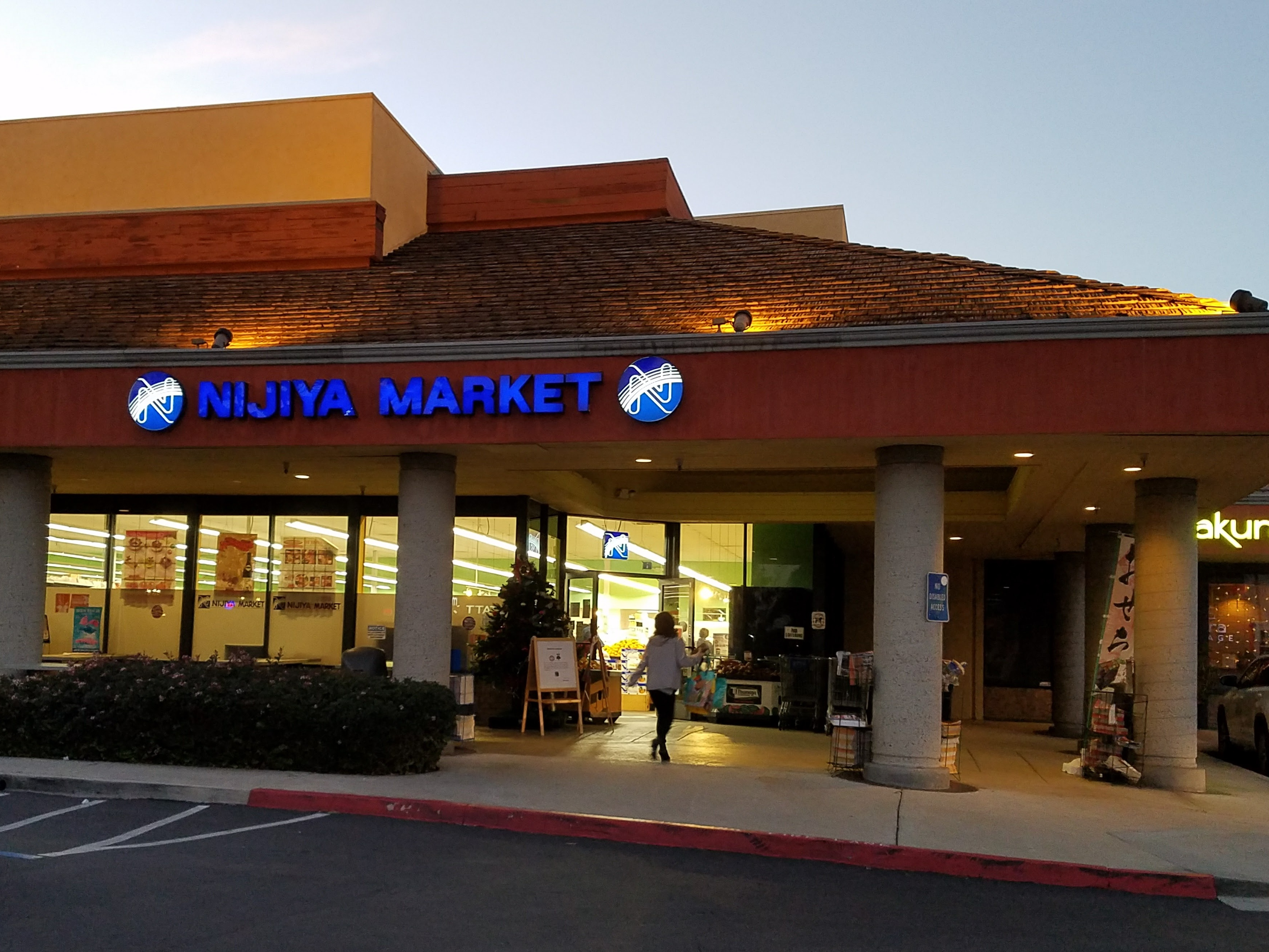
Nijiya Market, a Japanese chain market, in San Diego, California

Sometimes, these markets are surrounded by an Asian-themed strip mall. The markets are generally ethnocentric and may be mainly Chinese, Indonesian, Japanese or Filipino market; however, in many areas such supermarkets cater to a more diverse Asian population as a means of diversification and Pan-Asian cooperation.

It is this diversity that led to the establishment of Pan-Asian goods in a one-stop shop with aisles selling foods in common and others dedicated to other groups such as Pakistani, Bangladeshi, Indian, Malaysian, Singaporean, Vietnamese, Thai, Taiwanese, Korean, and others. Some Asian supermarkets in Australia and the United States also stock Pacific food items aimed at the Pacific Islander communities in those countries. Similarly, some Asian supermarkets in the Netherlands stock items from Suriname aimed at the large Surinamese communities of Indian and Javanese origins found in the country.

Despite sourcing from many multiple nations, items stocked are very different depending on their target ethnic market. For example, in Chinese and Vietnamese supermarkets it is common for animal meat to be hung on hooks for display; in Japanese supermarkets this is less common except for seafood. Chinese supermarkets may also carry Japanese products but the range of selection would be very limited as compared to a Japanese supermarket. For example, for green tea, in a Japanese market, an entire aisle may be dedicated to it, stocking a wide variety and grades of regional loose-leaf teas, whereas the Chinese market may simply carry a few brands of Japanese tea bags and bottled teas, while focusing on chrysanthemum tea.

== Chains ==
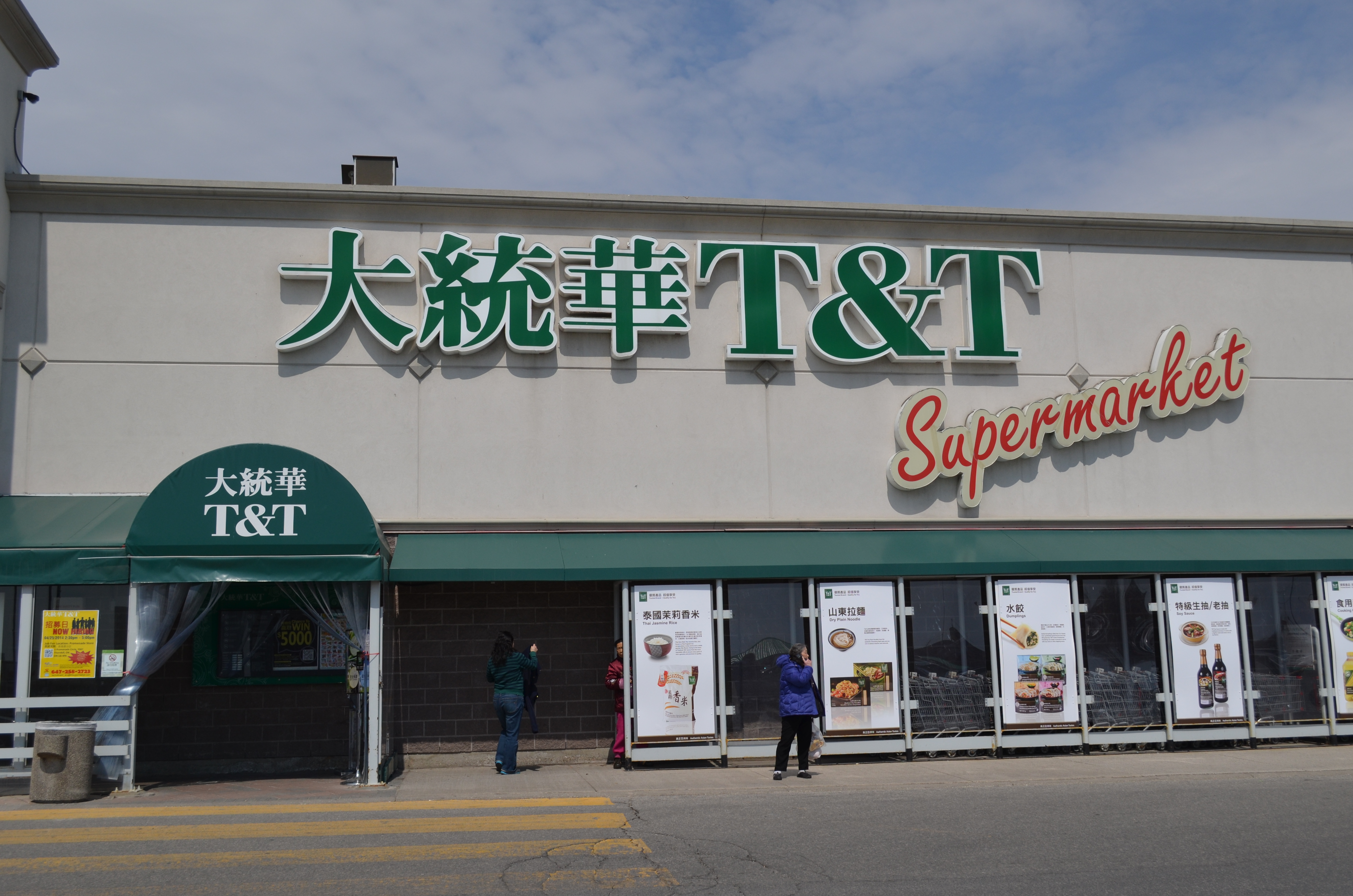
T&T Supermarket chain in Toronto, Ontario

Though most Asian supermarkets tend to be neighborhood-oriented, small and independent and may carry similar or even identical names, many large chains of stores have floor area that is comparable to other American supermarket chain stores. Among the largest of these chains is H Mart, which has 114 locations in the US and Canada.

Major chains include:

- Chinese/Taiwanese and Pan-Asian: Hong Kong Supermarket (US-6 locations), 99 Ranch Market (US), T&T Supermarket (Canada), 168 Market (US-California, Nevada, 6 stores), Kam Man Food (East Coast US), Hoo Hing (UK), Wing Yip (UK), Miracle Supermarket (Australia-New South Wales), Grand Asia Market (US), Nations Fresh Foods (Canada-Ontario), Lion Supermarket (US- Silicon Valley), zTao Marketplace (US-Texas, Georgia), G&L Supermarket (Good Luck Plaza 好運廣場) (Chinese, Southeast Asian, Indian, Korean and Japanese) (Australia-New South Wales) Asian Foods 亞洲食品 (Chinese, Japanese, Thai, Malaysian, Indonesian, Singaporean, Indian, Sri Lankan, Bangladeshi, Pakistani, Filipino and Korean) (Australia-Queensland) iFresh Supermarket, PriceSmart Foods (Canada-BC, 3 stores), Sungiven Foods (Canada-BC, 9 stores), Shun Fat Supermarket (US-15 locations)
- Filipino and Pan-Asian: Seafood City (US-25 stores, Canada-5 stores), Island Pacific Supermarket (US-California), Manila Oriental Market (Filipino, Japanese, Chinese, Vietnamese, Thai, Indian and Korean) (US-California), Amazing Oriental (東方行) (Chinese, Indian, Japanese, Malaysian, Filipino, Sri Lankan, Taiwanese, Vietnamese, Indonesian, Korean, Singaporean, Surinamese and Thai) (Netherlands)
- Hmong and Pan-Asian: Shuang Hur Supermarket (3 stores in Minneapolis and Saint Paul, Minnesota)
- Indian and Pan-Asian: Patel Brothers (US-54 stores), Subzi Mandi Cash & Carry (US-10 stores, Canada-5 stores), Sabzi Mandi (Canada-7 stores), Panchvati Supermarket (Canada-5 stores), MKS Spices 'N Things (Australia-Victoria), Asian Food Centre (Canada-7 stores), India Town Food Centre (Canada-2 stores).
- Japanese: Marukai (US, 14 stores), Nijiya Market (US, 12 stores), Mitsuwa Marketplace (US, 11 stores), Uwajimaya (Greater Seattle and Greater Portland, OR), Yaohan (defunct)
- Korean: H Mart (Over 100 stores as of 2024; 97 stores in the United States plus 12 stores in Canada and 2 stores in the United Kingdom), Oseyo (UK, 20 stores), Lotte Plaza (US, 14 stores), Hannam Chain (US, 7 Stores), Zion Market (US, 6 stores), K-Mart (FR, 6 stores), Assi Market (US, 3 stores), Market Ribbon (Canada, 2 stores), Arirang Supermarket (US, 2 stores), Galleria Supermarket (Canada-Greater Toronto)
- Vietnamese: Shun Fat Supermarket (US-15 locations)

=== Online ===
Due to concentration of immigrant communities in metropolitan areas, few Asian supermarket chain stores are located in non-metro areas. In order to better compete and serve this market, a few of these chains have begun online sales, which compete directly with the likes of general online e-commerce merchandisers such as Amazon.com, Walmart.com, Shopee and Rakuten.

=== In Asia ===
Major operators in Asia such as AEON, Don Quijote (Don Don Donki) and Jusco operate somewhat like Asian supermarkets, as they offer products not normally found in their home countries; as such they also serve as a platform for selling regional Asian cuisines and foods from their origin country. An example would be selling a Singaporean drink in Japan and vice versa, when they are both Asian countries.

=== Expansion and Spread in the United States ===
In 2025, H Mart, one of the largest Asian supermarket chains in the U.S., announced plans to expand its stores and renovate them across states. California, Florida, Washington, and New Jersey have undergone renovations. This expansion displays the demand for Asian grocery stores to attract more non-asian consumers across the country.

== Operations ==
Most of these supermarkets are started and operated by Asian immigrant entrepreneurs and their families. Others are started by investors of existing corporate conglomerates already headquartered in Asia, namely Mainland China, Hong Kong, Japan, the Philippines, Singapore, South Korea, and Taiwan.

Asian supermarkets can range from small mom-and-pop grocery stores to large big-box stores and may cater specifically to one ethnic Asian immigrant group or to a wide pan-Asian crowd. They serve the generally unserved or underserved immigrant and descendant population. They are usually the main attraction for food shopping within overseas Asian shopping malls and Chinatowns. Asian supermarkets may re-occupy older buildings formerly anchored by mainstream regional or national supermarket chains.

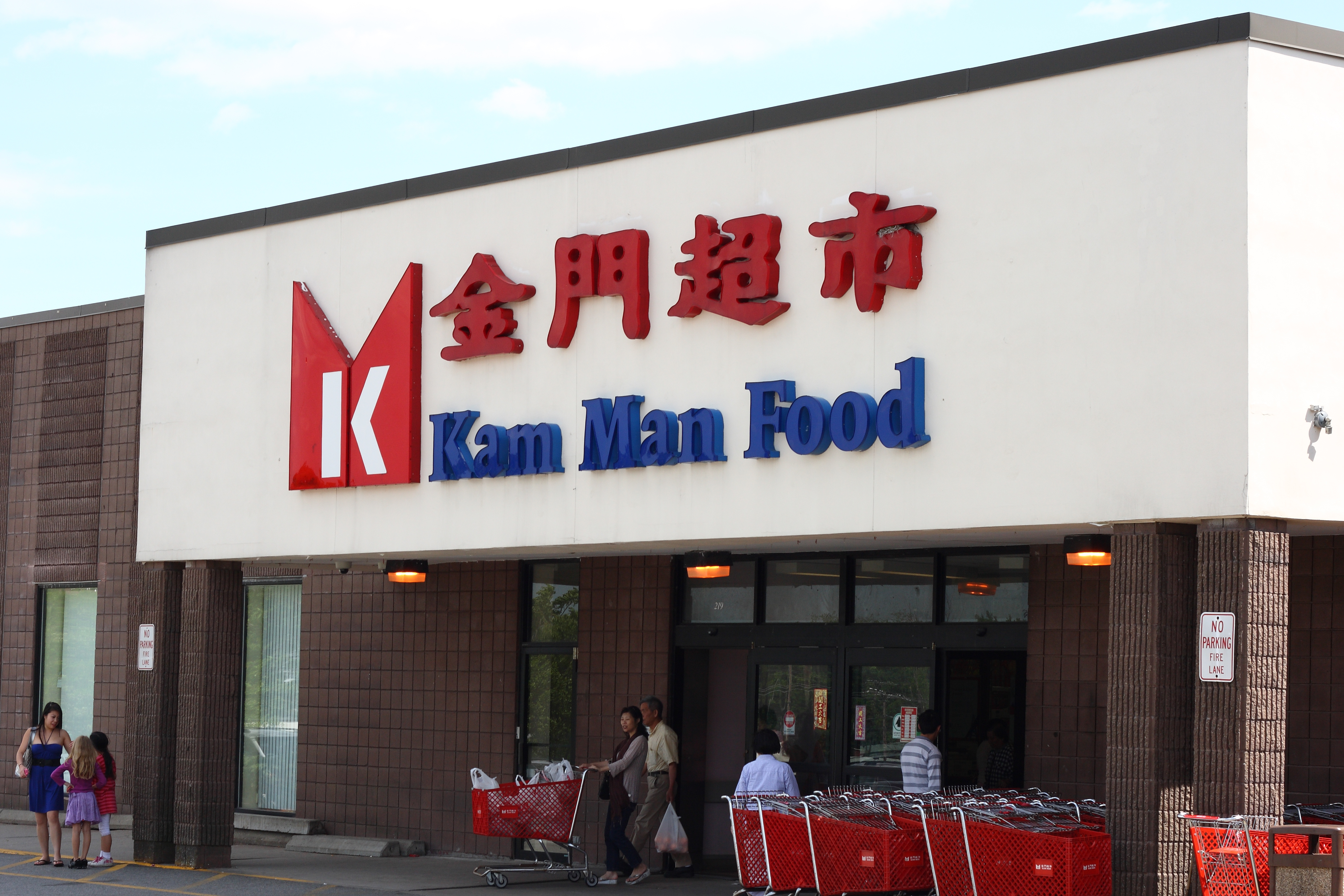
Kam Man Food in Quincy, Massachusetts

Chinese shopping centers and supermarkets have been constructed using traditional Chinese architecture, and provide services catered toward immigrant customers. Examples include Asian restaurants, beauty salons, bakeries, foreign film rental stores, travel agencies, book stores, and other businesses.

In recent years, some mainstream markets have attempted to compete with Asian supermarkets for the minority customer base by stocking certain Asian goods as well as directing marketing towards various Asian ethnic immigrant populations. Conversely, some Asian supermarkets attempt to appeal to the general population. Asian markets are reputed to have lower prices than the mainstream chains.

Asian supermarkets represent a new trend in which Asian immigrants no longer settle in old enclaves such as Chinatown, San Francisco but in suburbs where shopping centers provide services as well as cultural amenities, such as hosting ethnic festivals, shows and dance.

One of the major redevelopments highlighted in the press has been Buford Highway in the Atlanta suburb of Doraville, Georgia. Such supermarkets have also revitalized the once-rundown sections of Bellaire Blvd in Houston, Texas, and turned it into a new Asian shopping district. There are also many competing Chinese supermarkets in the Southern California Chinatowns and Vietnamese markets anchoring communities such as Little Saigon.

== Products ==
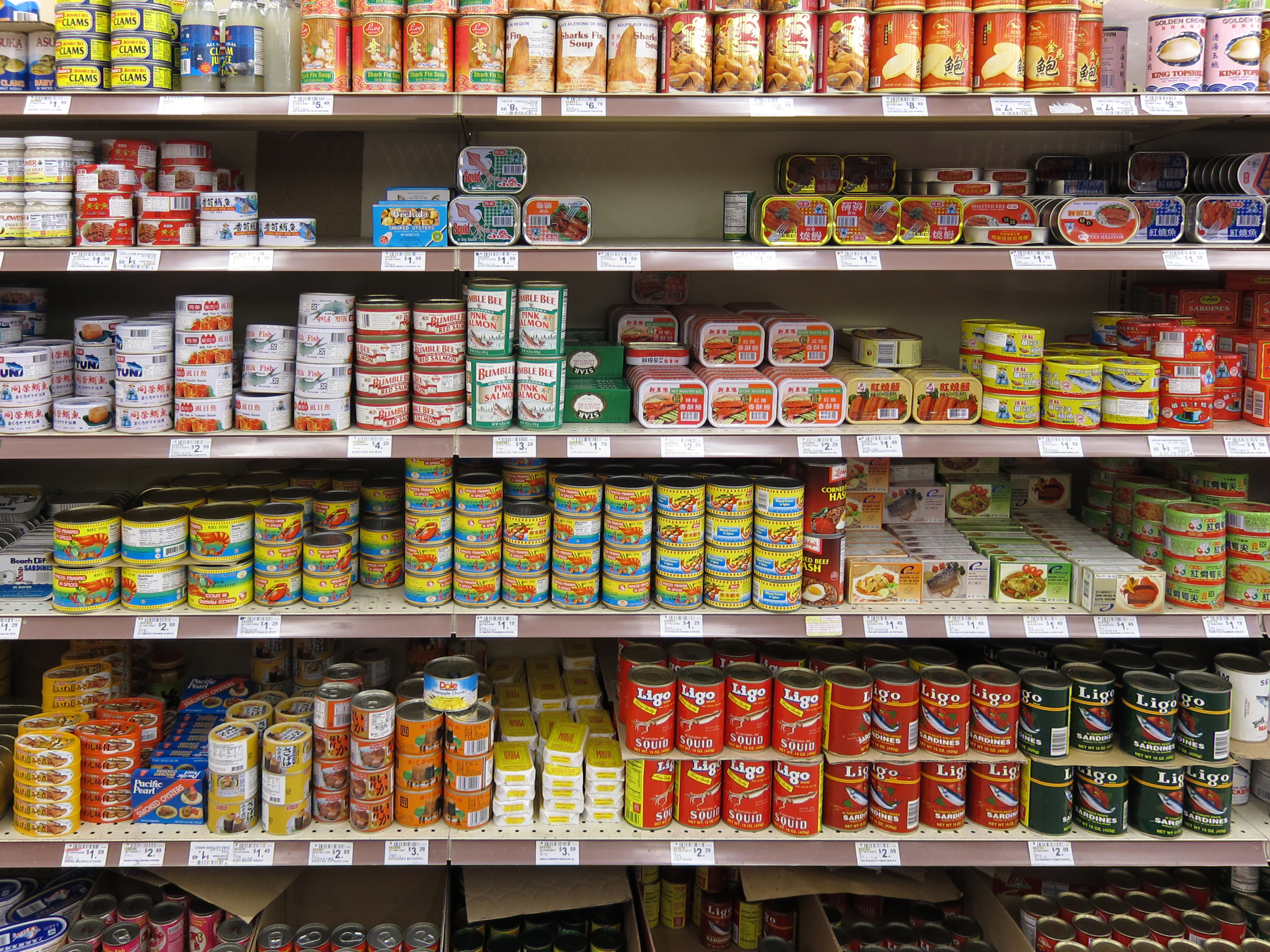
Shelves of Asian canned goods in a 99 Ranch Market store

Asian branded products
Category	Examples
Vegetable	nori/gim and green laver (parae/aonori), bamboo shoots, bok choy, bean sprouts, welsh onions, ginger, kang kong, mustard greens, daikon
Fruit	durian, pomelo, Asian pear, mango, lychee, mangosteen, rambutan, coconut
Grain	jasmine rice, basmati rice
Beverage	soy milk, chrysanthemum tea, bubble tea, sake, soju, green tea, thai iced tea, oolong tea, Ramune
Seasoning	chili, soy sauce, Phu Quoc fish sauce
Ingredients	black bean, century eggs, ginseng
Packaged snacks	prawn crackers, Pocky, rice cakes, Tobi nuts, dried Jackfruit
Merchandise	rice cookers, woks, fashion magazines, newspapers, cigarettes
Bakery	Chinese pastries, Curry puffs, banh mi
Seafood	fish, shellfish, sushi
Delicacies	sea cucumber, shark fin, abalones
Meat	Chinese sausage

International brands
Controlling polity	Brand
Australia	Maharajah's Choice, Pandaroo, The Han Kitchen, Soul Papa & Co, bubbleme
China	Haw flakes, Tsingtao Beer
Canada	Brar's, Nanak's, Surati
Cambodia	Angkor Beer
Hong Kong	Lee Kum Kee, Vitasoy, Bamboo Garden, Sau Tao, Amoy Foods, Swire Sugars
India	Amul, India Gate, Old Monk
Indonesia	Indofood, Kopiko, Teh botol, Bintang Beer
Japan	Calbee, Calpis, Glico, Kikkoman (JFC), Meiji, Maruchan, Nissin Foods, Shirakiku, Pocari Sweat, Ajinomoto, Yamasa, S&B, House Foods, Kagome, Sapporo, Morinaga (Mori-Nu), Yakult, Asahi, Kirin, Ito-en, Yamamotoyama, Kadoya, Nagatanien(ja), Nishimoto
Korea	Binggrae, CJ CheilJedang, Crown, Dongwon, Haitai, HiteJinro, Lotte, Nongshim, Orion, Ottogi, Paldo, Pulmuone, Samyang Food
Malaysia	Brahim's, Baba's (பாபா), Julie's, Lingam's, Munchy's, Rotiboy, OldTown White Coffee
Nepal	Wai Wai
Philippines	Barrio Fiesta, Goldilocks, Tobi Nuts, San Miguel Brewery, Mama Sita's
Singapore	100plus, Axe Brand, Ayam, Asian Home Gourmet, Irvins, Koka noodles, Marigold, Pokka, Prima Taste, Tiger Beer, Yeo's, Tee Yih Jia, Tiger Balm, TWG Tea, Ya Kun
Sri Lanka	Dilmah
Taiwan	Uni-President Enterprises Corporation, Wei Chuan, I-Mei, Companion Foods, Chin Chin, Ve Wong, Kimlan Foods, Hsin Tung Yang, Want Want, Chimei
Thailand	Chaokoh, Aroy-D, Thai President Foods (Mama), Tiparos, Lobo, Malee, Charoen Pokphand Foods, Vitamilk
Vietnam	Vinamilk, Bao Long, Trung Nguyên
United Kingdom	Patak's, Sharwood's
United States	King's Hawaiian, Thai Kitchen and Simply Asia, Sriracha, VH, Sun Noodle, Sun Foods LLC (Hinode)

== See also ==
- Religious goods store
- Chinatown
- Koreatown
- Japantown
- Vietnamtown
- Little Manila
- Night market
- Wet market
- Toko (shop), similar type of shop in the Netherlands
- List of supermarket chains in the United States
