= Super H =

Super H can refer to:

- Super H, A North American supermarket chain, part of the Hmart group
- SuperH, a brand name of a certain microcontroller and microprocessor architecture
