= Island Pacific Supermarket =

Filipino-American supermarket chain

- Type: Private
- Industry: Retail, Supermarket, Grocery, Food court
- Founded: March 2000; 26 years ago Panorama City, California
- Founder: Nino Jefferson Lim
- Headquarters: City of Industry, CA
- Number of locations: 20 (2025)
- Area served: California, Nevada
- Key people: Nino Jefferson Lim (Founder); Maite Defensor (CEO)
- Website: http://www.islandpacificmarket.com/

Island Pacific Supermarket, also known as Island Pacific Seafood Market, is a Filipino-American supermarket chain operating 21 stores across California, Nevada, and Washington. Headquartered in City of Industry, California, the chain specializes in Filipino cuisine, offering fresh seafood, meat, produce, condiments, frozen foods, and snacks. It also carries a selection of Asian and American food staples.

== History ==
The founder of Island Pacific Supermarket, Nino Jefferson Lim, graduated from the University of Southern California with a bachelor's degree in accounting. He then decided that, instead of becoming an accountant in New York City, he would enter the supermarket business. In March 2000, he founded Island Pacific, opening his first location in Panorama City, Los Angeles, California.

In February 2024, Maite Defensor was appointed as CEO. Defensor holds a degree in economics from the University of the Philippines and pursued further studies at Harvard University. Prior to her appointment, she held leadership roles across various sectors including construction, mining, finance, and public service. She served as president and CEO of the Philippine National Construction Corporation and was a congressional representative for the Third District of Quezon City in the Philippine House of Representatives, where she advocated for anti-discrimination and antitrust legislation.

== Locations ==
A location of Island Pacific Supermarket in Granada Hills, California.

As of February 2026, Island Pacific operates 21 Locations: 17 in California, 3 in Nevada, and 1 in Washington.

=== Newest Island Pacific Seafood Market Location ===
In 2024, Island Pacific opened a new location in Los Angeles, California, at 4641 Santa Monica Boulevard, Los Angeles, CA 90029. This branch features an expanded food service area with in‑house concepts such as PhilHouse, Crab Mentality, and San Honoré Panaderia. It reflects the brand’s commitment to modernizing the Filipino shopping and dining experience in the U.S.

In 2025, Island Pacific expanded further with a new store in Federal Way, Washington, located at 31811 Pacific Highway South, Federal Way, WA 98003. The Federal Way branch offers Filipino grocery staples, fresh seafood, baked goods, and in‑house hot food. With this opening, the company continues its mission to bring Filipino products closer to communities across the United States.

==== North California store locations ====
- Elk Grove (8430 Elk Grove Florin Rd. Elk Grove, CA)
- Fresno (6048 N. 1st St. Fresno, CA)
- Hayward (19691 Hesperian Blvd. Hayward, CA)
- Pittsburg (2100 N. Park Blvd. Pittsburg, CA)
- Union City (4122 Dyer St. Union City, CA)
- Vallejo (2110 Spring Rd. #24, Vallejo, CA)

==== Southern California store locations ====
- Canoga Park (20922 Roscoe Blvd. Canoga Park)
- Cerritos (11481 South St. Cerritos, CA)
- Eagle Rock (4044 N. Eagle Rock Blvd. Los Angeles, CA)
- Long Beach (3300 Atlantic Ave. Long Beach)
- National City (2720 E. Plaza Blvd. Ste A, National City)
- Oxnard (4833 S. Rose Ave. Oxnard, CA)
- Santa Clarita (19387 Soledad Canyon Rd. Santa Clarita)
- Temecula (44060 Margarita Rd. Temecula, CA)
- West Covina (1512 E. Amar Rd. West Covina, CA)
- Lake Forest (23811 El Toro Rd. #C, Lake Forest, CA)
- Granada Hills (11130 Balboa Blvd. #A, Granada Hills, CA)
- Los Angeles (4641 Santa Monica Blvd. Los Angeles, CA)

==== Las Vegas Nevada store locations ====
- Nellis (317 N. Nellis Blvd. Las Vegas, NV)
- Silverado (467 E. Silverado Ranch Blvd. Las Vegas)
- Tropicana (8650 W. Tropicana Ave. Las Vegas)

==== Washington store locations ====
- Federal Way (31811 Pacific Highway South Federal Way, WA 98003)

== Brands | In-house Concepts ==
=== PhilHouse ===
The in-house fast food (turo-turo) restaurant located within all Island Pacific stores. It specializes in Filipino meals inspired by lutong-bahay (home cooking), offering dishes such as adobo, sinigang, and kare-kare.

=== Crab Mentality ===
A seafood restaurant concept within select Island Pacific locations. It offers seafood boil dishes featuring crab, shrimp, mussels, and other shellfish, prepared with Filipino-inspired sauces such as garlic butter and spicy cajun. As of 2025, Crab Mentality operates in the Los Angeles and Santa Clarita branches.

=== Chirp & Oink ===
A fast food concept at Island Pacific that focuses on Filipino-style chicken and pork dishes. Its menu includes fried specialties such as empanada, fried chicken, and Filipino-style spaghetti. Chirp & Oink is currently available at the Santa Clarita location.

=== San Honoré Panaderia ===
A bakery brand available in select Island Pacific locations. It specializes in traditional Filipino breads and pastries, including pandesal, ensaymada, and hopia. Locations include Granada Hills, Lake Forest, Fresno, Hayward, Union City, Eagle Rock and Los Angeles.

=== Island Pacific Cargo (IP Cargo) ===
IP Cargo is the shipping and logistics arm of Island Pacific, a Filipino supermarket chain in the United States. It provides Balikbayan box services to the Philippines, offering affordable rates and reliable delivery to help overseas Filipinos send goods and gifts to their families back home.

== Tenant Partners ==
Island Pacific Supermarket collaborates with various Filipino-owned businesses to enhance its in-store offerings and provide a broader cultural experience for its customers. These partnerships vary by location and reflect the chain's commitment to serving the Filipino-American community.

In select branches, such as Santa Clarita, Island Pacific hosts Goldilocks, a Filipino bakery chain known for its traditional cakes and pastries; Boba Oppa, a milk tea shop chain; and M Lhuillier, a Philippine-based money remittance service.

Additionally, Max's Restaurant, a popular Filipino casual dining chain recognized for its signature fried chicken and traditional dishes, operates within Island Pacific locations in Granada Hills and Los Angeles.

== See also ==
- Little Manila
- Asian supermarket
