= H Mart =

American chain of Asian supermarkets

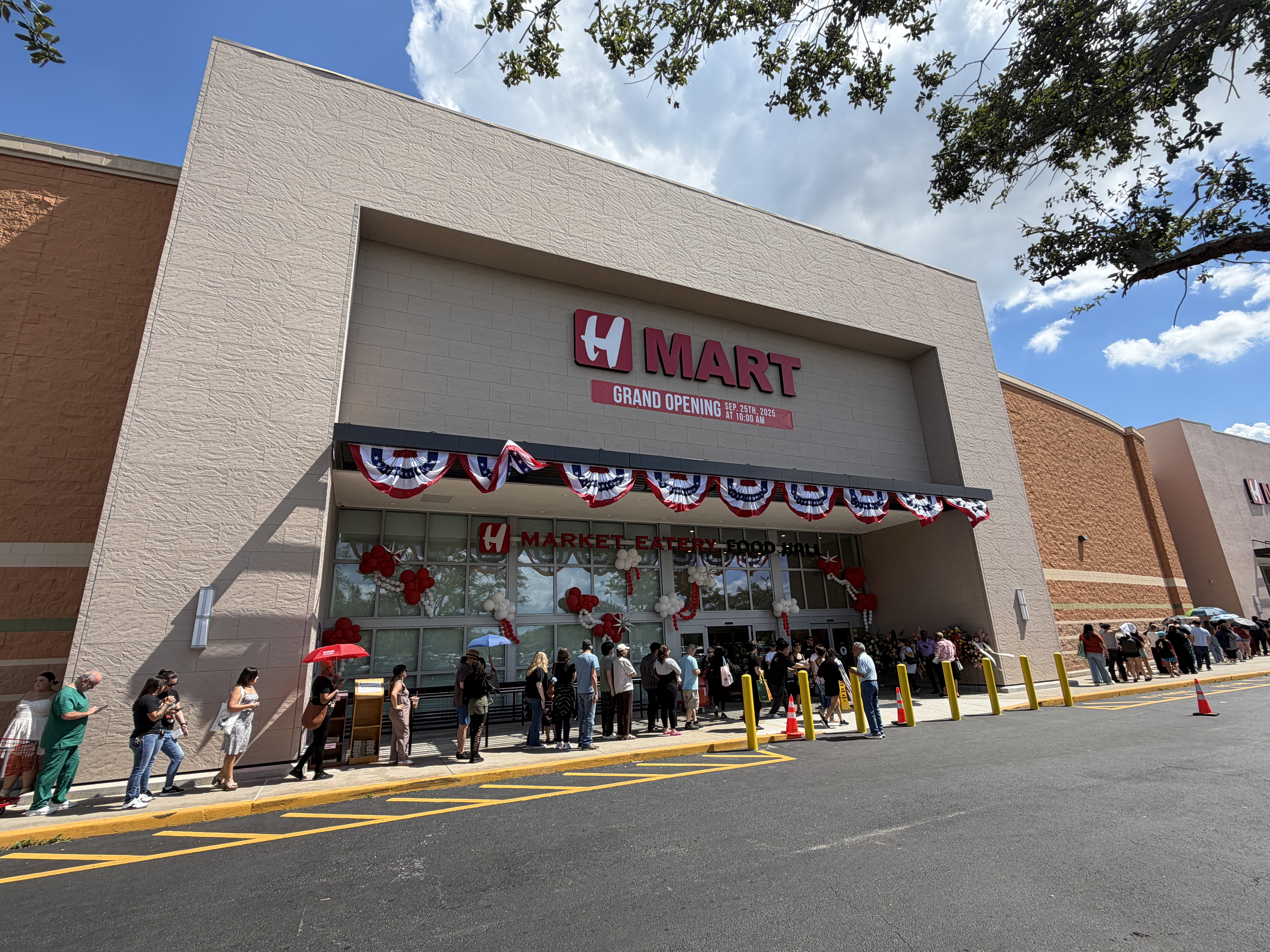
- H Mart grand opening in Orlando, Florida
- Native name: 한아름 마트, H 마트
- Type: Private company
- Industry: Grocery
- Founded: September 1982; 44 years ago (as Han Ah Reum); Woodside, Queens, New York City, US
- Founder: Il Yeon Kwon
- Headquarters: Fort Lee, New Jersey, U.S.
- Number of locations: 98 (US); 2 (UK); 22 (Canada)
- Area served: United States, Canada, United Kingdom
- Key people: Il Yeon Kwon (CEO)
- Revenue: ▲US$1.050 billion (2013)
- Number of employees: 5,500
- Parent: Hanahreum Group

Korean name
- Hangul: H 마트
- RR: H mateu
- MR: H mat'ŭ

Alternate name
- Hangul: 한아름 마트
- RR: Hanareum mateu
- MR: Hanarŭm mat'ŭ
- Website: hmart.com

H Mart (Korean: H 마트 or 한아름 마트) is an American chain of Asian supermarkets operated by the Hanahreum Group, headquartered in Fort Lee, New Jersey. The chain has more than 97 stores throughout the United States, operated variously as H Mart, H Mart Northwest, and H Mart Colorado. There are two stores in the Pacific Northwest that operate as "G Mart" that are associated with H Mart. H Mart also has stores in Canada and two in the United Kingdom. H Mart is the largest U.S.-based grocery store chain that specializes in Asian-style products and caters to Asian-American shoppers.

The "H" in "H Mart" stands for the store's original name, Han Ah Reum (한아름), which means "an armful" in Korean.

== History ==
The H Mart chain began in 1982 in Woodside, Queens, in New York City, as a small corner grocery store. The original store was opened by Il Yeon Kwon, an immigrant from South Korea, under the name Han Ah Reum. Subsequent H Marts were operated differently from the original location, which maintained the original name and signage until it was remodeled in 2023.

=== United States ===
From 1982 to 1991, the company added 10 stores, mostly in the Northeastern United States.

In 1997, the company opened its first store in the Washington-Baltimore metropolitan area, in Falls Church, Virginia. On October 19, 1998, the chain opened its current headquarters in Lyndhurst in Bergen County, the U.S. county with the highest Korean population percentage, at 6.9%.

After its 2001 opening, an H Mart store in northern Virginia gained many Hispanic American employees. After cultural conflicts between Hispanic and Korean American employees in one store, the H Mart headquarters provided an intercultural training program, with translations into Spanish.

In 2004, the first Super H Mart opened in Duluth, Georgia. By 2005, the chain had 17 stores; by the following March, it had 22, all on the East Coast except for two stores in Denver, Colorado. Its first West Coast location, in Federal Way, Washington, opened in April 2006.

In spring 2017, H Mart opened a 43,000-square-foot (4,000 m^{2}) store in San Jose, California. In summer 2018, H Mart signed a lease for a 42,000-square-foot (3,900 m^{2}) store in San Francisco.

In June 2024, H Mart opened its first store in Utah, which at 100,000 square feet is the chain's largest store.

On September 25, 2025, H Mart made its debut in Florida, having their grand opening in Orlando.

As of 2025, there were more than 97 H Mart stores in the United States, located in New York, New Jersey, Arizona, California, Colorado, Florida, Georgia, Hawaii, Illinois, Maryland, Massachusetts, Michigan, North Carolina, Oregon, Pennsylvania, Texas, Utah, Virginia, and Washington.

=== Canada ===
H Mart began moving into western Canada in December 2003, with its first store in Coquitlam, British Columbia, a West Coast location that opened ahead of stores in Seattle, Los Angeles, and San Francisco. In subsequent years, the company opened stores in Downtown Vancouver and Langley in 2006; Richmond in 2012; Port Coquitlam in 2016; and Victoria in 2025.

In 2013, the company opened its first urban convenience format on Yonge Street and Churchill Avenue in the Toronto-suburb of Willowdale called "M2M–morning to midnight". The two-story, 4,500-square-foot (420 m^{2}) store is the first one in Canada. There are currently three other M2M stores in the U.S., two in Manhattan and one in Seattle. A larger H Mart opened on Yonge Street in Richmond Hill, with another opening in Downtown Toronto across from Ryerson University (now Toronto Metropolitan University) in 2017. In July 2019, an H Mart opened in Edmonton, Alberta, followed by a second store in Edmonton beside the University of Alberta campus in December 2019 and its first location in Calgary in 2020. Another store opened in Calgary in Beacon Hill in October 2023. As of June 21, 2024 H Mart made their entry into the French Canadian province of Quebec by acquiring 3 Jang Teu grocery stores in Montreal.

=== United Kingdom ===
H Mart Europe Limited was incorporated in 2009, and in 2011, H Mart opened its first store in Europe, in the New Malden area of London.

== Customer base ==
H Mart has cultivated a diverse and expanding customer base that mirrors the nation's multicultural landscape. Originally established to serve Korean immigrants, H Mart has become a cornerstone for various Asian-American groups, including Chinese, Japanese, Vietnamese, and Filipino communities.

The store has also extended its appeal beyond Asian-American shoppers, as approximately one-third of its recent customers are now non-Asian. In terms of gender distribution, 59% are female and 41% are male, and the largest segment of visitors falls within the 25–34 age range. In terms of geographic reach, while H Mart has a significant presence in states with large Asian-American populations, such as California, New York, and New Jersey, it has also expanded to areas with relatively smaller Asian communities like Utah and Nevada.

== Controversies ==
In 2006, a civil suit was filed against H Mart for discrimination against white people when three tenants of the West Willow Shopping Mall in Willowbrook, Canada, which the company had moved into and then bought, filed a complaint with the British Columbia Human Rights Tribunal alleging that the company wanted to turn it into an Asian-only market. All three tenants made a claim when their leases were not renewed despite being long-term leaseholders within the mall. In late 2007, tribunal member Lindsay Lyster dismissed their complaint on the grounds that it had no reasonable prospect of success and did not merit a hearing. She wrote:

In the end, I have concluded that the complainants' case is based on little more than conjecture based on what they read in the media and H-Mart's reputation as a "Korean market," as seen through the lens of their own unhappiness in being unable to maintain their businesses in the mall.

In 2012, picketers gathered outside one of the Flushing stores to protest against H Mart's hiring practices. Protest organizer Jim MacDonald said the store, and other H Marts nearby, disproportionately hired Asian people, specifically Korean-Americans. H Mart responded in a statement that the company "does not screen employees by race, but by their capabilities"; for example, the Flushing store hires many Korean speakers to better serve its many customers who do not speak English.

In 2012, Korean news agencies and government agencies alleged that H Mart laundered money for former South Korean dictator Chun Doo-hwan, who was convicted of embezzling hundreds of millions of dollars during his autocratic rule, and his family. In December 2012, Korean news channel, TV Chosun reported that "South Korean prosecutors have traced Chun Doo-Hwan's secret funding to H Mart, as they found suspicious money laundering in an account”. In August 2013, TV Chosun retracted earlier claims as unfounded speculations. The station confirmed that H Mart was not under investigation in relation to overseas funds connected with Chun Doo-Hwan.

== See also ==
- Koreatown
- Oseyo
- Wing Yip
- Mitsuwa Marketplace
- 99 Ranch Market
- Marukai Corporation U.S.A.
- Nijiya Market
- Kam Man Food
- T&T Supermarket
