= Oseyo =

Supermarket chain for Korean food

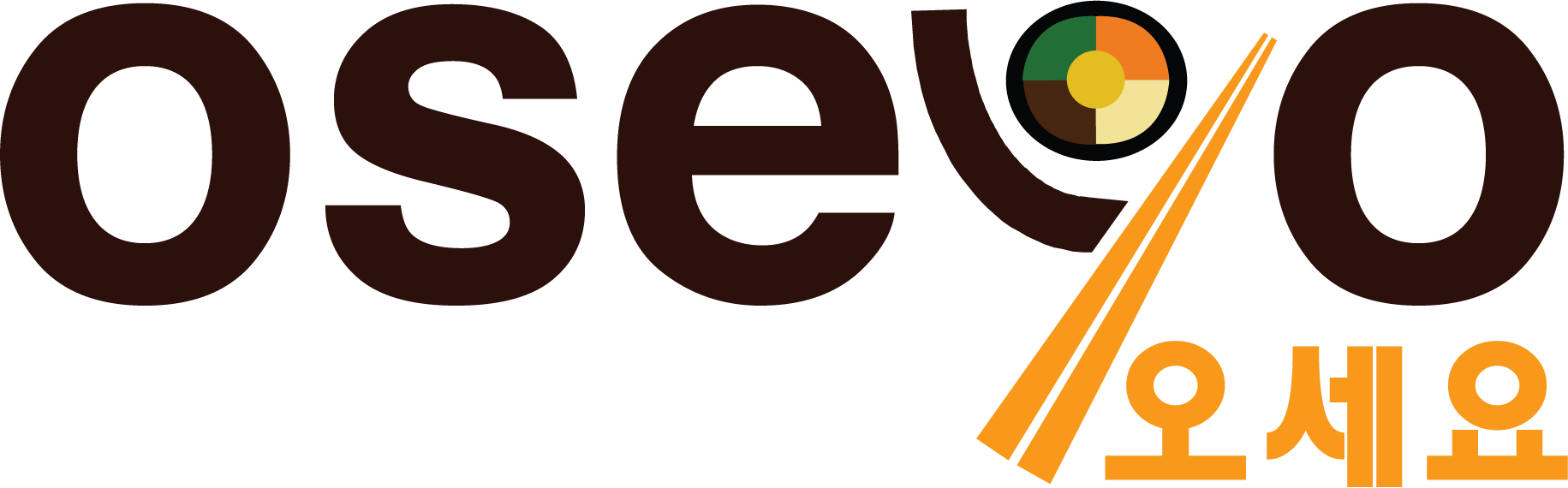

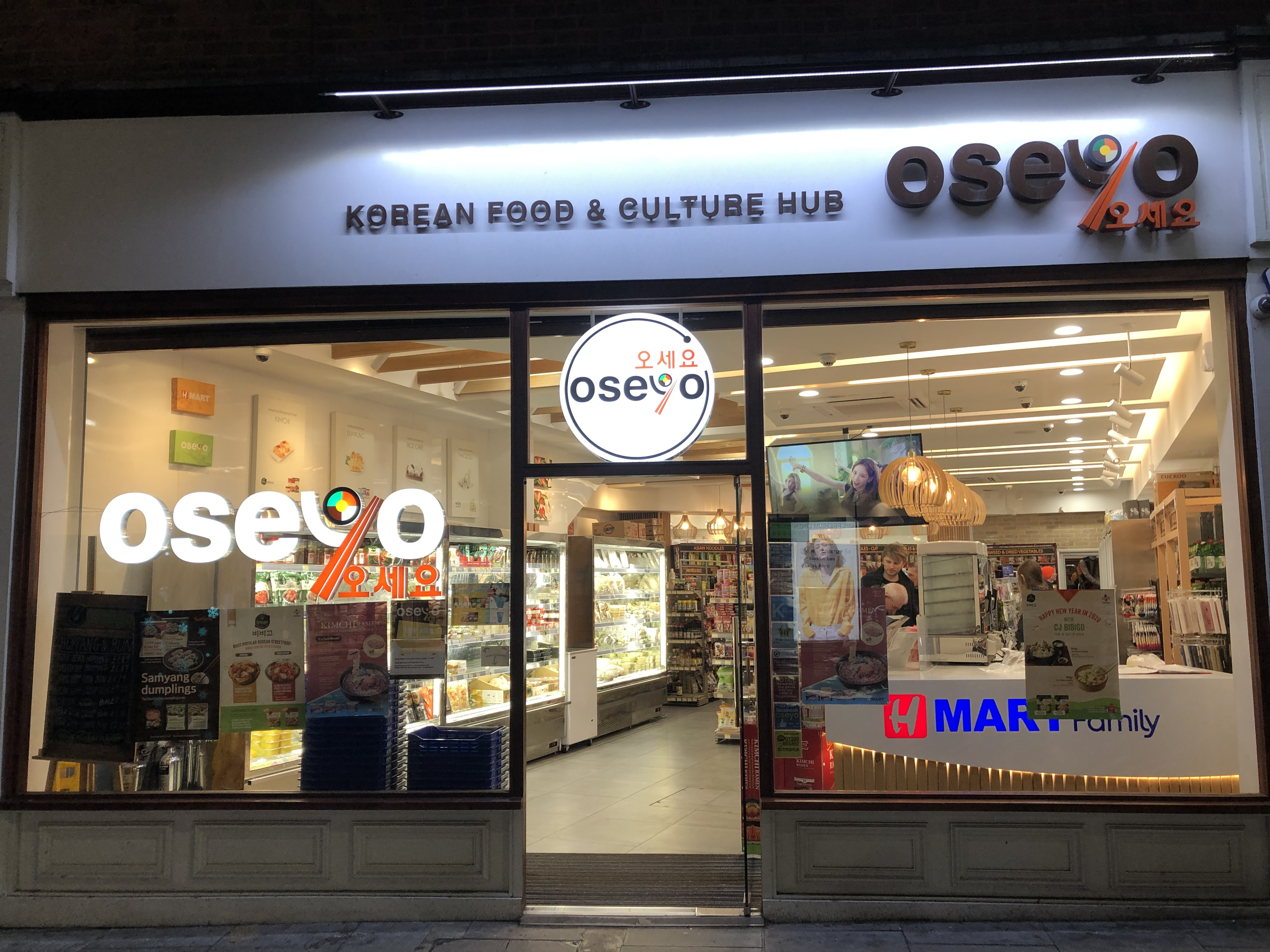
- Type: Private limited company
- Industry: Retail
- Founded: 2015; 11 years ago
- Headquarters: London, UK
- Number of locations: 20
- Products: Groceries, consumer goods
- Number of employees: 100+
- Website: www.oseyo.co.uk

Oseyo (Korean: 오세요) is a supermarket chain specializing in Korean foods, as well as other Asian products. The company is the UK's largest specialist grocery retailer.

== Overview ==
The company currently has 20 branches in the United Kingdom, 14 of which are located in London.

The first store was opened on Tottenham Court Road, London in 2015. By 2019, it had five stores in London.

While all other branches used to mainly focus on selling grocery items, London Waterloo station shop used to also cater for hot foods, and originally offering a number of seats for eating in Korean meals, before this was discontinued in 2022.

The company is a part of H Mart group, which launched its first store in Europe in London New Malden in 2011.

Although specialising in Korean food, a variety of other Asian products, from Japan, China, Thailand, Vietnam, Philippines, Malaysia and Taiwan. Stationery and household products are part of its product range.

When translated from Korean into English, the name "Oseyo" means "Please come in".

== Branches ==
London

- Tottenham Court Road
- Camden Town
- Waterloo
- Angel
- Soho
- Hammersmith
- Battersea Power Station
- Kingston
- Paddington Square
- London Bridge
- Victoria Place
- Wimbledon
- Notting Hill
- Liverpool Street Station

Outside London

- Manchester Arndale
- Manchester (Oxford Road)
- Cambridge
- Guildford
- Birmingham
- Sheffield
- Newcastle-Upon-Tyne

== See also ==
- Asian supermarket
- Wing Yip
- British Koreans
