= Nishimoto Trading Co., Ltd. =

Japanese food distribution company

Coordinates: 35°39′24.74″N 139°45′24.02″E

Nishimoto Trading Co., LTD.
- Founded: 1912
- Headquarters: Minato, Tokyo, Japan
- Area served: Worldwide
- Key people: Richard Hashii (President)
- Website: wismettacusa.com

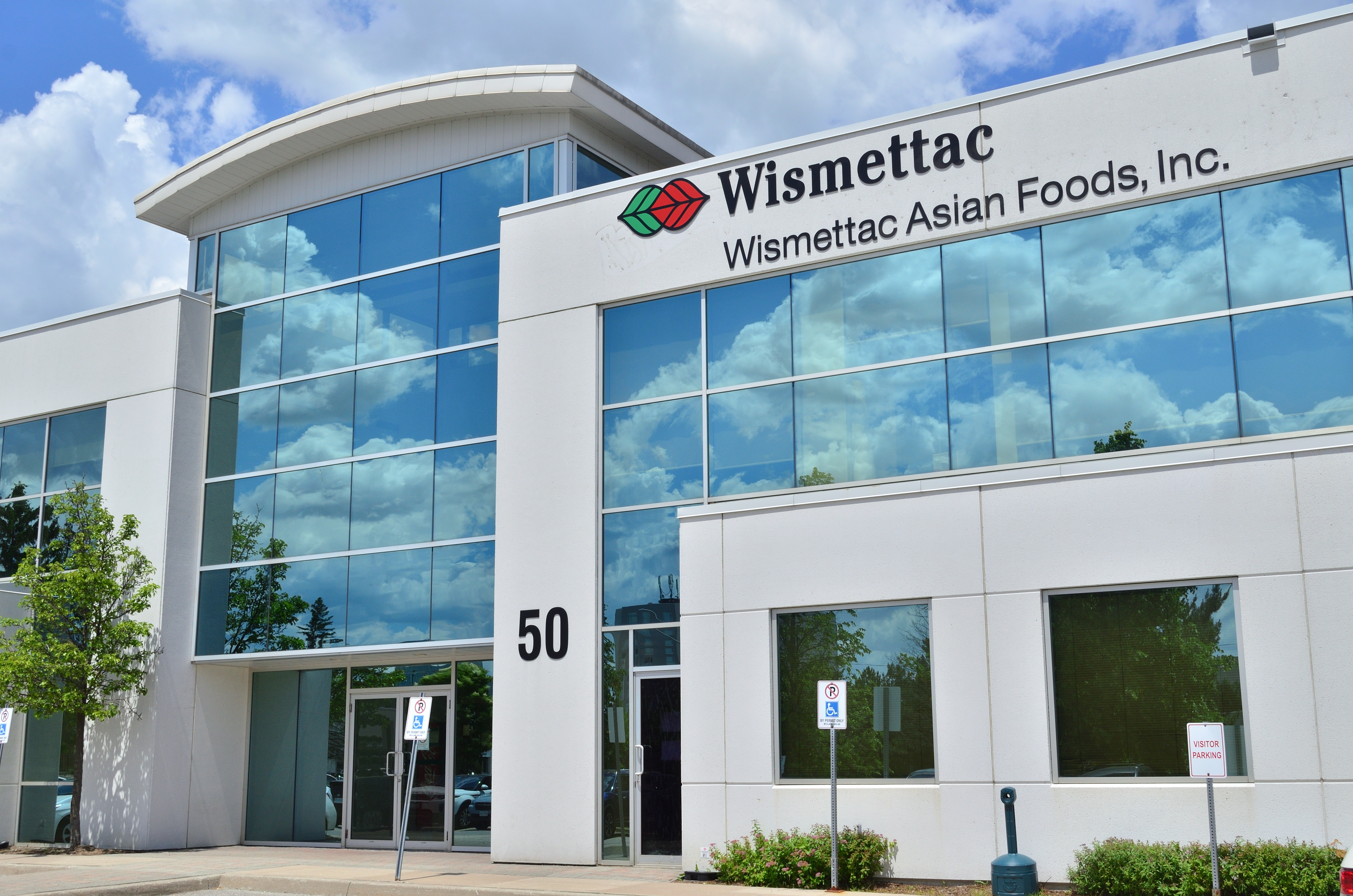
Wismettac Asian Foods

Nishimoto Trading Co., Ltd. (西本貿易株式会社, Nishimoto Bōeki Kabushiki Gaisha) is a Japanese import, export, wholesale and distribution company that mainly handles Asian food products. Established in 1912, the company is headquartered in Hamamatsuchō, Minato, Tokyo, and has branch offices around the world.

One of the subsidiaries of the Nishimoto Wismettac Group is Harro Foods in the UK.
