= Kam Man Food =

Chinese supermarket chain based in the United States

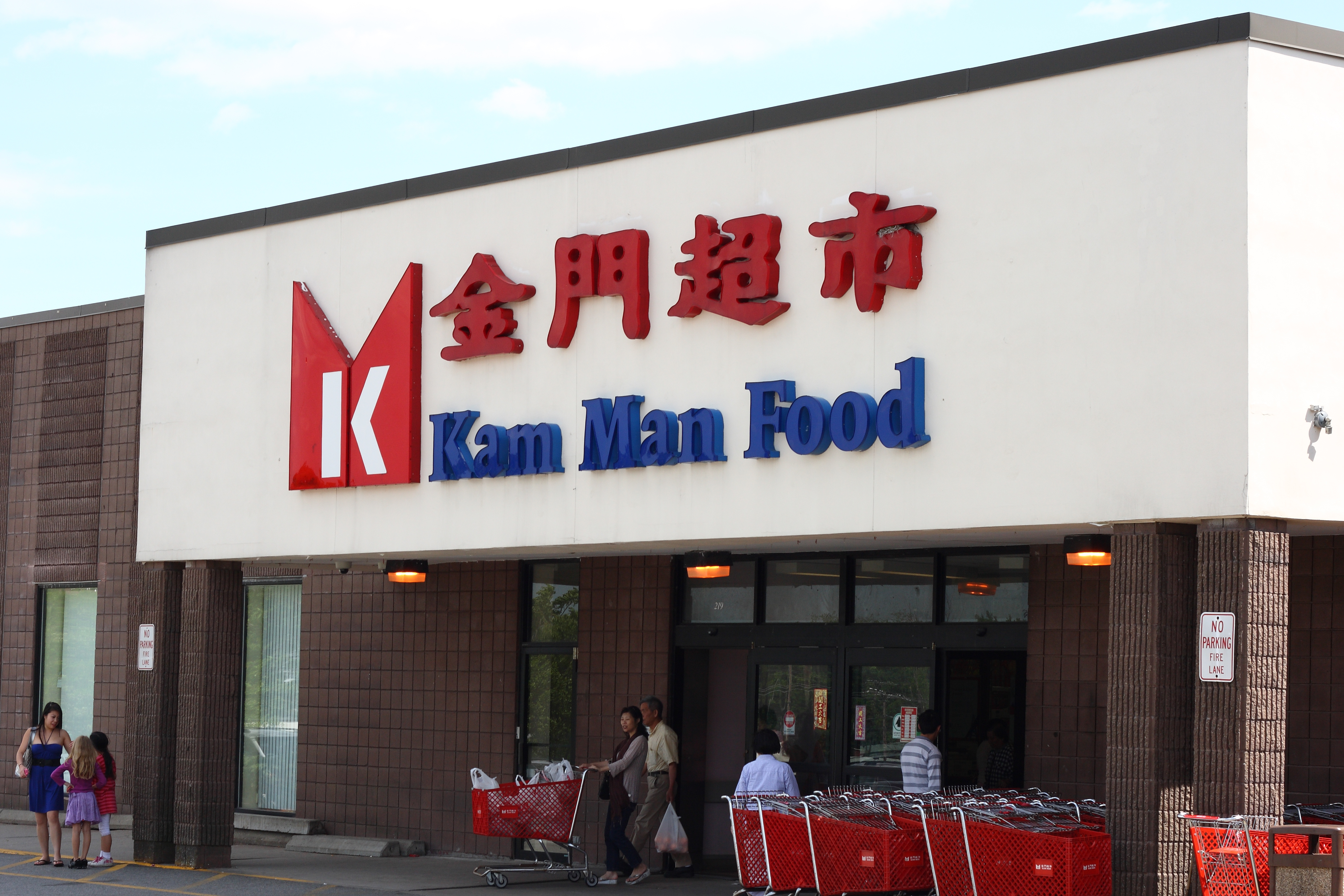
- Type: Private
- Industry: Retail
- Founded: 1972; 54 years ago in Chinatown, Manhattan
- Headquarters: Edison, NJ
- Number of locations: 4
- Area served: New Jersey, Massachusetts, New York
- Website: kamman.com

Kam Man Food
- Traditional Chinese: 金門市場
- Simplified Chinese: 金门市场
- Literal meaning: Golden Door Market
Transcriptions
Standard Mandarin
- Hanyu Pinyin: Jīnmēn Shìchǎng
Yue: Cantonese
- Jyutping: gam1 mun4 si5 coeng4

Kam Man Food (Chinese: 金門市場; abbreviated KM Food) is a Chinese supermarket chain with its corporate headquarters in Edison, New Jersey, United States.

Its original location is in Chinatown, New York City. While it has its main store in Manhattan (named "New Kam Man"), it also has locations in Quincy, Massachusetts, Edison, New Jersey and East Hanover, New Jersey. A location in Staten Island, New York, opened in 2005 and closed on October 1, 2006. A location in Dorchester, Massachusetts (named "Kam Man Farmers Market"), opened in 2012 and closed April 22, 2014.

The first Chinese supermarket on the East Coast of the United States, Kam Man opened for business in 1972. Its main store is located at 200 Canal Street, between Mott Street and Mulberry Street, and carries such Asian mainstays as meats and produce, noodles, sauces, frozen foods, ginseng and various herbs. It also has an entire floor dedicated to cooking utensils, Asian ceramics and loose teas.

Its store in Edison, New Jersey, anchors a plaza that also includes a video rental shop, pharmacy, cell phone shop, travel agency, and a branch of the World Journal Bookstore.

Kam Man's expansion into Quincy, Massachusetts, has been the subject of several articles on the growth of New England's Asian American community. Opened in 2003, the Quincy store anchors a mall that includes 40 shops. Kam Man and other Asian-owned businesses are seen as filling a market space catering to affluent suburban Asian Americans unwilling to drive to traditional urban Chinatowns to shop. As of August 2007, the Quincy store was the largest Asian supermarket in New England.

== See also ==
- Chinese Americans in New York City
