= IBM Building, Honolulu =

Office building in Honolulu, Hawaiʻi

IBM Building
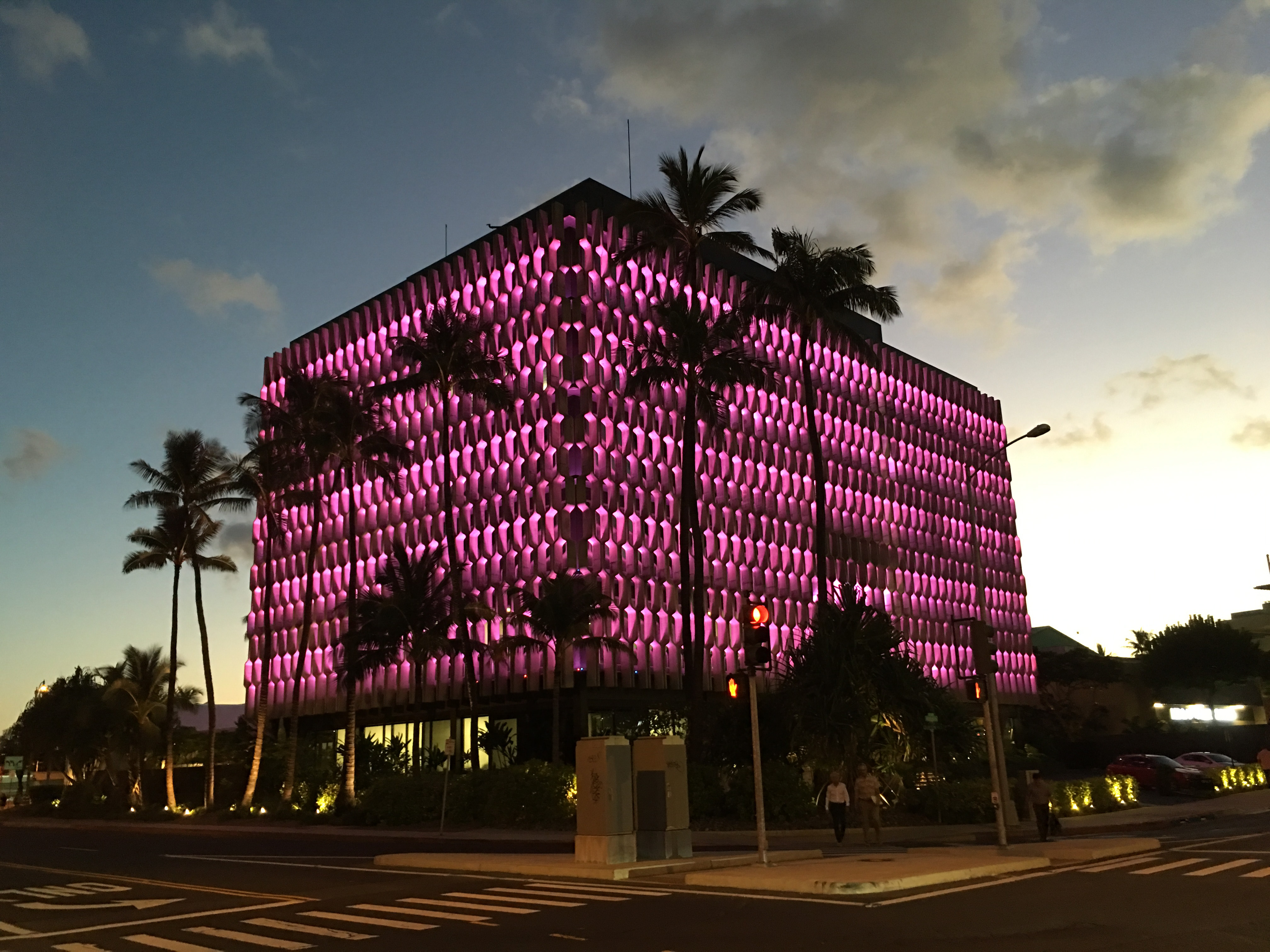
- IBM Building illuminated in pink (2016)
- Interactive map of the IBM Building area

General information
- Type: Office building
- Location: 1240 Ala Moana Boulevard, Honolulu
- Coordinates: 21°17′33″N 157°51′04″W
- Opened: 1962
- Renovated: 2014
- Cost: $1.5 million (equivalent to $16 million in 2025)
- Renovation cost: $24 million
- Client: IBM
- Owner: Howard Hughes Corporation

Technical details
- Material: Reinforced concrete
- Floor count: 6
- Floor area: 61,961 square feet (5,756.4 m^{2})

Design and construction
- Architect: Vladimir Ossipoff
- Main contractor: Hawaiian Dredging & Construction Company

Renovating team
- Architects: Woods Bagot and Ferraro Choi
- Main contractor: Jay Kadowaki Inc.; Albert C. Kobayashi Inc.

The IBM Building is an office building at 1240 Ala Moana Boulevard in Honolulu, Hawaiʻi. Designed by Vladimir Ossipoff, the building opened in 1962 as the Honolulu headquarters for American technology company IBM. It is presently owned by Howard Hughes Corporation, serving as a sales center for its surrounding Ward Village development.

Construction cost $1.5 million (equivalent to $16 million in 2025). The building was dedicated on October 10, 1962, in a ceremony attended by officials including William F. Quinn, who was Governor of Hawaii at the time. The roughly cube-shaped massing of the building is distinguished by the honeycomb structure of its concrete brise soleil, inspired by Polynesian culture and also intended to resemble the punched cards used in the computer industry at the time of its construction.

The IBM Building and surrounding area were purchased in 2002 by General Growth Properties, and the building was slated for demolition as part of a 2008 redevelopment plan. Public backlash led to its preservation after the planned development area was purchased by Howard Hughes Corporation, which expressed an intent to maintain the IBM Building's name and general appearance. The development company instead renovated the building to use as an information and sales center for Ward Village. It officially reopened in that capacity in 2014.

== History ==
=== Design and construction ===
On February 29, 1960, the Hawaii regional manager of IBM announced that the technology company would erect a new office building on Ala Moana Boulevard. The announcement projected that construction would cost between $800,000 and $1.5 million (equivalent to $16 million in 2025) and stated that the building would be either 5 or 7 stories tall when completed. It noted that planning would be completed after an architect and IBM representatives arrived from the contiguous United States, and that construction was scheduled to finish in March 1961.

On May 19, 1961, the regional manager stated that the planning process for the building had been finished and that construction would begin the following month. The announcement noted that a "sculptured ribbon-pattern concrete sun screen" would surround the glass curtain wall of the reinforced concrete building's upper floors, and that the building would contain 61,961 square feet (5,756.4 m^{2}) of space. The IBM Building was designed by architect Vladimir Ossipoff and built by contractor Hawaiian Dredging & Construction Company for Victoria Ward Limited. IBM planned to occupy the bottom two floors and Victoria Ward half of the sixth, while the remaining space would be leased to other tenants by IBM.

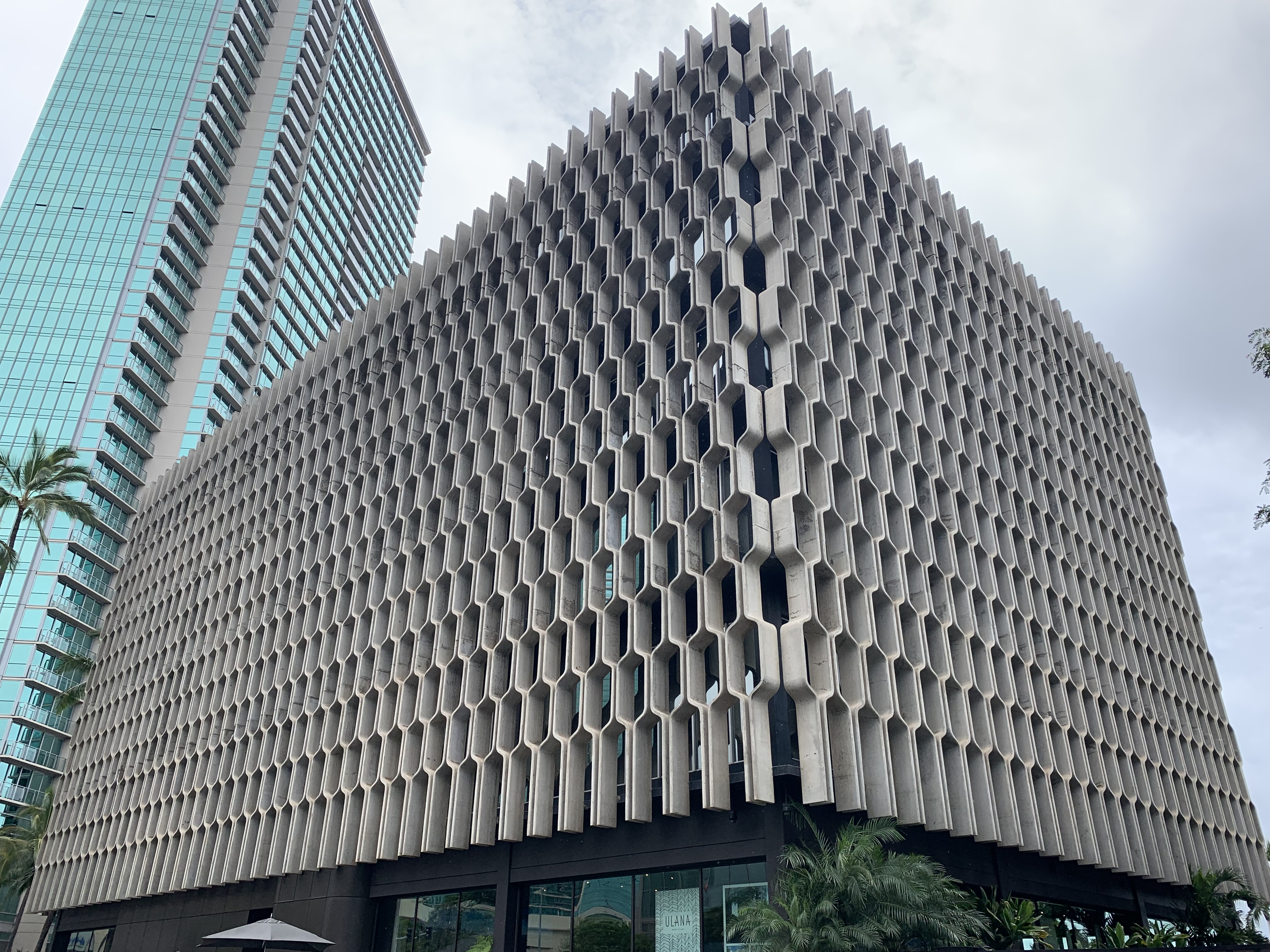
View from ground level of one corner of the IBM Building

Construction of the IBM Building, which began by July 1961, was the first part of a master plan for eastern Kakaʻako that Harland Bartholomew and Associates created for Victoria Ward Limited. In October 1961, a 20-year-old construction worker fell from the fifth floor of the building while moving a sawhorse from one scaffold to another and landed on a pile of lumber; he survived, but broke several bones in the fall.

According to Engineering News-Record, construction cost $1.5 million (equivalent to $16 million in 2025). It was built as part of IBM's US$18,000,000 (equivalent to about $191,584,000 in 2025) effort to build imaginative offices around the world. The magazine praised the cheap construction in an October 1962 article, attributing it to IBM's planning and direction of the process.

=== Opening ===
The IBM Building opened in 1962 at 1240 Ala Moana Boulevard as the Honolulu headquarters for IBM. The building was dedicated on October 10, 1962, in a ceremony attended by various corporate and military officials as well as members of the public. Then-Governor of Hawaii William F. Quinn attended and spoke at the event, characterizing the building as "a gratifying demonstration of one company's success in years past and faith in the future of the mid-Pacific area". Also attending were Rev. Abraham Akaka and the president of IBM's Federal Systems Division.

Though the IBM Building's appearance was initially criticized by Hawaii residents for its perceived austerity and for not fitting into the aesthetic of Hawaii, it became more popular over time. Its simple design gained various accolades in the architectural community, including a 1964 honorable mention from the Hawaii chapter of the American Institute of Architects. Its landscaping was recognized with the 1964 Beautification Award from the Honolulu Chamber of Commerce.

=== Changes in ownership ===
In April 2002, General Growth Properties (GGP) made a $250 million (equivalent to $448 million in 2025) bid to acquire Victoria Ward Limited and its 65 acres (26 ha) of properties in Kakaʻako, including the IBM Building. GGP was additionally the owner of Ala Moana Center, a major competitor of the Ward developments in Kakaʻako. The sale was finalized the following month.

In 2008, GGP proposed demolishing the IBM Building as part of a redevelopment plan, intending to create a new mixed-use "urban village" in the area. The building was instead preserved due to public backlash. Howard Hughes Corporation purchased the redevelopment area from GGP in 2010. In October 2011, Howard Hughes announced a revised master plan for the area; by February 2012, the corporation expressed an intent to maintain the IBM Building's name and general appearance.

=== Renovation ===
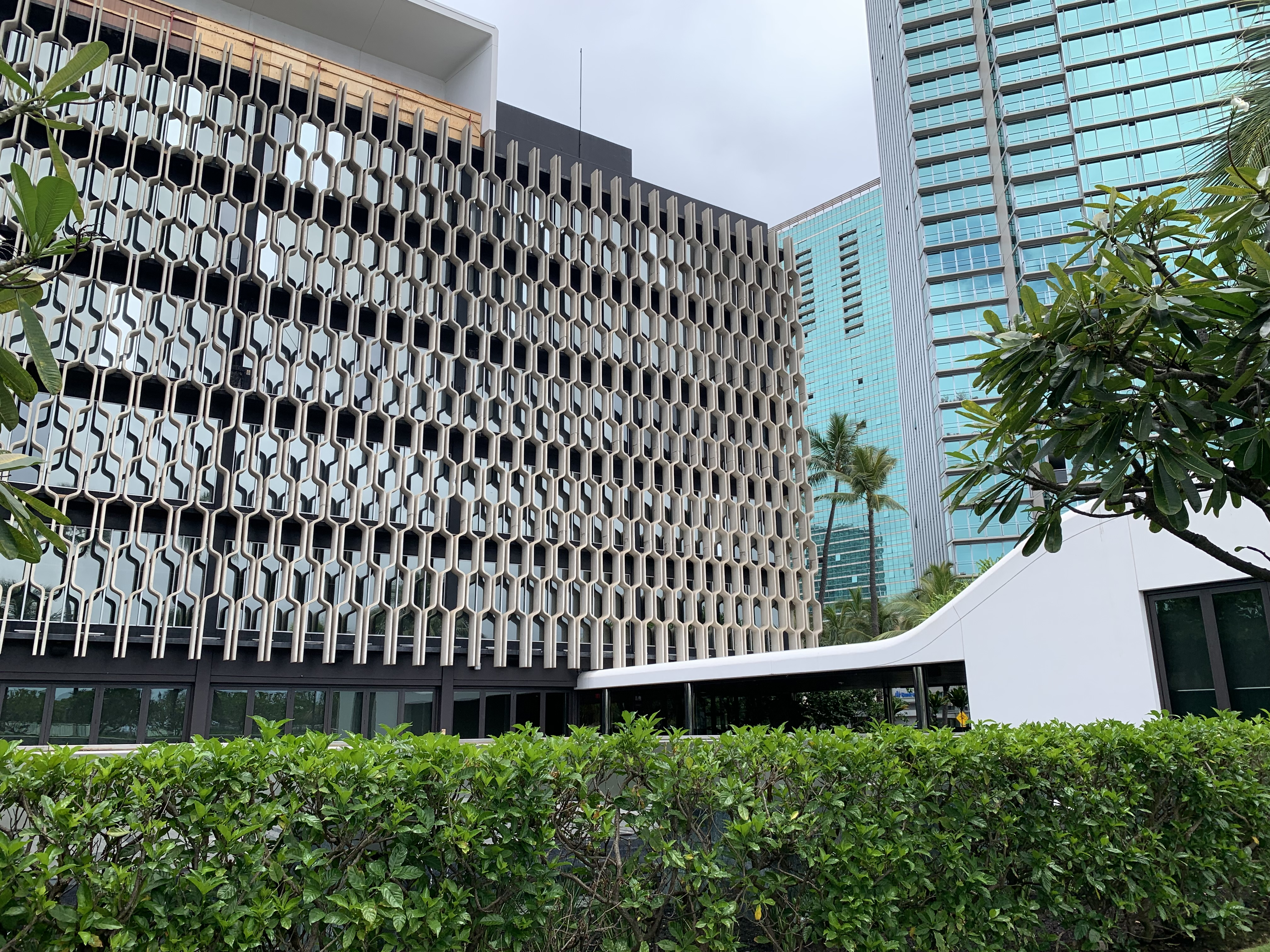
The 2014 addition, painted white, protrudes from the IBM Building

Woods Bagot and Ferraro Choi designed a renovation to make the building a sales center for Howard Hughes Corporation, as part of the development company's master plan for the surrounding Ward Village development. Contractors Jay Kadowaki Inc. and Albert C. Kobayashi Inc. carried out the renovation, and the building officially reopened on January 25, 2014. The construction cost $24,000,000 and won the Display category at INSIDE Festival in 2015.

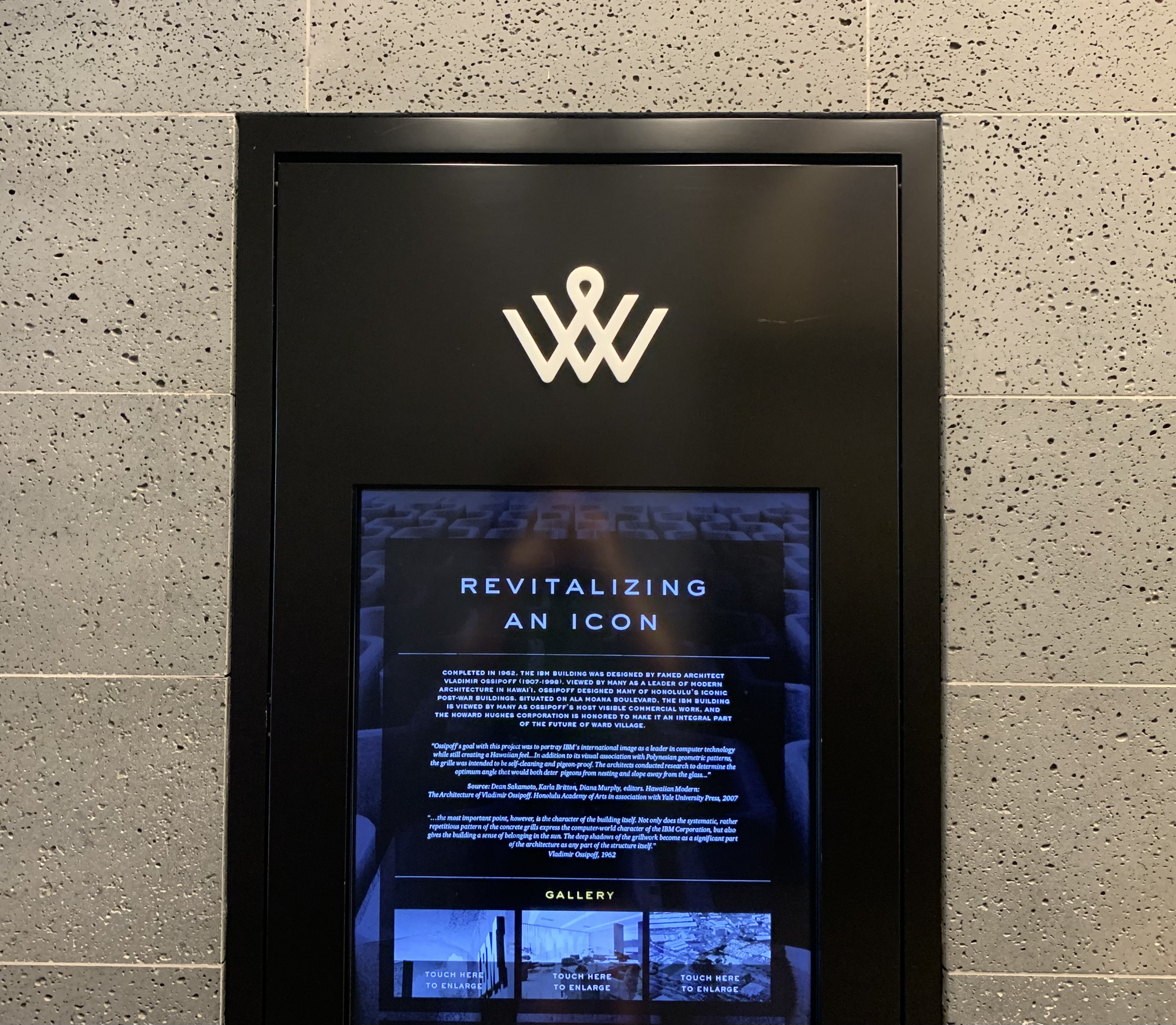
A digital information board in the IBM Building shows a display about the building's history

Howard Hughes built model units in the building for several of its nearby condominiums. The company also utilized the second, third, sixth, and seventh floors while maintaining an information center on the ground floor. The information center was created by completely redesigning the ground floor and replacing walls with windows on all four sides. Solomon Enos was commissioned to paint a mural in the space, and designed an installation depicting Hawaiian goddess Keaomelemele. The parking lot was replaced with a courtyard for outdoor gatherings, including a water feature. A cube-like structure was built onto one side of the building and the rooftop lanai was extended. These changes were criticized by Ossipoff's former partner Sid Snyder as "unsympathetic to the architecture of the building" – Snyder elaborated that he disliked the bright white color and location of the addition – and were also critiqued by the architect's daughter Valerie Ossipoff.

=== Post-renovation ===
In 2018, Howard Hughes Corporation announced plans to move remote workers into the building and notified tenants on the fourth floor that they would be taking it over when leases expired at the end of that year. These tenants included IBM, which maintained its last remaining offices in the building on that floor. Honolulu Civil Beat observed that it was unclear whether "IBM Building" would remain the official name of the building once it was no longer occupied by IBM; a Howard Hughes executive declined to comment. In 2019, IBM vacated the building completely, and the sign reading "IBM" was removed from the roof.

== Architecture ==
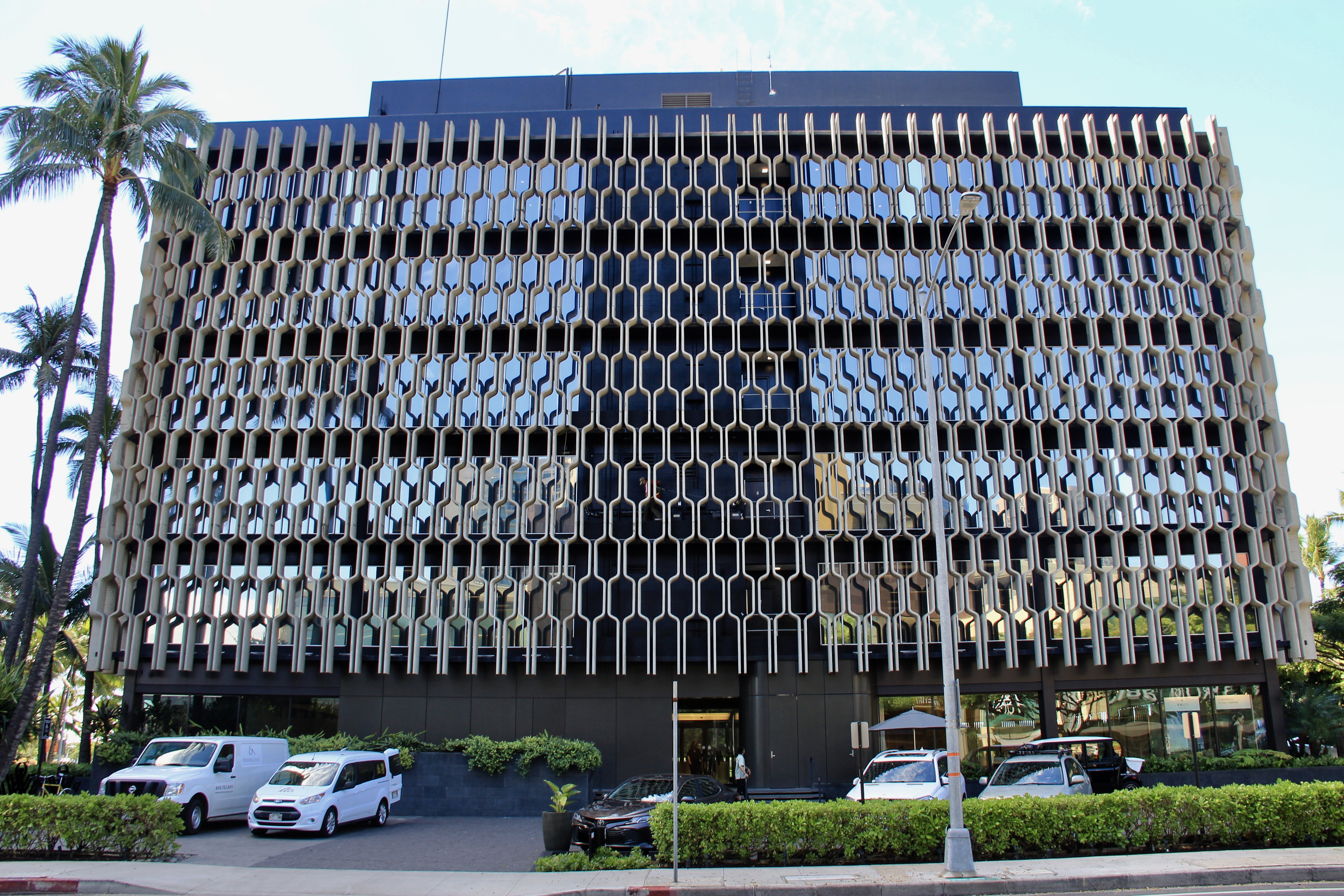
Front view of the IBM Building

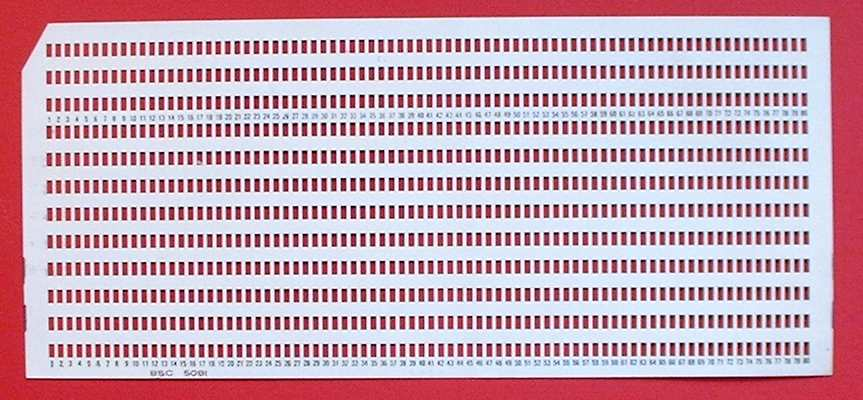
IBM punched card from the early 1970s

The six-story IBM Building, which also has rooftop space referred to as a seventh floor, has cuboid massing. It has a concrete brise soleil with a distinctive honeycomb structure. This facade, which was assembled from 1,360 precast pieces of concrete, intended to resemble the punched cards which were used in the computer industry at the time of the building's construction. Architect Vladimir Ossipoff also drew inspiration from Polynesian culture while designing the facade. The angles of the brise soleil were intended to block sunlight, prevent water from pooling, and discourage pigeon nesting without blocking views from the offices. Ossipoff himself described the grille as a key aspect of the building:

Not only does the systematic, rather repetitious pattern of the concrete grille express the computer-world character of the IBM Corp., but also gives it a sense of belonging in the sun. The deep shadows of the grillwork become as significant a part of the architecture as any part of the structure itself.

— Vladimir Ossipoff, "Building Designed for the Sun", Honolulu Star-Bulletin, Feb. 6, 1966

The building itself is set back from the road, and Ossipoff used berms to make the parking lot less visible. Stairways, elevators, and utilities are clustered at the building's center to reduce obstructions of the office space.

== Significance ==
The IBM Building has been recognized as a key example of the tropical modernism architectural style that was popular at the time of its construction. Vladimir Ossipoff was a key figure in the style's development. In 2008, architect and Yale University Director of Exhibitions Dean Sakamoto described the building as a Honolulu landmark and a marker of the passing of time, comparing it to Aloha Tower and the Hawaii Convention Center. Jeff Nishi, another architect, characterized it as an example of Ossipoff's versatility as an architect.

== See also ==
- Hawai‘i Preparatory Academy
- Liljestrand House
