= Victoria Ward =

Victoria Ward, Ward of Victoria, or variation, may refer to:

== Places ==
- Victoria Ward (Ottawa), the civic ward of Victoria in the city of Ottawa, Ontario, Canada
- Victoria (Hackney ward), a civic ward in the London Borough of Hackney, Merseyside, England, UK
- Victoria (Sefton ward), a civic ward in the Metropolitan Borough of Sefton, England, UK
- Victoria, a ward of Newbury, Berkshire, England, UK
- Victoria, London, England, UK; a former ward of the Westminster Metropolitan Borough
- Borough of Victoria, Lower North Shore, Sydney, New South Wales, Australia; formerly the Ward of Victoria

== People ==
- Victoria Ward (actress) (1939–1992), British actress
- Vicky Ward (born 1969, as Victoria Penelope Jane Ward), British-American journalist
- Vicki Ward (born 1969), Australian politician of Victoria state
- Victoria Ward (1846-1935), a champion of Hawai‘i and descended from aliʻi; the namesake of the shopping center Ward Centers

== Other uses ==
- Ward Centers, formerly Victoria Ward Centers, a shopping center at Kaka'ako, Honolulu, Hawai'i, USA
- Victoria Ward Limited, the operating company for Ward Centers
- Victoria Ward, Balmain Hospital Main Building, Balmain, Inner West Council, Sydney, New South Wales, Australia; a hospital ward in a listed building

== See also ==
- Victor Ward (1923–2011), Canadian miner
