= Jerry Colangelo =

American basketball executive and coach and sports executive and owner (born 1939)

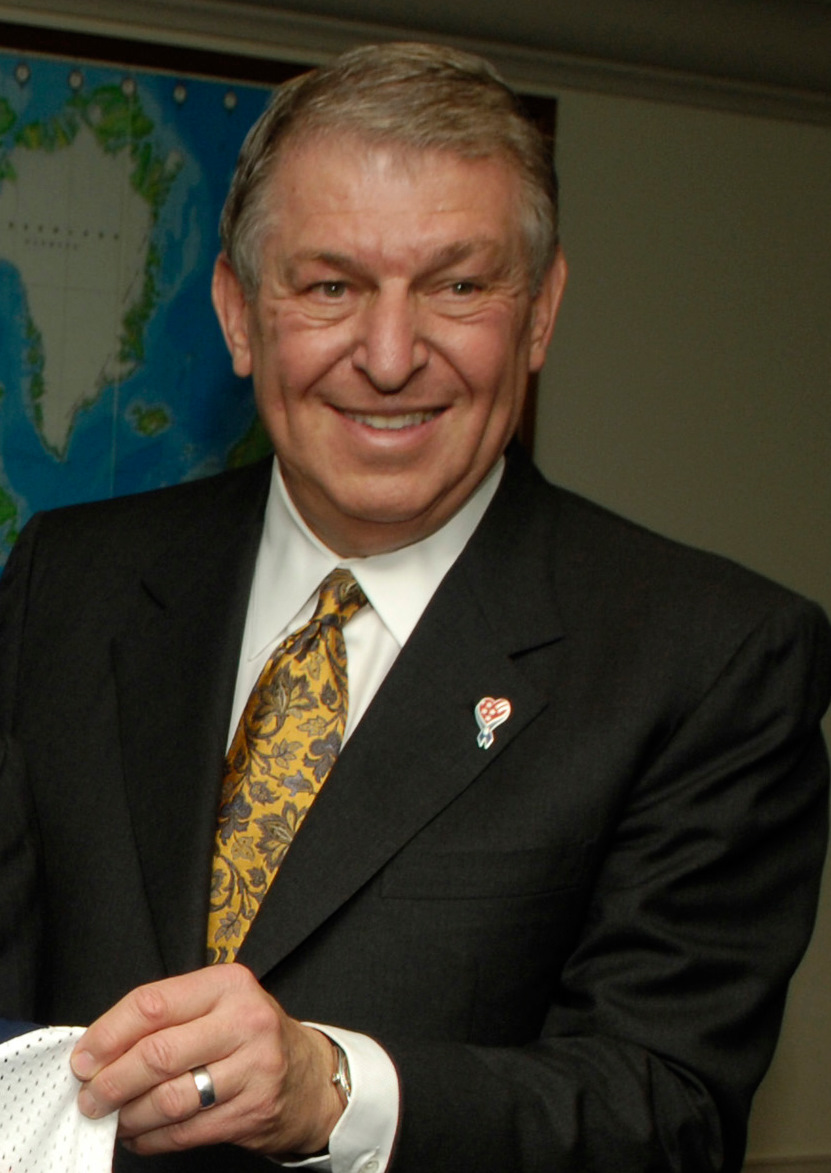
- Colangelo in 2010

Personal information
- Born: November 20, 1939 (age 86) Chicago Heights, Illinois, U.S.

Career information
- High school: Bloom Township (Chicago Heights, Illinois)
- College: Illinois (1960–1962)
- Position: Guard
- Number: 23

Career highlights
- Coach Wooden "Keys to Life" Award (2000); As player: 2× Big Ten honorable mention (1961, 1962); No. 23 jersey honored by Illinois Fighting Illini; As executive: 4× NBA Executive of the Year (1977, 1982, 1990, 1994)
- Basketball Hall of Fame
Medals
Managing Director for United States
men's national basketball team
FIBA World Championship
Gold medal – first place	2010 Turkey	Team
Gold medal – first place	2014 Spain	Team
Bronze medal – third place	2006 Japan	Team
FIBA Americas Championship
Gold medal – first place	2007 Las Vegas	Team

Jerry Colangelo (born November 20, 1939) is an American businessman and sports executive. He formerly owned the Phoenix Suns of the NBA, the Phoenix Mercury of the WNBA, the Arizona Sandsharks of the Continental Indoor Soccer League, the Arizona Rattlers of the Arena Football League, and the Arizona Diamondbacks of Major League Baseball. He was also instrumental in the relocation of the original Winnipeg Jets team in the NHL to Phoenix to become the Phoenix Coyotes (later renamed to the Arizona Coyotes). In 2014, Grand Canyon University renamed its Christian based school of business after Colangelo, replacing Ken Blanchard's namesake. From December 2015 to April 2016, Colangelo served as chairman of basketball operations for the Philadelphia 76ers, before serving as a special advisor to the team until December 2018.

He became the youngest general manager in professional sports in 1968 after being hired to that position by the Phoenix Suns. He holds the distinction of the second-longest tenure running an NBA franchise, exceeded only by that of Red Auerbach of the Boston Celtics.

In 2002, According to a KTAR interview Jerry Colangelo became an owner of 37,000 acres in Buckeye, AZ, in 2002, a master-planned site known as Douglas Ranch. The property was later acquired by The Howard Hughes Corporation in 2021 and renamed Teravalis.

In 2005, Colangelo was named director of USA Basketball, whose team represented the United States in the 2008 Beijing Olympics and 2010 FIBA World Championship. Since 2009, he has served as Chairman of the Naismith Memorial Basketball Hall of Fame. Colangelo also serves as Chairman of the National Italian American Foundation (NIAF), a nonprofit nonpartisan educational foundation that promotes Italian-American culture and heritage.

== Early life ==
Colangelo was born and raised in Chicago Heights, Illinois, to an Italian-American working class family. He played basketball and baseball for Bloom Township High School. Colangelo enrolled at the University of Kansas, but transferred to the University of Illinois after prospective teammate Wilt Chamberlain left. He played basketball for the Illinois Fighting Illini, earned All-Big Ten honors, and captained the Illini as a senior. He was later inducted into the Illinois Basketball Hall of Fame. Colangelo also played two years of baseball at Illinois. In 1962, he graduated from the University of Illinois with a degree in physical education.

In his autobiography, How You Play the Game, Colangelo tells of working at the House of Charles, a tuxedo rental shop in Chicago Heights, after graduating from college.

== Basketball ==
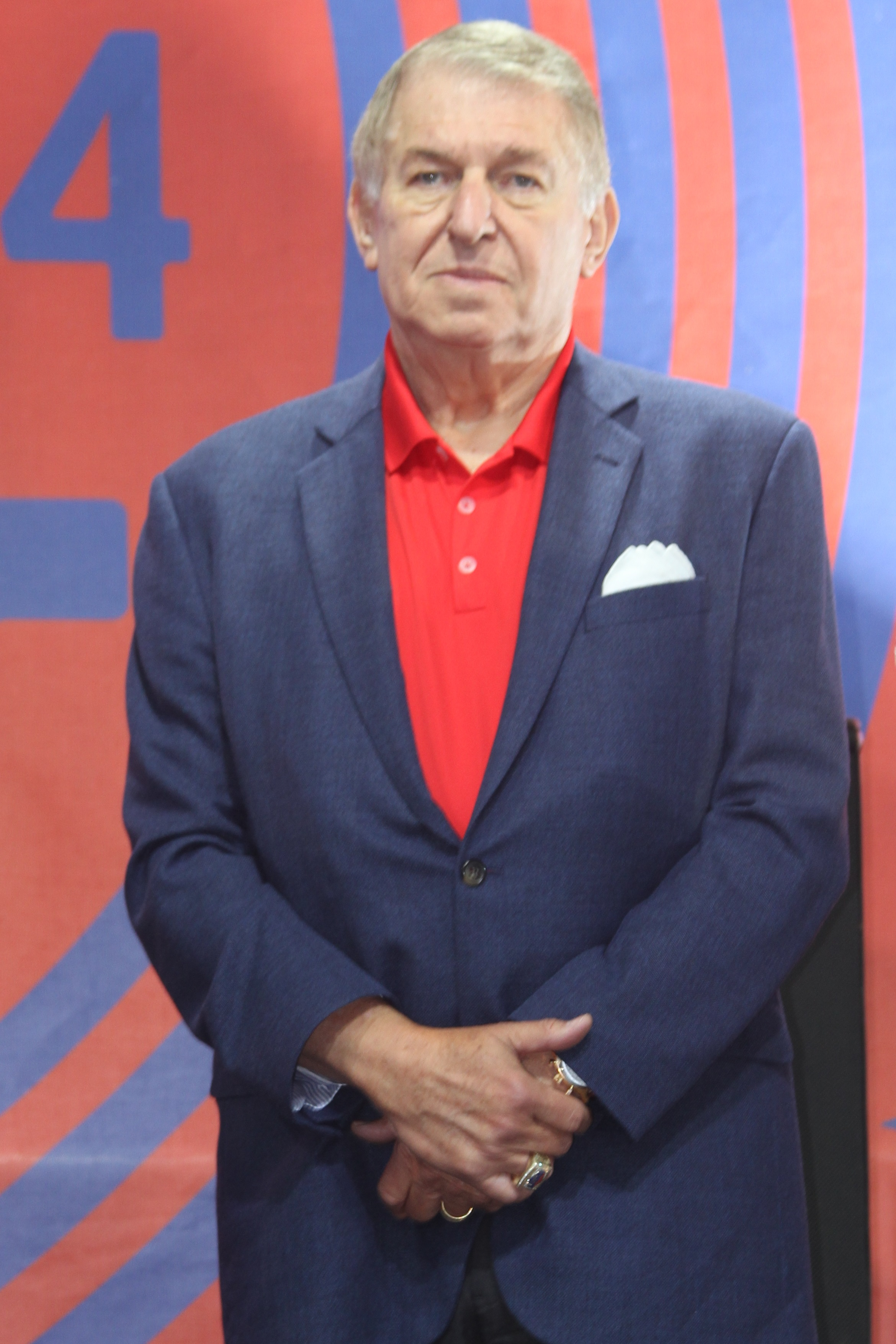
Colangelo at the 2014 World Basketball Festival

Colangelo began his sports career in 1966 in professional basketball with the Chicago Bulls. He worked as a marketing director, scout, and assistant to the president of the team. In 1968, he left the Bulls and was hired as the first general manager of the expansion team, the Phoenix Suns. He was the youngest general manager in professional sports. When he and his family left for Arizona, he had $200 in his wallet.

Colangelo got off to an unlucky start, losing a 1969 coin flip to the Milwaukee Bucks for the rights to UCLA phenom Lew Alcindor (who became Kareem Abdul-Jabbar). The Suns were competitive during most of the 1970s, making it to the NBA Finals in 1976, but losing to the Boston Celtics in six games. Colangelo had two stints as head coach during that decade, compiling a record of 59 wins and 60 losses.

Throughout most of the 1980s, Colangelo's Suns faced difficulties. Some players, including 1976 NBA Finals player Garfield Heard, were involved in an infamous drug scandal, young center Nick Vanos died in a 1987 plane crash, and, from 1985 through 1988, the Suns failed to qualify for the playoffs. Colangelo assembled a group of investors that bought the Suns in late 1987, in the wake of the drug scandal. He subsequently made a trade for Kevin Johnson in 1987.

The Suns made one of the biggest turnarounds in NBA history in 1988–89, nearly doubling their win total (from 28 wins to 55) and making the first of 13 straight playoff appearances. In 1989, Colangelo was an essential part of the group that provided financial backing to build America West Arena. In 1992, Colangelo traded Jeff Hornacek, Tim Perry, and Andrew Lang to the Philadelphia 76ers for Charles Barkley. The trade proved to be productive for the Suns, and they reached the NBA Finals for the second time in 1993, this time losing to the Chicago Bulls starring Michael Jordan in six games. Barkley's relationship with Colangelo, however, grew sour over the years, and in 1996, he was traded to the Houston Rockets.

Throughout his time with the Suns, Colangelo would win four different NBA Executive of the Year honors with the team. It would stand to be the most honors for an executive of one team in the NBA. He eventually turned over the Suns' presidency to his son Bryan, who later left the organization to become general manager of the Toronto Raptors. Bryan ended up winning two NBA Executive of the Year honors: one with Phoenix and one with Toronto two seasons later.

On December 7, 2015, Colangelo decided to return to the NBA to become the new chairman of basketball operations for the Philadelphia 76ers, as well as special adviser to the team's managing partner. On April 7, 2016, Colangelo's son, Bryan, took on the role of general manager and president of basketball operations for the 76ers after their former president and general manager, Sam Hinkie, resigned from his position before end of the 2015–16 season due to irreconcilable differences with Jerry. The move reunited the Colangelos for the first time since 2004 with the Phoenix Suns. Colangelo stepped down as chairman of basketball operations following the hiring of his son, but he retained his role as special adviser to the managing partner. Just before his son's later resignation from the position of general manager, Colangelo attempted to save Bryan's job by threatening to damage the team's NBA relationships. On July 30, 2018, Colangelo said in an interview that he would leave the 76ers by the end of 2018.

In July 2026, he announced a bid to acquire an NBA franchise in Las Vegas under its name "Jacks." In September 2026, Colangelo and Bill Foley are narrowed down to three group finalist, along with Bill and Nancy Walton Laurie; and a joint bid by Steve Apostolopoulos and Marc Lasry.

== Additional sports activities ==
Colangelo has been involved in many professional sports teams in Arizona.

=== Baseball ===
While in Chicago for a Suns game, Colangelo attended a Chicago Cubs baseball game at Wrigley Field. Soon thereafter he decided to inquire to Major League Baseball about bringing an expansion team to Arizona. He assembled a group of investors in 1994 to buy a franchise, a year ahead of MLB's proposed expansion selection meetings. In 1995, Colangelo's group was granted an expansion team, the Arizona Diamondbacks.

The Diamondbacks began playing in 1998. For his new baseball club, Colangelo hired Joe Garagiola, Jr. as general manager. He next brought in Buck Showalter coming off a successful stint as manager of the New York Yankees. Showalter and Yankees owner George Steinbrenner did not agree to a contract extension, so Colangelo quickly hired Showalter as future manager of the Diamondbacks. These hirings proved to be instrumental to the expansion franchise's quick success. Key acquisitions made by Garagiola included the signing of Randy Johnson in 1999 and a trade for Curt Schilling in 2000 from the Philadelphia Phillies. They were co-MVPs of the 2001 World Series when the Diamondbacks beat the Yankees in seven games. As of 2025, this is the only major men's professional sports championship for the Phoenix area.

The Diamondbacks had gone into significant debt to build the 2001 champions. For example, he asked 12 of the highest-paid players to defer their salaries for four years and repay them over eight years. The ensuing debt came back to haunt the Diamondbacks in 2004. Only three years after winning the World Series and two years after winning a third division title in four years, the Diamondbacks never recovered from a slow start. They ultimately finished 51–111, the worst record in baseball and still the worst in franchise history.

By then, Colangelo was gone. He was forced to resign as managing general partner in the summer of 2004 and subsequently sold his interest. Ken Kendrick succeeded him as managing general partner, while Jeff Moorad became CEO and operating head of the franchise.

In an interview with USA Today, Colangelo defended his approach to building the Diamondbacks, saying that he was only trying to build a winning team. He contrasted his approach with that of the Diamondbacks' expansion brethren, the Tampa Bay Devil Rays, who at the time had finished in either last or next-to-last every season and would not have a winning season until 2008. He claimed that the plan only backfired when the economy worsened and he didn't get as much from baseball's central fund as anticipated.

=== Women's basketball ===
In 1997, Colangelo's team in the Women's National Basketball Association, the Phoenix Mercury, began playing. The following year, the Mercury reached the WNBA Finals but lost to the Houston Comets.

=== Arena football ===
In 1992, Colangelo founded the Arena Football League's Arizona Rattlers and owned them until 2005. Under Colangelo's guidance, the Rattlers won Arena Bowl championships in 1994 and 1997. They were also one of the AFL's most successful franchises, also losing in the Arena Bowl in 2002, 2003, and 2004.

=== Hockey ===
Following the demise of the proposed move of the Winnipeg Jets to Minneapolis, Colangelo was involved in bringing the National Hockey League (NHL) to Arizona, successfully convincing the team's ownership to relocate the franchise to the area as the Phoenix Coyotes in 1996. At the time, the move made Phoenix one of 13 metropolitan areas with franchises in all four major North American professional sports leagues. The Coyotes played within city limits from 1996 to 2003, then moved to the Phoenix suburb of Glendale and played there from 2003 to 2022, and then finally in the Phoenix suburb of Tempe at Arizona State University's facilities prior to the team's hockey assets sale to Utah-based group in 2024.

== Exit from sports ==
In April 2004, Colangelo sold the Suns, Mercury and Rattlers to an investment group headed by San Diego, California businessman, Tucson, Arizona native Robert Sarver for $401 million. In August 2004, Colangelo sold his controlling interest in the Arizona Diamondbacks to a group of investors led by Jeff Moorad.

== Other interests ==
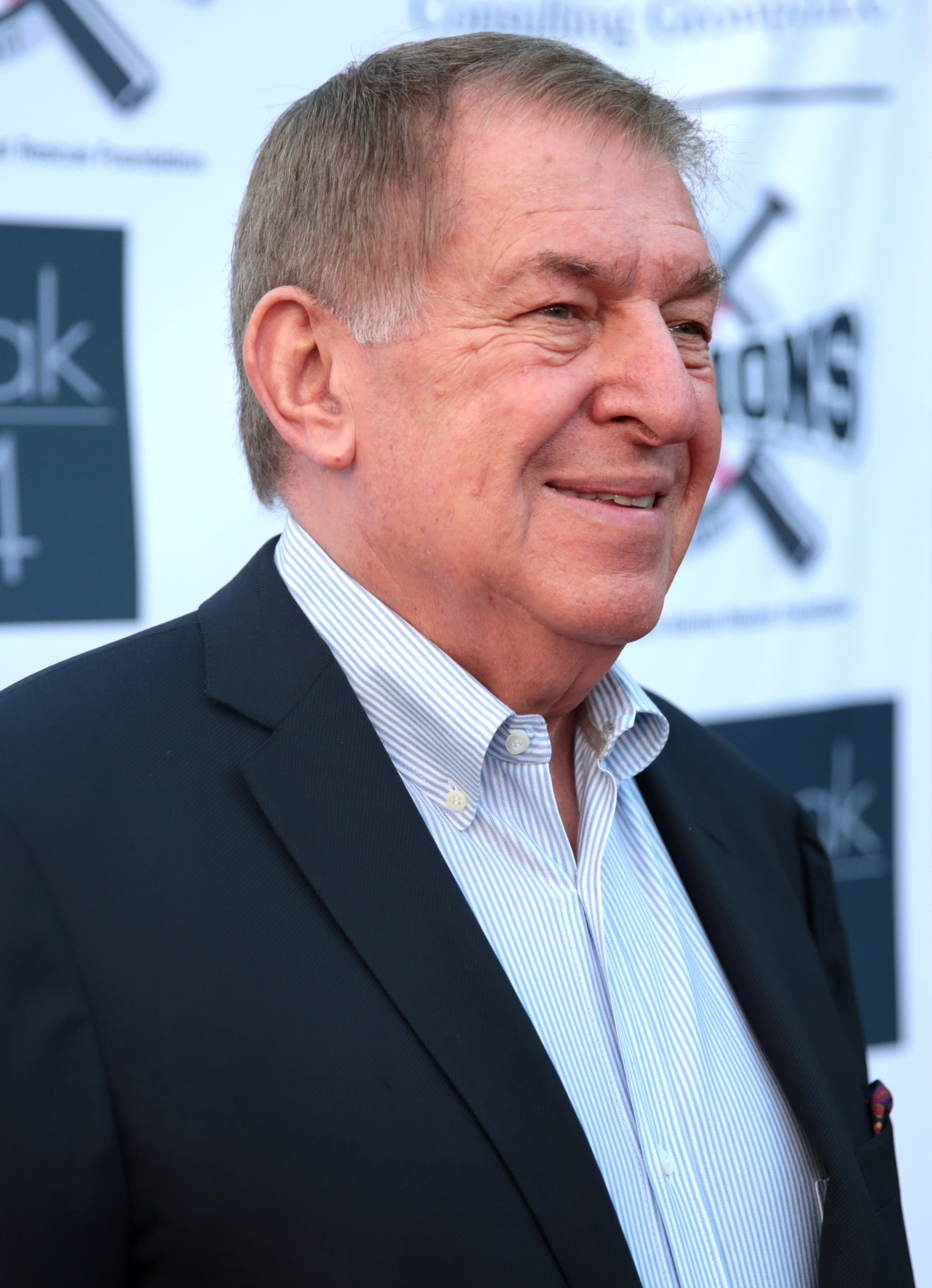
Colangelo at a fundraiser hosted by Tony La Russa in Phoenix, Arizona

In 2003, Jerry Colangelo was part of an investment group planning development in Buckeye, Arizona. They planned a 300,000+ residence development called Douglas Ranch and a smaller 7,000 acres (30 km^{2}) development called Trillium. The Howard Hughes Corp. later developed Douglas Ranch and partnered with Colangelo's investment group on Trillium.

Colangelo's investment group, JDM Partners, purchased the bankrupt Wigwam Resort in Litchfield Park, Arizona in 2008.

In 2011, Colangelo assisted in creating Grand Canyon University's Colangelo School of Sports Business and served as an advisor. On September 25, 2014, the university announced their college of business would be renamed Colangelo College of Business.

== Awards ==
Colangelo has been named the NBA's Executive of the Year four times (1976, 1981, 1989, 1993). He is an honorary member of the Marchegiana Society of his hometown, Chicago Heights, Illinois. A street in that city bears his name.

In 1994, Colangelo received the Golden Plate Award of the American Academy of Achievement.

On May 9, 2002, Colangelo received an honorary degree from Arizona State University.

On April 4, 2004, Colangelo was elected to the Naismith Basketball Hall of Fame.

On November 4, 2007, Colangelo was inducted into the Phoenix Suns Ring of Honor at the halftime of a Suns game against the Cleveland Cavaliers.

He is the National Leadership Director of the National Italian American Sports Hall of Fame and is also a Hall of Fame inductee. It is located in the Colangelo Building on Taylor Street in Little Italy, Chicago.

On Friday, October 21, 2016, Colangelo was honored by Phoenix Rotary 100, Arizona's first Rotary Club, the prestigious John D. Driggs Outstanding Career Achievement and Community Service Award.

On Saturday, May 18, 2019, The Lincoln Academy of Illinois granted Colangelo the Order of Lincoln award, the highest honor bestowed by the State of Illinois.

== Personal life ==
Colangelo is a Christian and has spoken about his faith saying, "The first priority in life is to have that relationship with Jesus Christ. So your faith is number one. ... God [has] a plan for my life. You know, the way I've tried to live my life is I have this platform, it was given to me by the Lord. And He's blessed me with a lot of things. And someday I'm going to be held accountable with what I did with those things."

Colangelo is married to Joan, whom he met on a blind date while at college. They have four children: Kathy Holcombe, Kristen Young, Mandie Colangelo, and Bryan Colangelo. Bryan had been president of the Phoenix Suns when his father was part of the ownership group, and rejoined his father with the Philadelphia 76ers from 2016 to 2018.

== Head coaching record ==
Team	Year	G	W	L	W–L%	Finish	PG	PW	PL	PW–L%	Result
Phoenix	1969–70	44	24	20	.545	4th in Western	7	3	4	.429	Lost in division semifinals
Phoenix	1972–73	75	35	40	.467	3rd in Pacific	—	—	—	—	Missed playoffs
Career		119	59	60	.496		7	3	4	.429	

== Works ==
- Colangelo, Jerry; Sherman, Len (1999). How You Play the Game: Lessons for Life from the Billion-Dollar Business of Sports. AMACOM. ISBN 978-0814404881.
