= Ward Village =

- Neighborhood
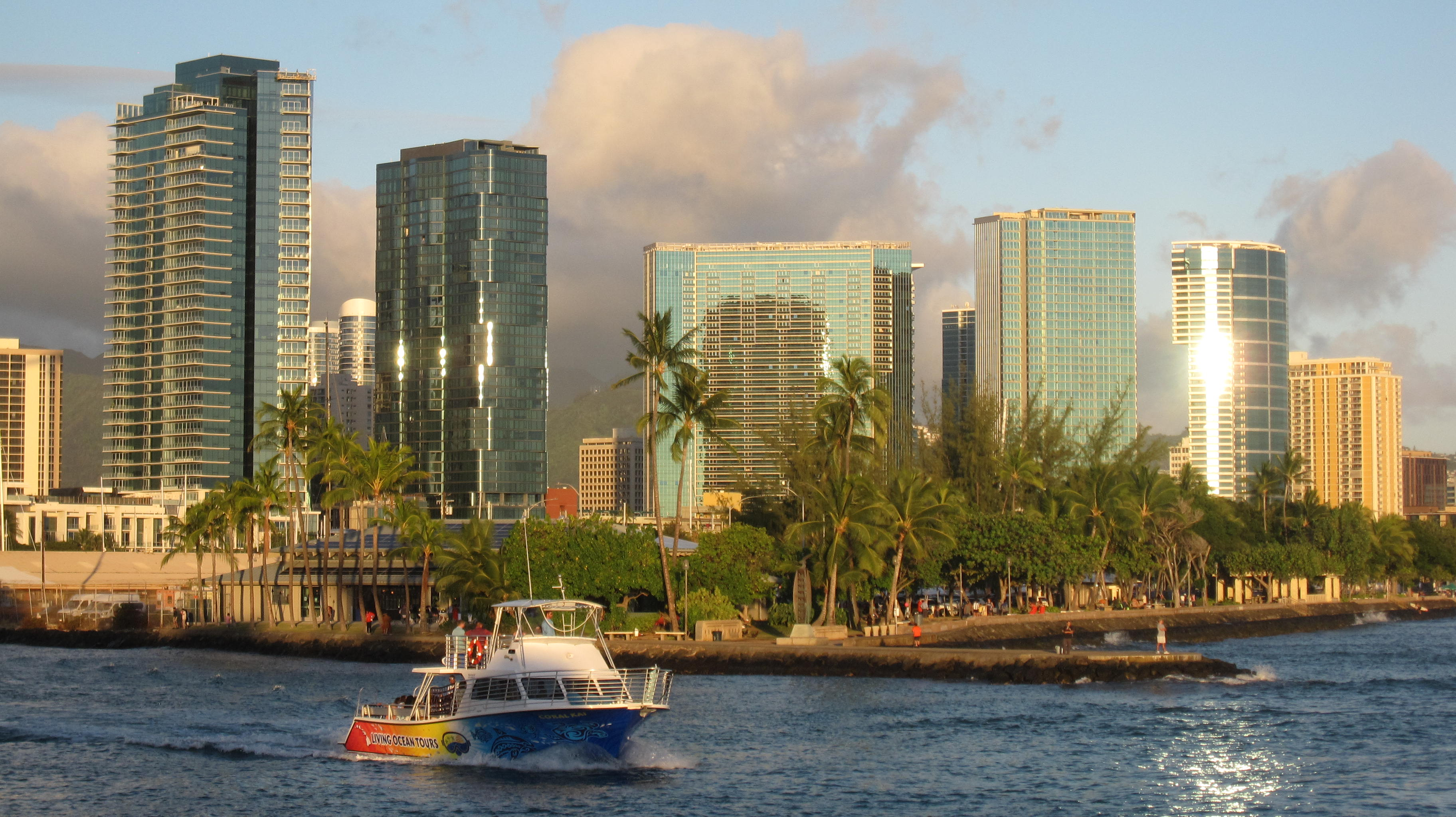
- Ward Village towers Waiea and Anaha (Left)
- Interactive map of Ward Village
- Coordinates: 21°17′48″N 157°51′20″W
- Website: www.wardvillage.com

Ward Village is a 60-acre (24 ha), master-planned community in the Kaka'ako district of Honolulu. It is being developed by The Howard Hughes Corporation. Once completed, this beachfront development will have luxury residences, retail stores, entertainment venues, pedestrian friendly streets, a Skyline rail station, and public open space.

== The Development process ==
Over the course of the next decade, The Howard Hughes Corporation plans to add more than one million square feet of retail shops and 4,000 high-rise residential opportunities. To ensure the development of Ward Village honors the history of Honolulu and Hawaii, The Howard Hughes Corporation engages in thorough and ongoing consultation with the O'ahu Island Burial Counsel, the State Historic Preservation Division, the Office of Hawaiian Affairs, the Ala Moana/Kaka'ako Neighborhood Board, the Hawaii Community Development Authority, the City and County of Honolulu, tenants, neighbors and recognized cultural descendants.

=== Phase one development ===
Phase one of the project featured the development of two residential condominium towers—Waiea and Anaha—as well as a new master plan information center and residential sales gallery in the IBM Building. The towers were completed in 2017 and 2018 respectively.

==== Waiea ====
Waiea features 171 residences, including 10 villas and 10 penthouses. The tower is designed by James K.M. Cheng and Hawaii-based Rob Iopa of WCIT Architecture. The interiors of Waiea are created by interior designer, Tony Ingrao and the landscaping is designed by SWA Group. Waiea once had a Nobu's restaurant upon completion which closed and is now a Jinya Ramen Bar.

==== Anaha ====
The Anaha tower includes 311 residences, including 73 flats and townhomes. Anaha is collaboratively designed by architecture and design firms Solomon Cordwell Buenz and Ben Woo Architects. The interiors are designed by designer Woods Bagot and the exterior spaces are created by landscape designer Surface Design of San Francisco. A Merriman's restaurant anchors this building.

==== IBM Building ====
In 2008, a redevelopment plan slated the IBM Building for demolition, but public backlash led to its preservation instead. The building was renovated and repurposed by Woods Bagot to be a sales center for Howard Hughes Corporation, as part of the development company's master plan for the surrounding Ward Village development, officially reopening in 2014. Howard Hughes built model units in the building for several of their nearby condominiums, and also utilized it as office space; it occupied the second, third, sixth and seventh floors while maintaining an information center on the first.

=== Changes seen in Ward Village ===
Here are the changes in Ward Village's urban fabric seen throughout its development.

In 2016, The old Pier 1 Imports was demolished to make way for Anaha. In 2017, the Office Depot/Nordstrom Rack was demolished to make way for Aeo/Whole Foods. In late 2017, the 1970s Ward Warehouse was mostly demolished to make way for Gateway Towers. At the same time, The Marukai Ward store and surrounding warehouses was shut down and was demolished to make way for the public Victoria Ward park, and the A'alii, Kōʻula, and The Park Ward Village condos. In 2019, the Ward Plaza was demolished to make way for The Launiu, In 2021, The Ward Gateway center was demolished to make way for The Park Ward Village, Mahana, and the future Skyline Station. In 2024; the Ward Warehouse parking garage was finally demolished to make way for Kalae. The 1980s Ward Centre closed in June 2026 and will be demolished to make way for Melia and Ilima in late 2026.

==== Gateway Towers ====
Gateway Towers was designed by the firm of Richard Meier, and was to feature 236 units. These were going to be the most luxurious condos in the neighborhood, and were to feature unique considerations such as a bridge linking the two towers.

Gateway towers would be redesigned due to engineering problems, as well as the need for a bigger Victoria Ward Park. This would result in one of the two towers being scrapped and the first one already sold was redesigned to become the Victoria Place condo.

=== Phase two developments ===
Phase two of the project includes the Ae'o tower, Ke Kilohana, and A'ali'i.

==== Ae'o ====
Ae'o is a condo north of the Ward Entertainment Center and was designed by Bohlin Cywinski Jackson, and it consists of 466 residences. A flagship Whole Foods Market anchors the building.

==== Ke Kilohana ====
Ke Kilohana is a affordable-housing condo that was designed by AC Martin in partnership with Honolulu based CDS International. There are 424 residences, 375 were reserved for qualified Hawaii residents. A Longs Drugs store anchors the building.

==== A'ali'i ====
Unlike the more luxury focused developments of Ward Village, A'ali'i is largely affordable micro-units, 751 in total.

=== Phase three developments ===
Phase three of the project includes Kōʻula, Victoria Ward Park, and the Victoria Place condo.

==== Kōʻula ====
Kōʻula a luxury condo that is designed by Studio Gang and is south of A'ali'i and west of the Ward Entertainment Center. There are 566 units in total. A shopping complex is located on the bottom floor of the condominiums, named the Kōʻula Shops. Notable tenants include Happy Lemon and Dean & DeLuca. A Cotti Coffee shop was announced in 2024.

==== Victoria Place ====
Victoria Place is an ultra-luxury condo that replaced the original Gateway Towers project. This condo has 350 units and was designed by Solomon Cordwell Buenz.

==== Victoria Ward Park ====
Victoria Ward Park is a park that goes from A'ali'i condo to the Ala Moana Beach Park. This park also replaced the cancelled Gateway Tower 2 and includes a pedestrian bridge over Ala Moana Boulevard.

=== Phase Four developments ===
Phase four of the project consists of The Park Ward Village, The Launiu, Kalae, and Ulana.

==== The Park Ward Village ====
The Park Ward Village will be a luxury condo that will be located across from Kōʻula and it is designed by Francesco Mozzati. This condo will consist of 545 units and will be designed using the mid-century modern style.

==== Ulana ====
Ulana will be a affordable condo that will be adjacent to the separate Our Kakaʻako development. It is designed by Solomon Cordwell Buenz and it will consist of 350 units.

==== Kalae ====
Kalae will be a ultra-luxury condo and it will sit east on the intersection of Ward Avenue and Ala Moana Boulevard. It is designed by Solomon Cordwell Buenz and it will consist of 330 total units.

==== The Launiu ====
The Launiu will a ultra-luxury condo that will sit west on the intersection of Ward Avenue and Ala Moana Boulevard and will be adjacent to the separate Our Kakaʻako development's Alia Tower. It is designed by Arquitectonica and it will consist of 396 total units.

=== Phase Five developments ===
Phase five of the project consists of the Mahana, Melia, and Ilima condos.

==== Mahana ====
Mahana will be between The Park Ward Village and the future Skyline station. It is designed by Solomon Cordwell Buenz and will consist of 340 units.

==== Ilima ====
Ilima will be one of the most luxurious condos in the neighborhood. This condo will be on the existing Ward Centre site closest to the IBM Building. This condo will consist of 242 units. It is designed by RAMSA | Robert A.M. Stern Architects. This condo will be designed by stone rather than glass unlike the other condos.

==== Melia ====
Melia will be one of the most luxurious condos in the neighborhood. This condo will be on the existing Ward Centre site closest to Kamake'e Street/Waiea Condo. This condo will consist of 148 units and include a new Diamond Head Plaza Park. It is designed by RAMSA | Robert A.M. Stern Architects. Melia and This condo will be designed by stone rather than glass unlike the other condos.

=== Future developments ===
These are proposals of future projects that are proposed to occur in Ward Village, but are not planned for construction so far.

==== Future Skyline Station ====
Ward Village will be served by the future Kūkuluaeʻo Skyline Station that will be north of the Mahana condo. This station was cut from the city center construction section, but is still committed to be completed at a later date. However, the Howard Hughes Corporation, owner of Ward Village sued the Honolulu Authority for Rapid Transportation (HART) over land condemnation requirements for the Skyline station that required the loss of a proposed condo building. The litigation was settled in 2025.

==== West Village, Phase six development ====
On the Ward Village Master Plan, the land between the Ke Kilohana and Ulana condos is known as "West Village" and it is seen with five conceptual condos yet to be named. If these condos where to be proposed, these would be in a future Phase Six development.

=== LEED certification ===
Ward Village is a LEED-ND Platinum-Certified project. It is the largest development in the United States and the second largest in the world to receive this recognition. It is the only LEED-ND Platinum-Certified project in Hawaii. The design of Ward Village incorporates the highest standards of growth and environmental sustainability.
