= Trillium (Buckeye) =

Master-planned community in Maricopa County, Arizona

Coordinates: 33.6113°N 112.7297°W

Trillium is a 7,200 residential units master-planned community in Buckeye, Arizona, United States of America.

Site work on the project started in 2007, but no date was set for residential development. The developers of Douglass Ranch bought the Trillium project in February 2007, in order to develop both projects in tandem. The development is partly owned by Jerry Colangelo.

The project will be developed along the Sun Valley Parkway and be the entrance to Douglas Ranch, Buckeye.
