= 250 Water Street =

Development site in Manhattan, New York

General information
- Classification: Residential
- Coordinates: 40°42′30″N 74°0′10″W

Design and construction
- Architects: Skidmore, Owings & Merrill; Fogarty Finger
- Developer: Tavros

250 Water Street is a site in the Financial District of Lower Manhattan in New York City. Most recently occupied by a parking lot, the site is being developed into a mixed-use building by Tavros. It has been the subject of various redevelopment proposals since the 1980s. The site is located in the South Street Seaport, one of the city's historic districts.

== Early history ==
In the 19th century, a five-story thermometer factory occupied the site. The site also previously held other factories in which work with mercury occurred and a gas station. When the New York City Landmarks Preservation Commission (LPC) established the South Street Seaport Historic District in 1977, local officials had advocated for the LPC to designate 250 Water Street as part of the district. At the time, the site was zoned for high-rise office development, but the New York City Planning Commission had never changed the site's zoning. Additionally, the creation of the Seaport district allowed property owners within the district to transfer unused air rights to nearby sites, such as 250 Water Street. By the 1980s, a garage and two-deck parking lot stood on the site of 250 Water Street, which spanned 48,000 square feet (4,500 m^{2}) and covered a whole city block.

== Milstein Properties proposals ==
Milstein Properties purchased the site in 1979 for $5.8 million. Due to the site's location at the edge of the South Street Seaport Historic District, the LPC was required to approve all proposals for the site. Eight proposals by Milstein failed to gain LPC approval. Milstein's failures were likely informed by Milstein's 1981 conversion of the New York Biltmore Hotel to an office building. The hotel had been gutted so rapidly that almost nothing was salvageable, and preservationists had been disappointed that Milstein did not preserve the building's Palm Court. Residents of Southbridge Towers, to the north, consistently opposed Milstein's plans for fear that they would lose direct views of the East River directly to the south. There were also persistent concerns over each proposal's floor area ratio (FAR), or the ratio of interior space to land area; the LPC consistently cited the plans' "scale" as a reason for denying these plans.

Milstein's first two proposals for the site were designed by architect Ulrich Franzen. The first plan called for a 23-story structure with 944,000 square feet (87,700 m^{2}), but it was rejected due to objections over its high FAR of 18. Franzen's second plan called for a 577,000-square-foot (53,600 m^{2}), 43-story building with a lower FAR of 12; this plan would have included a plain beige-brick tower and a red-brick base blending in with nearby structures. Though the tower would have been narrower than in the previous proposal, residents still opposed it. In 1986, Jan Hird Pokorny was hired to design an Art Deco-inspired building, which would have consisted of twin apartment towers with 12 and 30 stories, in addition to a facade blending in with surrounding buildings. Robert Sobel of Emery Roth & Sons submitted a fourth proposal in early 1989, which called for a 14-story office building. Despite being smaller than any of the three previous proposals, Sobel's plan was near-universally opposed for being too large. Later in 1989, Milstein hired Platt & Byard to design a 15-story building with 477,000 square feet (44,300 m^{2}). By then, the delays in the development of 250 Water Street had also impacted nearby developments.

The Platt & Byard proposal, designed by Charles A. Platt and Paul Spencer Byard, was approved in 1991; the plans were downsized to a 10-story structure with a mechanical penthouse. Due to a financial downturn, it was never built. Yet another proposal was put forth in 1997, which called for twin towers measuring 14 and 30 stories tall. The new plans again faced pushback, and opponents created an alternative proposal for townhouses measuring 5 to 7 stories tall. Opponents also suggested using the site as a public park with a shaft for New York City Water Tunnel No. 3. Manhattan Community Board 1 voted in favor of downzoning 250 Water Street in 2002, imposing a height limit of 120 feet (37 m). An eighth proposal was unveiled in 2003, shortly after mayor Michael Bloomberg announced plans to rebuild Lower Manhattan. This proposal, which also faced opposition, called for two towers measuring 13 and 24 stories tall.

== Howard Hughes Corporation proposals ==
The Howard Hughes Corporation purchased the site in 2018 from Milstein Properties for $180 million. Milstein provided a $130 million loan to Howard Hughes to finance the purchase. At the time of the sale, Howard Hughes owned several nearby sites. After the acquisition, the first plans for the site were revealed in early 2020, though Howard Hughes denied they were reflective of their real intentions for the site. The organization claimed in a statement that the designs had leaked as part of the portfolio of a former Skidmore, Owings & Merrill architect and were not reflective of real plans. The leaked plans depicted a 1,052-foot tower clad in brick. Later in 2020, official plans calling for a development with two towers rising from a single podium were released.

A third proposal, featuring four shorter, closely gathered towers rising from a single podium and forming a single structure, was made public in early April 2021. The Landmarks Preservation Commission approved this design in early May. In addition to this approval, the project must go through the city's Uniform Land Use Review Procedure for work to begin. The ULURP process began in May 2021, but the vote was not planned to occur until 2022. The Howard Hughes Corporation agreed in October 2021 to pay $40 million for air rights above the former Fulton Fish Market's Tin Building and Pier 17. Subsequently, the city government approved plans for the site at the end of 2021. The 26-story building was to rise 324 feet (99 m) and contain 270 apartments (including at least 70 affordable housing units), as well as offices. During an archaeological dig conducted on and near the site which began in 2022, workers found historical artifacts including shoe components, ceramics, and glass.

=== Opposition to development ===
Designs commissioned by Milstein Properties faced opposition from locals, including by Paul Goldstein, then chairman of Manhattan Community Board 1's Waterfront, Parks & Cultural Committee, who proposed that the site might be used as a tow pound instead of a building. The various Skidmore, Owings & Merrill designs have also faced opposition outside the LPC. Opponents of the development criticize it for its scale compared to the local historic district and for its introduction of housing units into a flood zone.

A lawsuit filed during mid-2021 in an effort to prevent the development was dismissed in October of the same year, but opponents continued to pursue legal action. In a final attempt to prevent 250 Water Street from being built, the Seaport Coalition filed a lawsuit in July 2022 to prevent Howard Hughes's development from proceeding. In October 2022, New York Supreme Court judge Arthur Engoron placed an injunction on the development. According to Engoron, the LPC had rejected four proposals to develop that lot since the 1980s, but, in approving the Howard Hughes proposal, "the LPC failed adequately to acknowledge, much less explain, its departure from previous rulings." Engoron ruled against Howard Hughes in January 2023, saying that the developer and the LPC had agreed to an "impermissible quid pro quo". Howard Hughes planned to appeal Engoron's decision. In June 2023 Engoron's ruling was overturned; the state's highest court, the New York Court of Appeals, endorsed the decision to overturn Engoron's ruling in May 2024, allowing construction to proceed.

=== Construction and ownership changes ===
By early August 2023, the surface-level parking lot on the site was removed, and excavation was underway. During construction, in 2024, ownership of the project was transferred to the newly-formed Seaport Entertainment Group as part of its spin-off from Howard Hughes. That August, Howard Hughes also obtained the air rights above the Tin Building and Pier 17, as per its 2021 agreement with the city government. The 250 Water Street site was valued at $143 million by 2025, and in March, Seaport Entertainment indicated that it wanted to either sell the site or find a development partner. By May, Seaport had received over 130 bids for the site; the winning bidder would be able to take over Seaport Entertainment's plans. Development firm Tavros purchased the site, closing on it for $143 million in February 2026, $7 million less than the initial purchase price first reported in August 2025.

== Usage ==
Tavros's plans call for a mixed-use building with 600 residential units, retail, and a commercial component.

Chelsea Piers Fitness will operate a five-story gym facility in the development.
