= Ward Centers =

Ward Village
- Neighborhood
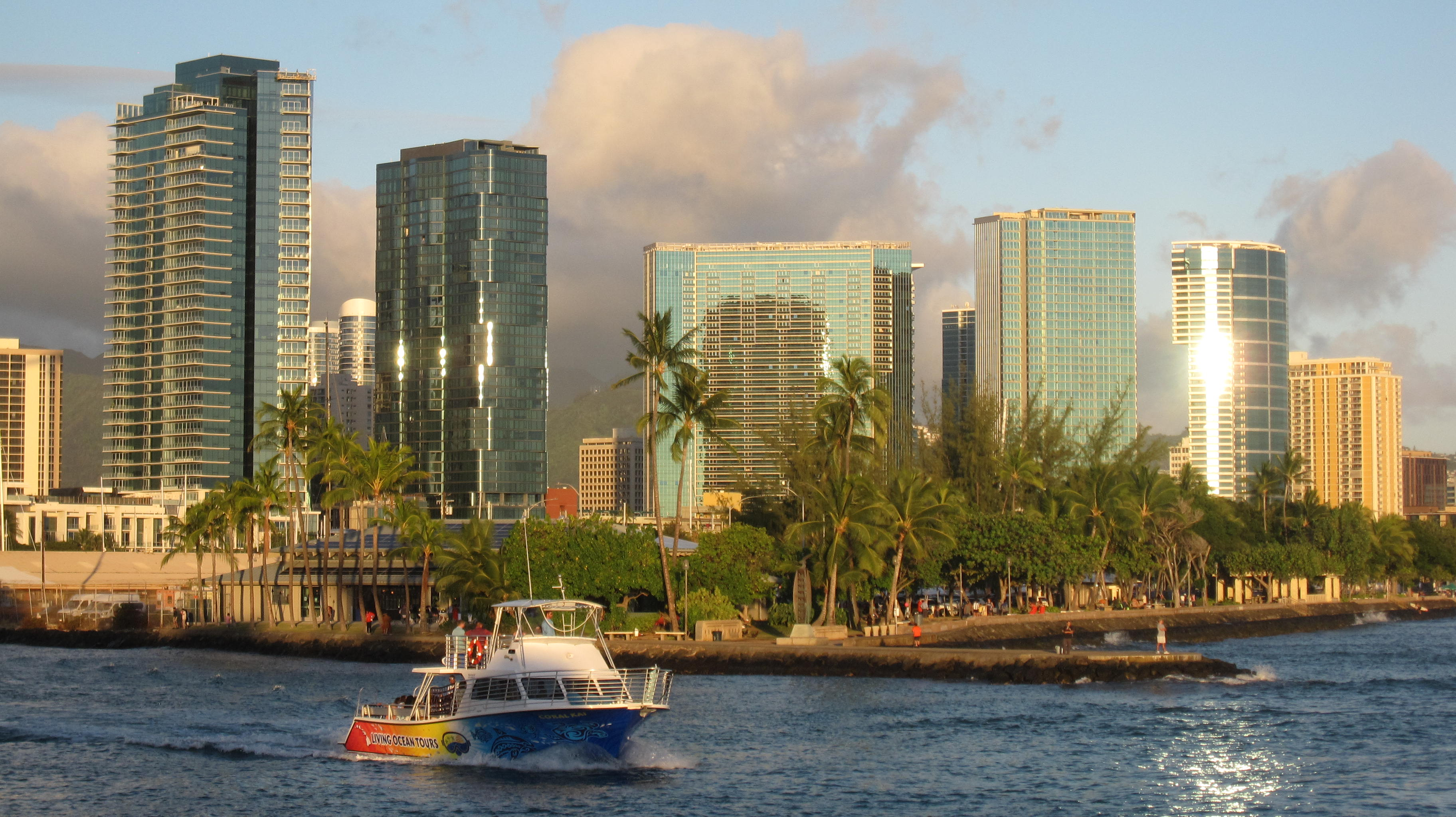
- Ward Village towers Waiea and Anaha (Left)
- Interactive map of Ward Village
- Coordinates: 21°17′48″N 157°51′20″W
- Website: www.wardvillage.com

Ward Centers, formerly known as Victoria Ward Centers, is a shopping complex near Waikiki at Kaka'ako in Honolulu, Hawai'i. Ward Centers serves as a retail hub for multiple shopping centers, including Ward Centre, Ward Village Shops, and the Ward Entertainment Center, a multimillion-dollar 150,000 square foot (14,000 m^{2}) entertainment center. Notable tenants of the entertainment center include a theater complex owned by Consolidated Theatres and Dave and Busters, which is expected to shut down in 2025.

== Redevelopment in the Ward Centers ==
The Howard Hughes Corporation plans to redevelop most of the Ward Centers with new condo towers, more retail, and eventually, a Skyline Station. Redevelopment is already complete at the Ward Warehouse, Ward Gateway center, Ward Farmers Market/Marukai and soon Ward Centre. They are expected to complete the full transformation in the late 2020s.

=== Changes seen in the Ward Centers (Ward Village) ===
In 2016, the old Pier 1 Imports was demolished to make way for Anaha. In 2017, the Office Depot/Nordstrom Rack anchored building was demolished to make way for Aeo/Whole Foods. In late 2017, the Ward Warehouse building, built in the 1970s, was mostly demolished to make way for Gateway Towers. At the same time, The Marukai Ward store and surrounding warehouses was shut down and was demolished to make way for the public Victoria Ward park, and the A'alii, Kōʻula, and The Park Ward Village condos. In 2019, the Ward Plaza was demolished to make way for The Launiu. In 2021, The Ward Gateway center was demolished to make way for The Park Ward Village, Mahana, and the future Skyline Station. In 2024; the Ward Warehouse parking garage was finally demolished to make way for Kalae.

The Ward Centre was a former shopping center, which had operated since 1982, closed permanently on June 30, 2026, after more than four decades of operation. The closure was part of the continued redevelopment of Ward Village, with the property planned for demolition and replacement by two luxury condominium towers at the Kakaʻako site. Hawaii News Now reported that redevelopment plans called for about 369 housing units, 20,000 square feet of retail space, and a one-acre public park. Several longtime tenants either relocated or closed as the center prepared to shut down.

== Early history ==
Victoria Ward was the wife of Honolulu industrialist Curtis Perry Ward and daughter of influential British shipbuilder James Robinson. Victoria Ward and her husband owned a vast estate (over 100 acres) in central Honolulu that stretched from Thomas Square to the shores of Ala Moana. On the estate was their mansion, Old Plantation, the site of the present-day Neal S. Blaisdell Center. In 1882, Curtis Perry Ward died and left his holdings to his wife and daughters. Victoria Ward continued the family business, purchasing real estate which would be developed for commercial use.

== Ward Village ==
Ward Village (Formerly Victoria Ward Limited) acts as the owner and operator of Ward Centers; it is owned under The Howard Hughes Corporation. The company owns approximately 65 acres in Honolulu, including the Ward Entertainment Center, Ward Centre, Village Shops, and current condo developments.
