= Kakaʻako =

Neighborhood of Honolulu, Hawaii

Coordinates: 21°17′46.73″N 157°51′19.76″W

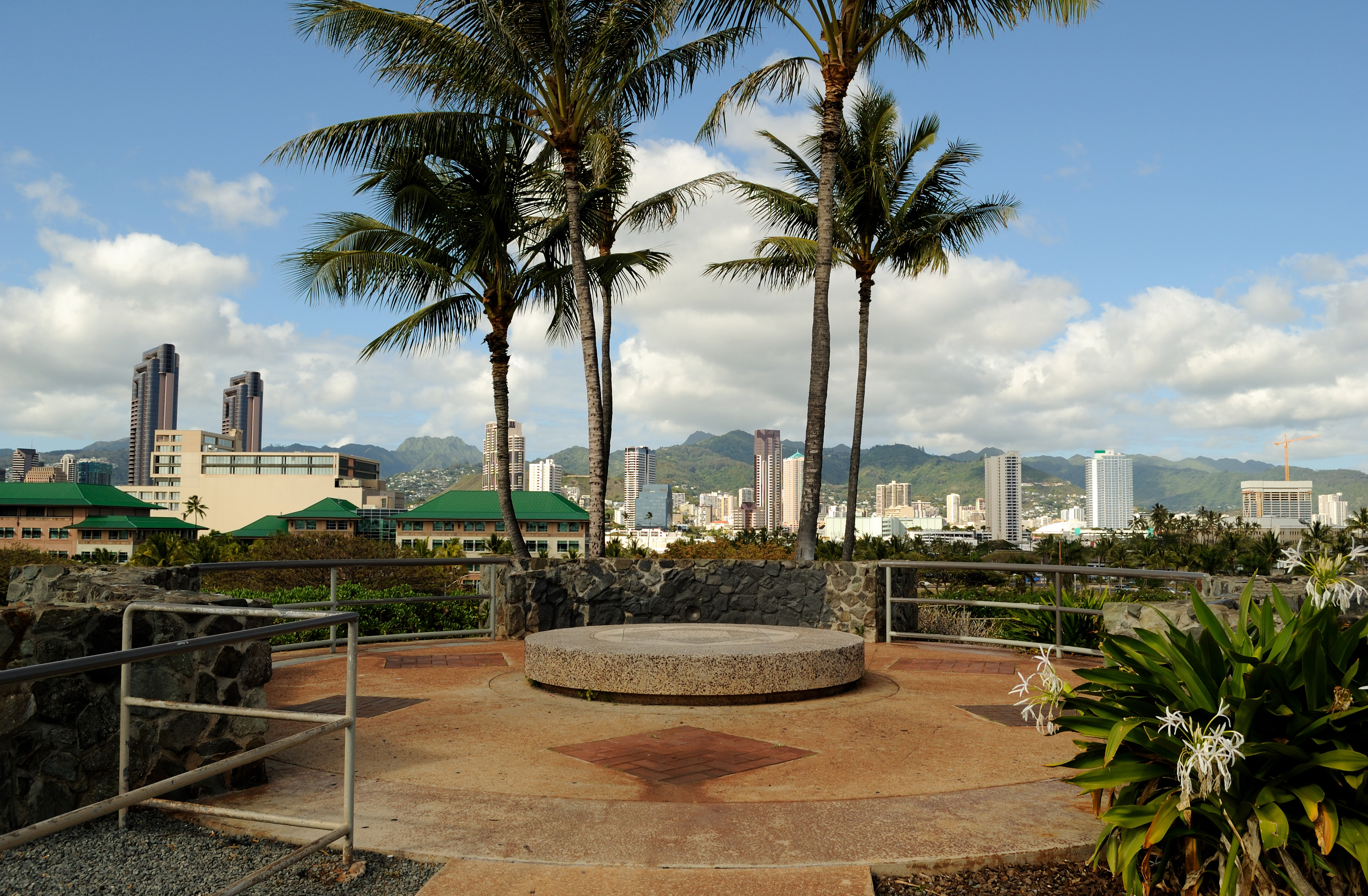
View of Kakaʻako from the Kakaʻako Waterfront Park

Kakaʻako is a commercial and retail district of Honolulu, Hawaiʻi between Ala Moana near Waikīkī to the east and downtown Honolulu and Honolulu Harbor to the west. Kakaʻako is situated along the southern shores of the island of Oʻahu, Hawaiʻi.

== History ==
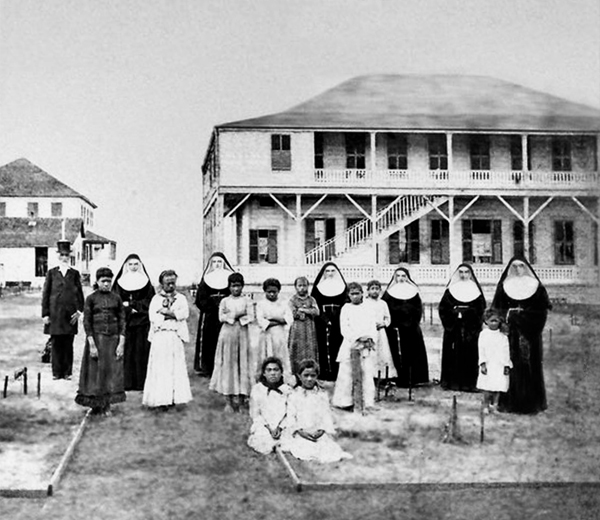
Walter Murray Gibson with the Sisters of St. Francis at the Kapiolani Home for Girls built near Kakaʻako Branch Hospital for the daughters of Hansen's disease patients

Kakaʻako was once a thriving Native Hawaiian community with agricultural terraces where Hawaiian royalty once lived. Kamehameha I had a residence with his family and personal kahuna and chief adviser Hewahewa. Hawaiians used the region for fishpond farming, salt making, wetland agriculture and human burials, according to Cultural Surveys Hawaii, which did several reports on the area.

Through recent development projects many locations have unearthed ancient Hawaiian burials (iwi) thought to be scattered throughout the district. One area in particular, the Honuakaha Smallpox Cemetery, has more than a thousand Iwi.

In 1976, Kakaʻako was an industrial district under city control. It got caught in a political feud between then-Mayor Frank Fasi and then-Gov. George Ariyoshi. Hawaiʻi lawmakers founded the Hawaii Community Development Authority (HCDA) in April 1976 as a way to prevent Fasi from using Kakaʻako as political leverage against Ariyoshi. The agency produced editorial opposition from local papers.

== Modern day ==
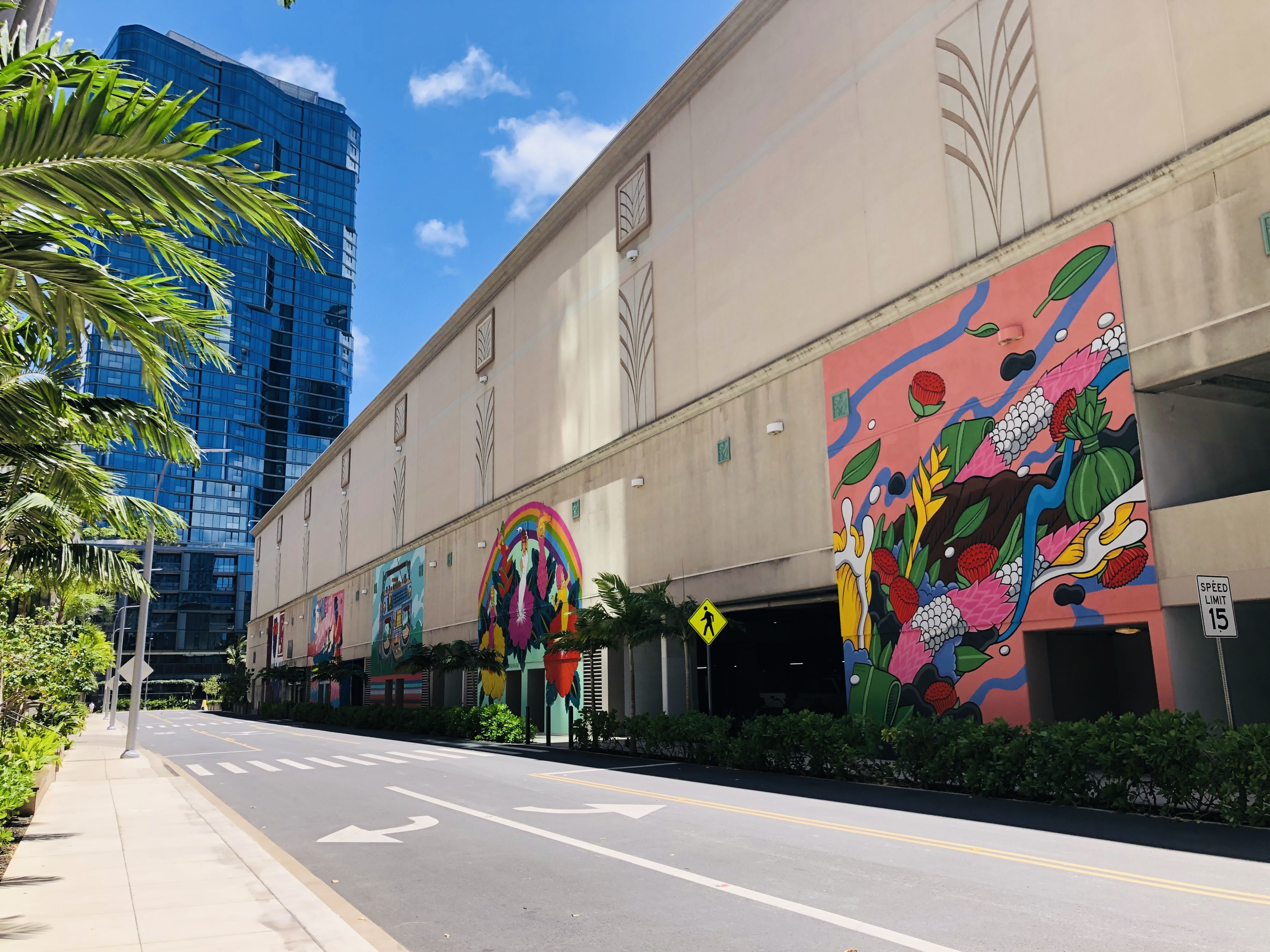
Halekauwila Street along new residential and commercial development in the Ward Village area.

The civic centers of Kakaʻako are Victoria Ward Centers and the Neal S. Blaisdell Center. On the ocean side is the John A. Burns School of Medicine, part of the University of Hawaiʻi at Mānoa. It is also the location of the University of Hawaiʻi Cancer Center, a research center designated by the National Cancer Institute. The main roads through Kakaʻako are Ala Moana Boulevard and Kapiʻolani Boulevard. In recent years, the area has been diversifying by adding more residential development.

HCDA is planning for up to 30 new buildings to be constructed in the area. The plans have produced protests by residents. HCDA rules allow buildings up to 400 feet high. Kakaʻako's proposed transit-oriented development plan would permit some towers to reach 700 feet, twice as high as the city’s building height limit.

Developers can skip the Hawaii Land Use Commission and Honolulu City Council. HCDA staff reviews proposals and its governor-appointed board has approval authority. In 2005, opposition group "Save Our Kakaʻako Coalition" protested Alexander & Baldwin's plans to build waterfront residential towers known as Kakaʻako Makai, leading the Legislature to effectively kill the project.

On 8 March 2014, the coalition rallied to protest against the proposed plans to develop residential homes alongside Kakaʻako's waterfront. The coalition feared that access to the waterfront would be limited and warranted only to residents of the new development, ultimately depriving the Hawaiian people access to this resource and thus violating both Hawaiian law and custom. Office of Hawaiian Affairs (OHA) trustee Peter Apo assured the public that OHA has no intentions of developing high-rises alongside Kakaʻako Makai. Apo added that if OHA did indeed conduct development in that area, it would betray the values and the people they serve. Lela Hubbard, member of Save Our Kakaʻako, claimed that OHA is only in it for the money.

In recent years, Kakaʻako has faced much controversy over growing concerns of gentrification and having previous affordable housing being bought out and no longer able to be used for low-income families.

== Our Kakaʻako ==
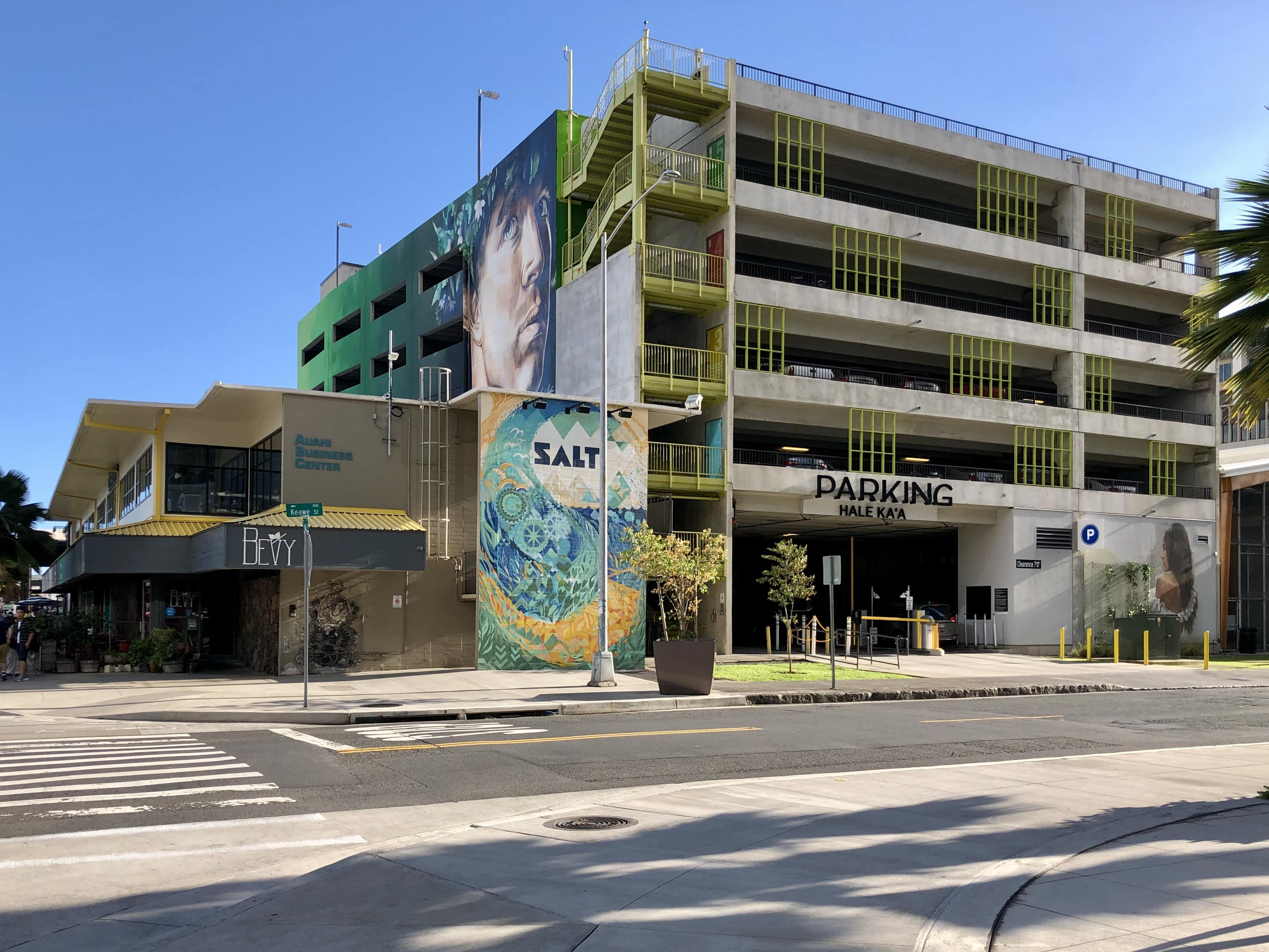
SALT at Our Kaka‘ako, a shopping, food, and event venue in downtown Honolulu, Oʻahu, Hawaiʻi.

Our Kakaʻako is a residential and commercial project led by Kamehameha Schools and Castle & Cooke Homes Hawaiʻi Inc. that aims to improve Hawaiʻi's urban-island lifestyle. The $60 million project will add 183 homes to Kakaʻako, with 88 rental units to be developed by Kamehameha Schools and Castle & Cooke developing the remaining 95 units for buyers. The project will redevelop existing properties in Kakaʻako for residential and commercial space, as well as integrate mid-block pedestrian crossways, networked walking paths, complete streetscapes, green spaces, and unique retail experiences. Our Kakaʻako is estimated to take 15–20 years to complete.

== Ward Village ==
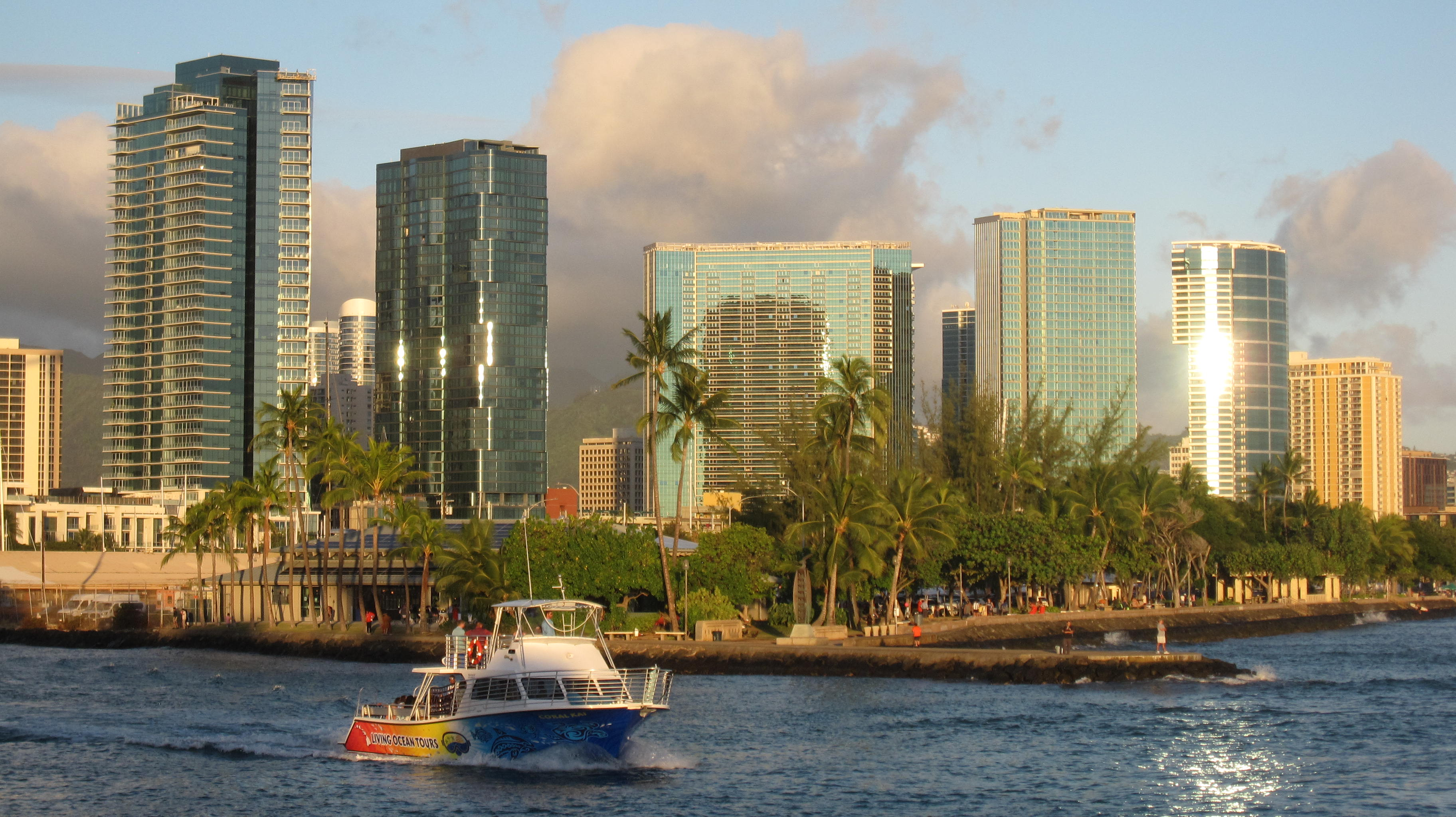
Ward Village towers Waiea and Anaha (Left)

Ward Village is a 60-acre (24 ha), master-planned community in the Kaka'ako district of Honolulu. It is being developed by The Howard Hughes Corporation. Once completed, this beachfront development will feature fifteen mixed-use residential towers, retail stores, entertainment venues, pedestrian friendly streets and public open space.

== See also ==
- POW! WOW!, international mural festival
