= Our Kakaʻako =

Hawaiʻian real estate development

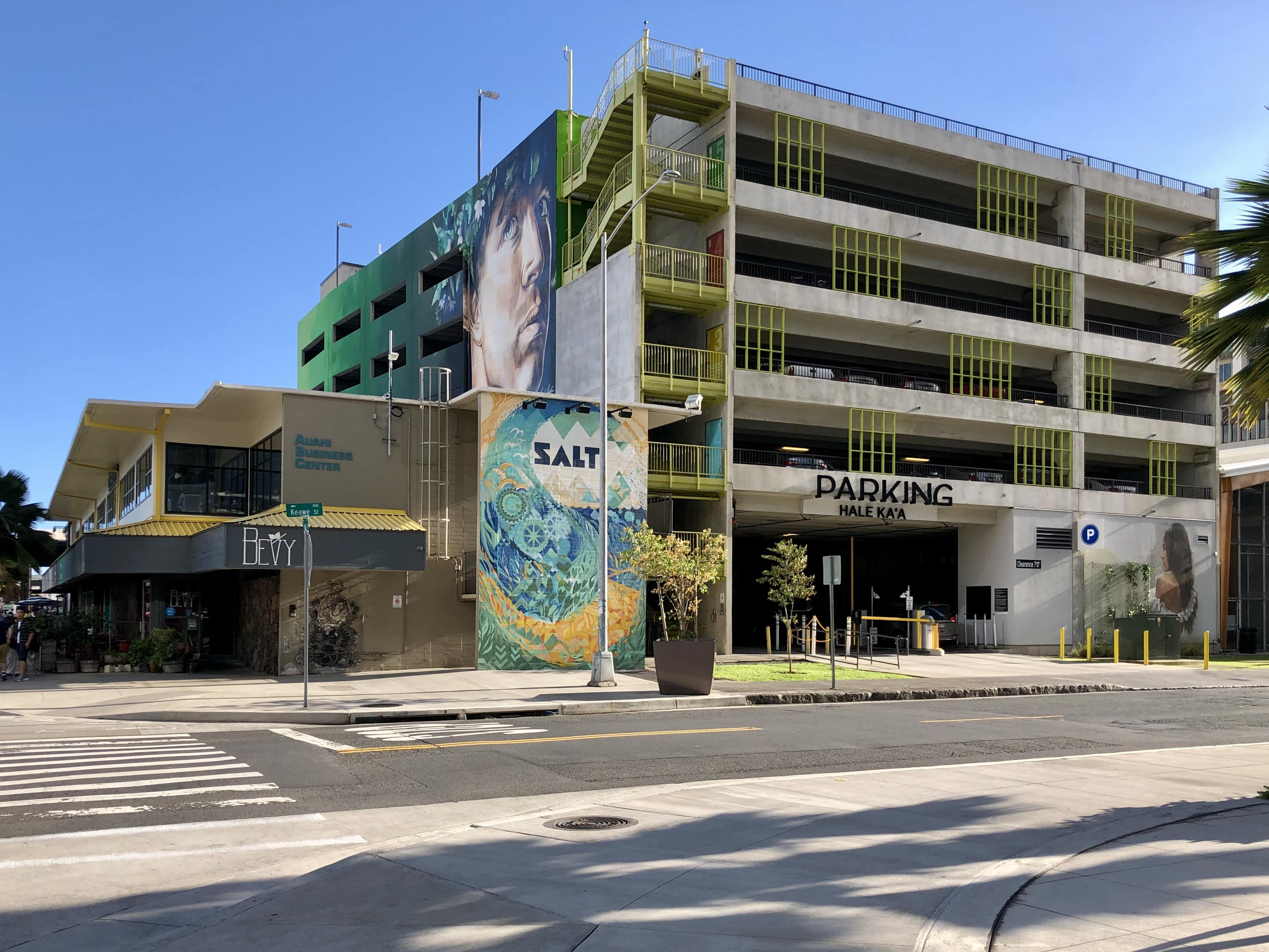
- SALT at Our Kaka‘ako, a shopping, food, and event venue in Honolulu, Oʻahu, Hawaii.
- Interactive map of Our Kakaʻako
- Coordinates: 21°17′57″N 157°51′36″W
- Website: ourkakaako.com

Our Kakaʻako is a residential and commercial project in the Kakaʻako neighborhood of Honolulu, Hawaii led by Kamehameha Schools, Stanford Carr, Kobayashi Group, and Castle & Cooke Homes Hawaiʻi Inc. The $60 million project aims to improve Hawaiʻi's urban-island lifestyle by adding 183 homes to the Kakaʻako area, with 88 rental units to be developed by Kamehameha Schools. Castle & Cooke will develop the remaining 95 units for buyers. The project also plans to redevelop existing properties in Kakaʻako for residential and commercial space, as well as integrate mid-block pedestrian crosswalks, networked walking paths, complete streetscapes, and green spaces, along with retail spaces. Our Kakaʻako is estimated to take 15–20 years to complete.

In accordance to Kamehameha Schools' sustainability efforts, Our Kakaʻako plans to reuse existing warehouses and other structures to "preserve the feel" of Kakaʻako.

== SALT at Our Kakaʻako ==
Event space at SALT at Our Kaka‘ako.

"SALT" is one of the new developments of Kamehameha Schools' master plan, designed for locals and visitors to enjoy a cosmopolitan environment accompanied with green and open-air spaces. Covering an area of 76,000 square feet, it currently serves as a marketplace housing a variety of retailers and restaurants.

The development of SALT aims to cater to a larger and "more creative" demographic in the Kakaʻako area. Its name references the historical pa‘akai (salt) ponds which historically existed in the low-lying wetlands of the area.

== Six Eighty ==
To continue their preservation efforts, Kamehameha Schools hired contractors to redevelop a previous office building and create "Six Eighty," an apartment structure named after its address at 680 Ala Moana Boulevard. Six Eighty is the first installment of Kamehameha Schools' nine-block master plan for Kakaʻako. It is an affordable housing complex that offers both studio and one-bedroom loft-style apartments. Each apartment comes with a 12-foot ceiling, half and full-size kitchens, a full-size bathroom, and compact lighting. Kamehameha Schools created Six Eighty to be a modern and contemporary rental complex consisting of 54 units reserved for median-income renters. The complex is home to small retail shops and eateries and an open-air venue on the roof.

== Dwellings ==
A number of condominiums have been developed as part of the project. The first development, "The Collection", is an ultra-luxury development with 397 units and 14 townhomes, constructed in 2016 by Stanford Carr. This was followed by the redevelopment of "Keauhou Place and Keauhou Lane" in 2017, two locations comprising a mixed-use condo of 423 units and a low-rise mixed-use complex of 209 units. This development is adjacent a future Skyline rail station.

A public housing rental development consisting of 456 units, known as "The Flats at Pu‘unui", opened in 2023.

=== Future plans ===
"Kaliʻu" will be the next redevelopment project in Our Kakaʻako, with ProsPac selected as the developer. The 400-foot structure will comprise 330 market-priced homes and 42,000 square feet of commercial space that will expand the neighborhood retail, grocery, and dining options in Our Kaka‘ako. Kaliʻu, meaning well-seasoned in Hawaiian, embodies concepts of resource stewardship and sustainability and honors the region's famous salt-bed lands in old Hawaiʻi.

"Ālia" will be a luxury mixed-use condo development next to Ward Village's Launiu and will consist of 477 units, at least 40 of which will be affordable.

Kahuina will be an affordable mixed-use condo development in Our Kaka'ako. This development will have 60% affordable and workforce housing; as well as affordable retail space.

== Future Skyline station ==
Our Kaka'ako will be served by Kaʻākaukukui station, the planned terminus of the Skyline light metro rail system, as of 2024. It will be located next to the Keauhou Place condominium.
