= POW! WOW! =

International mural arts festival

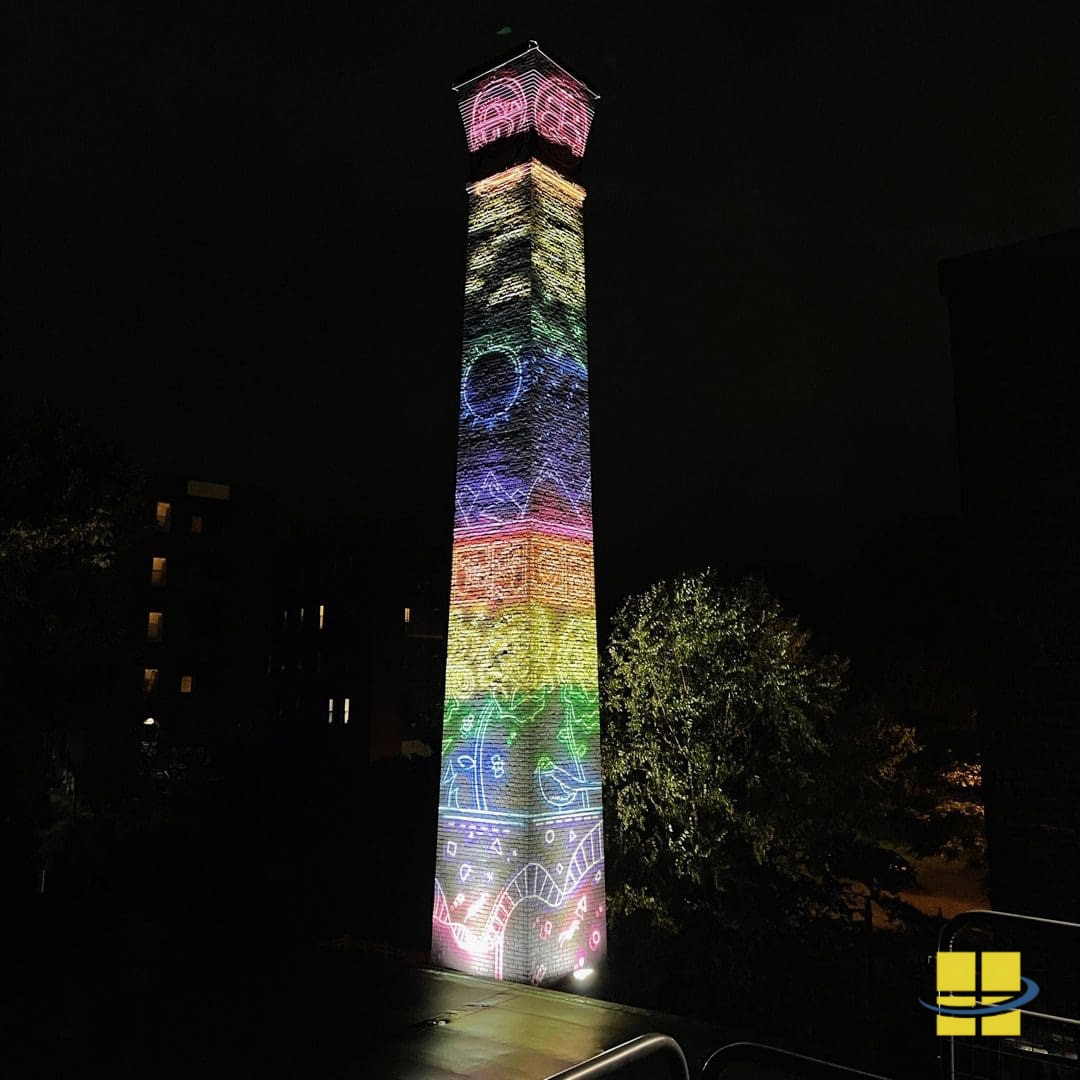
The Ivy Corset Building smokestack in Worcester illuminated by Access Fixtures LED projectors during the POW! WOW! festival.

POWWOW is an international mural arts festival founded by Jasper Wong in Hong Kong in 2009. In 2010, the first edition of POWWOW as a week-long mural arts festival was held in Honolulu, Hawaii. The festival has since exhibited in 17 cities worldwide with the purpose of city beautification and community building. Past festivals have also featured local restaurants, partnerships with local sports teams, illuminated art installations, and musical performances from artists such as Eminem.

While POWWOW shares the name of the Native American Pau Wau gathering, the festival's name originates combining the "Pow" of comic book action bubbles with the "WOW" of a reader's reaction.

In April 2020, POW! WOW! celebrated its tenth anniversary by releasing a 256-page hardcover book through Paragon Books. All international editions of the festival are represented through a photo reportage of a mural created there at least once.

== Notable participants ==
- Amy Sol
- Shepard Fairey
- Allison "Hueman" Torneros

== Festival years ==
Festival	Location	Festival Years	Notes
POW! WOW! Hawaii	Kaka'ako District, Honolulu, Hawaii, U.S.	2011—2019	
POW! WOW! Long Beach	Long Beach, California, U.S.	2015—2020	
POW! WOW! Worcester	Worcester, Massachusetts, U.S.	2016—2019	
POW! WOW! DC	NoMa neighborhood, Washington, D.C., U.S.	2016—2019	
POW! WOW! San Jose	San Jose, California, U.S.	2017—2019	
POW! WOW! Korea	Seoul, South Korea	2017—2019	
POW! WOW! Rotterdam	Rotterdam, The Netherlands	2018—2020	
POW! WOW! Cleveland	Cleveland, Ohio, U.S.	2020	
