= Marukai Corporation U.S.A. =

American company

Marukai Corporation U.S.A., Inc.

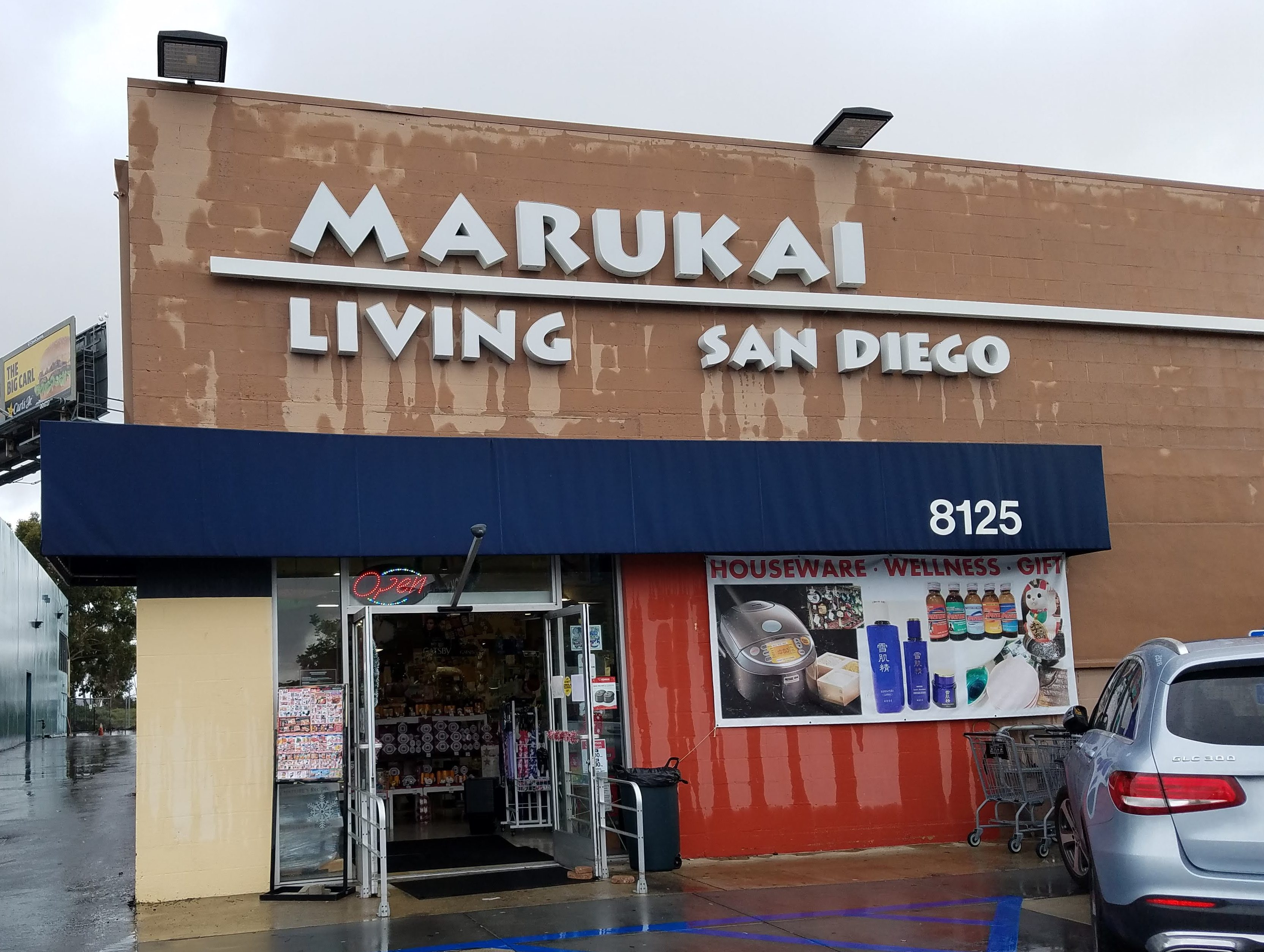
- Marukai Living storefront in San Diego
- Company type: Department store, grocer, former subsidiary of Marukai Corporation
- Industry: Department stores, market
- Founded: 1965; 61 years ago in Hawaii
- Founders: Richard Matsu; Hidejiro Matsu
- Headquarters: Gardena, California
- Number of locations: 14
- Area served: California, Hawaii
- Products: Imported Japanese goods
- Owner: Don Quijote
- Number of employees: 670 (400 in California, 270 in Hawaii)
- Divisions: Tokyo Central
- Subsidiaries: 98cent Plus Markets (defunct)
- Website: marukai.com

Marukai Corporation U.S.A. is an American chain of retail markets that imports and sells Japanese goods in American cities. Originally started by the Osaka, Japan-based Marukai Corporation (Japan), it has been owned by Don Quijote since 2013. Unlike other Japanese supermarkets, which may carry non-Japanese products based on local diversity, Marukai has Hawaiian products as a core focus in addition to Japanese in all its stores. Its headquarters are in Gardena, California, in Greater Los Angeles.

== History ==
The company was founded in 1965 by Richard and Hidejiro Matsu, sons of the founder of parent company Marukai Trading. In 1975, the company established Marukai Los Angeles. By 1980, it changed to its current name and opened Marukai Wholesale Mart in Gardena, California. The company began to emphasize membership-based retail shopping.

In 1999, the company opened its first 98cent Plus Store carrying Daiso products, before Daiso had its own stores in US. The company has since expanded to 11 locations in California with over 400 employees in California. These stores sell Japanese food and household items.

In 2013, Don Quijote purchased 100 percent of Marukai Corporation U.S.A. stock from its Japanese parent company. In 2015, Marukai started operating stores under the name Tokyo Central.

== Locations ==
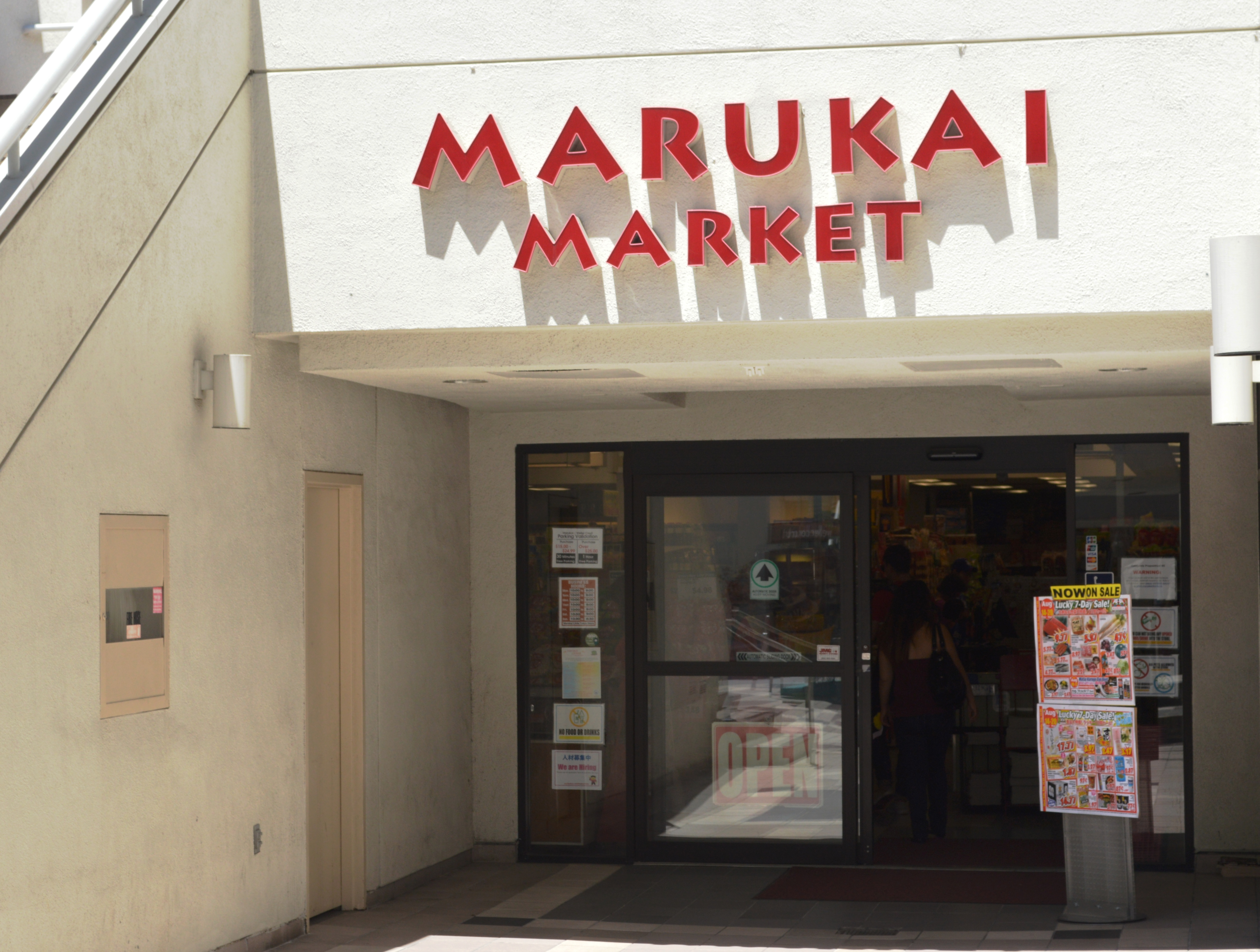
Former side entrance of the Marukai Market in Little Tokyo, Los Angeles

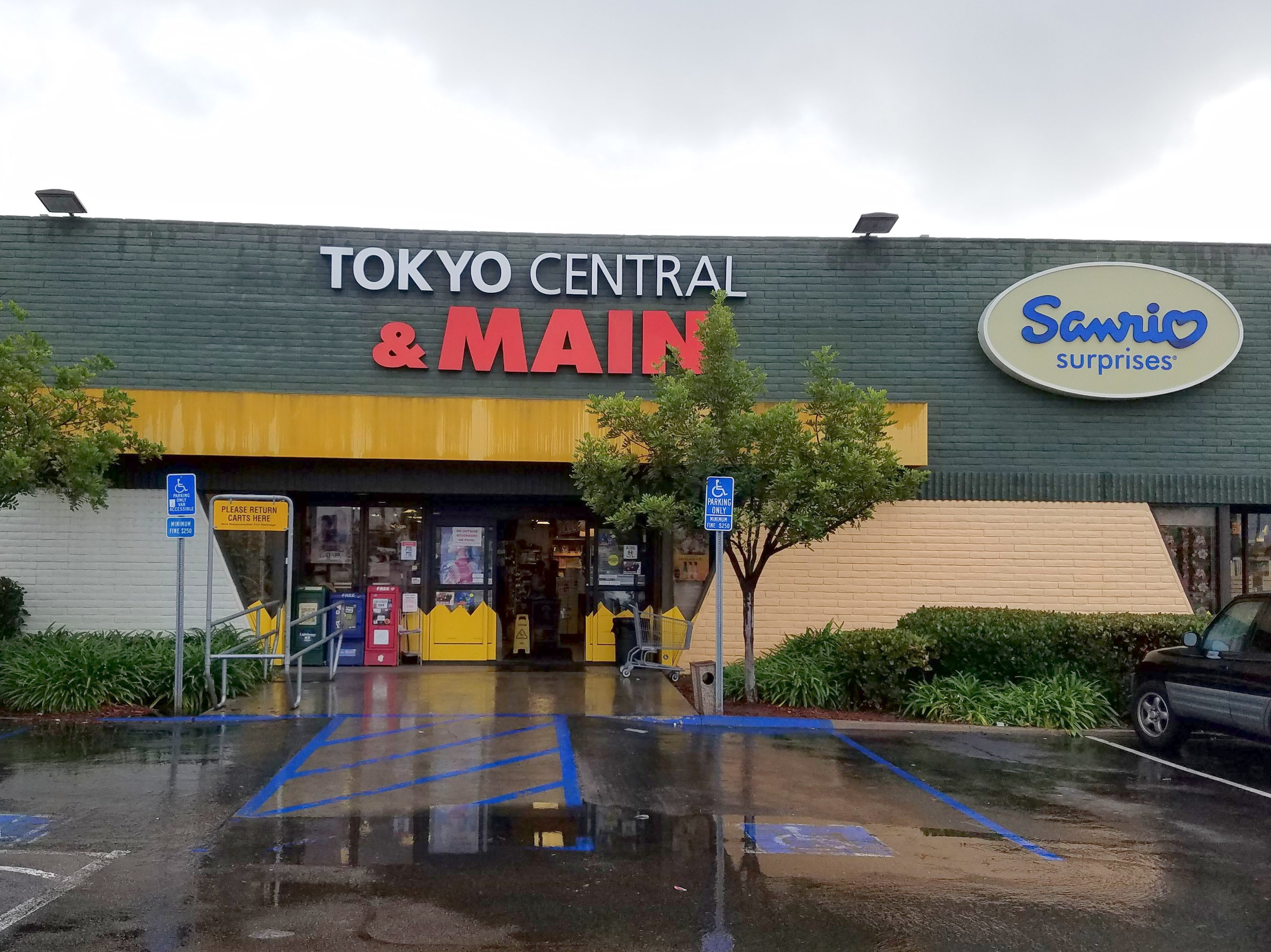
Tokyo Central & Main storefront in San Diego, California

Marukai

- Marukai Market
  - Little Tokyo, Los Angeles, California
  - West Los Angeles, California
  - San Diego, California
- Marukai Wholesale Mart
  - Honolulu, Hawaii
    - Kalihi
    - Ward Village (closed September 30, 2017)

Tokyo Central

- Tokyo Central & Main
  - Gardena, California
  - San Diego, California
- Tokyo Central Specialty Market
  - Gardena, California
  - Costa Mesa, California
  - Irvine, California
  - Torrance, California
  - West Covina, California
  - Cupertino, California
  - Emeryville, California
  - Yorba Linda, California
  - Kailua, Hawaii

== Controversy ==
On March 9, 2006, Marukai agreed to pay a $52,000 fine to the United States Environmental Protection Agency for selling 11 unregistered Japanese pesticide products.

In 2011, the company was fined $222,030 for selling and distributing unregistered pesticides and mislabeled pesticide devices, violations that were found in 2008.

== See also ==
- Mitsuwa Marketplace
- 99 Ranch Market
- H Mart
- Nijiya Market
- Kam Man Food
- T&T Supermarket
