= Teravalis =

Proposed community in Maricopa County, Arizona

Teravalis, formerly known as Douglas Ranch, is a proposed 33,800-acre (137 km^{2}) master-planned community in Buckeye, Arizona, located 25 miles (40 km) west of Phoenix, Arizona, United States. The project had been anticipated to break ground in 2012, but was delayed due to a housing crisis that overtook the Phoenix metropolitan area in 2008. Development resumed in 2019. The Howard Hughes Corporation broke ground in the community in October 2022.

Teravalis is anticipated to become one of the leading MPCs in the country, with up to 100,000 homes, 300,000 residents, and 55 million square feet of commercial development. Residential lot sales at Teravalis are scheduled to begin in 2024. The MPC was acquired by Howard Hughes Corporation from JDM Partners, led by Jerry Colangelo, David Eaton and Mel Shultz, and El Dorado Holdings, led by Mike Ingram; both companies will remain as joint venture partners with HHC on Floreo, the 3,000-acre first village of Teravalis.

As of 2022 the development had only limited water rights. A number of options have been proposed to acquire enough water to satisfy the legal requirement in Arizona that a development have a 100-year supply of water.
