= Show house =

House built as an example by a manufacturer or architect

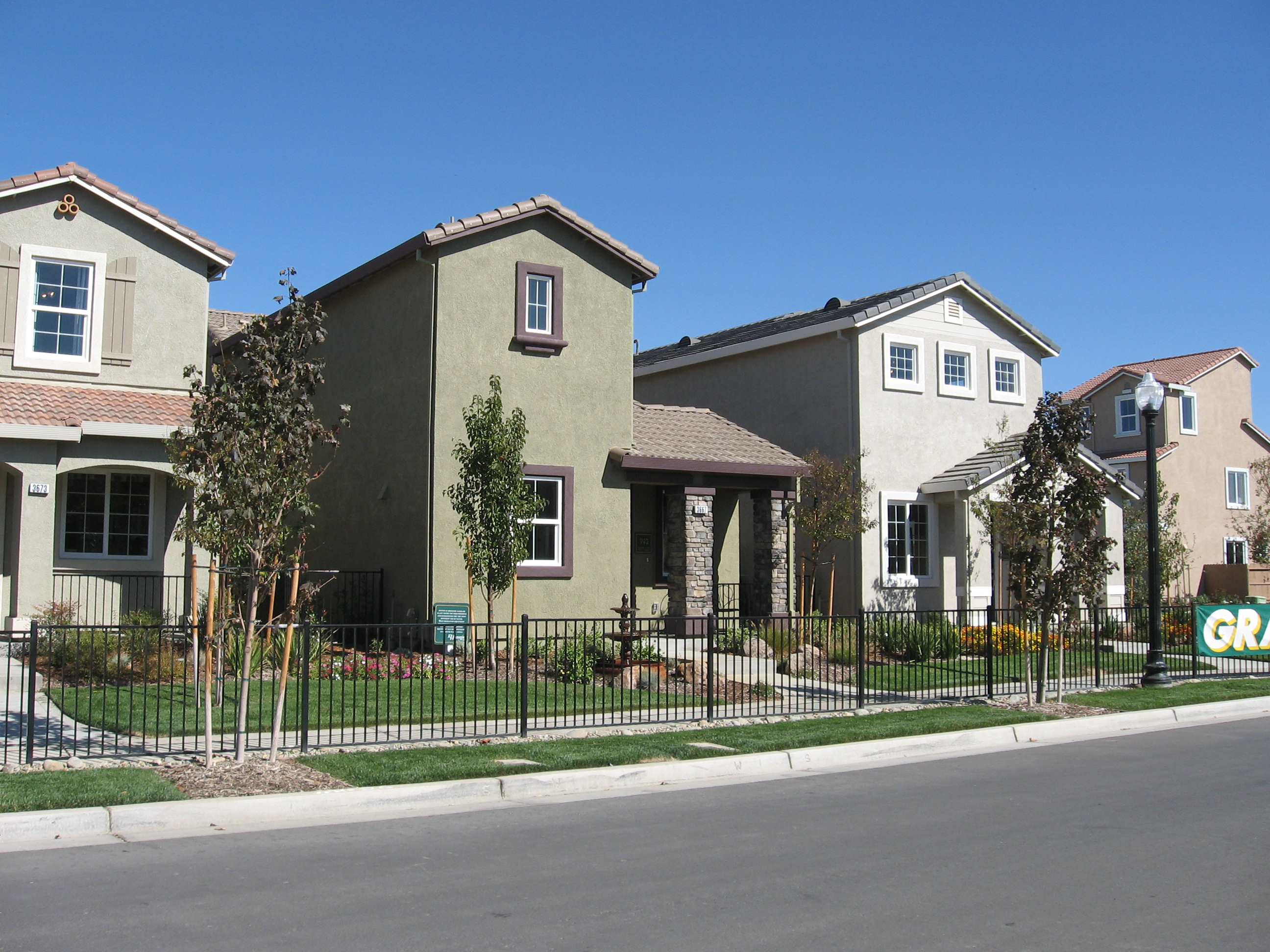
Model homes in Sacramento.

A show house, also called a model home or display home, is a "display" version of manufactured homes, or houses in a subdivision. They are used on newly built developments to show the living space and features of homes available. Show homes are often built in such a way that they can be sold like any other house once the construction of other houses in the area is finished, and as such are connected to utilities such as mains electricity, telephone lines and water mains.

They are almost always equipped with full furnishings, including appliances and interior decoration ("staging") to allow prospective buyers to more easily visualize what the house would look like when lived in. Once the home is ultimately put up for sale, many builders will give buyers the option to buy the home in its fully furnished state.

In model homes that have attached garages (which is common among homes in subdivisions), the garage is usually completely finished to look like another room of the house, making it viable office space for the salespeople working at the model. This is often the first thing that prospective buyers see when entering the home, making it a "lobby" of sorts. The eventual homeowner can choose to keep it as a home office or utilize it as a garage.

== See also ==
- Architectural model
