= Howard Hughes Holdings =

US real estate development and management company

Howard Hughes Holdings Inc.
- Type: Public
- Traded as: NYSE: HHH; S&P 600 component; Russell 1000 component
- Industry: Real estate development
- Founded: 2010; 16 years ago
- Headquarters: The Woodlands, Texas, U.S.
- Key people: Bill Ackman (chairman); David O'Reilly (CEO)
- Revenue: ▲US$1.75 billion (2024)
- Operating income: ▲US$564 million (2024)
- Net income: ▲US$201 million (2024)
- Total assets: ▼US$9.21 billion (2024)
- Total equity: ▼US$2.77 billion (2024)
- Owner: Pershing Square Capital Management (47%)
- Number of employees: 608 (2023)
- Website: howardhughes.com

Howard Hughes Holdings Inc., formerly the Howard Hughes Corporation, is a real estate development and management company based in The Woodlands, Texas. It was formed in 2010 as a spin-off from General Growth Properties (GGP). Most of its holdings are focused on several master-planned communities. It took its name from the original Howard Hughes Corporation, which had developed the planned community of Summerlin, Nevada, and later became a subsidiary of The Rouse Company until GGP acquired them in 2004.

== History ==
General Growth Properties filed for Chapter 11 bankruptcy protection in 2009. The company proposed a reorganization plan that included spinning off a new company named General Growth Opportunities, which would include those properties that had long-term development potential but little or no income. The name of the proposed spin-off was later changed to The Howard Hughes Corporation (HHC). The spin-off of HHC to GGP's shareholders was completed on November 9, 2010, when GGP exited bankruptcy. The new company held a portfolio that included GGP's master planned communities, mixed-use developments, and undeveloped land. Hedge fund manager Bill Ackman was appointed chairman of the new company.

In 2019, in response to investor disappointment with the company's stock price, HHC conducted a review of strategic options, including the possibility of selling the company. Ultimately, the company announced a "transformation plan", under which it would focus on its master-planned communities and sell off $2 billion of non-core assets. HHC moved its headquarters from Dallas to The Woodlands in 2020 as a cost-cutting measure under this plan.

The company acquired its sixth master-planned community in 2021, purchasing the 37,000-acre Douglas Ranch development in the Phoenix area (later renamed to Teravalis) for $600 million.

In 2023, HHC reorganized itself as a holding company named Howard Hughes Holdings (HHH), with the Howard Hughes Corporation as a subsidiary. It then moved its entertainment-related properties into a new division, Seaport Entertainment, which it planned to spin off to shareholders by the end of 2024. Seaport Entertainment's assets would include the South Street Seaport in Manhattan, the Las Vegas Aviators baseball team, the air rights to develop a casino at Fashion Show Mall on the Las Vegas Strip, and a minority stake in Jean-Georges Restaurants. The spinoff was completed in August 2024.

In May 2025, HHH agreed to a $900 million investment from Bill Ackman's company, Pershing Square Capital Management, raising Pershing's ownership stake to 47 percent. Ackman rejoined HHH as executive chairman and described plans to transform it into a diversified holding company, modeled on Berkshire Hathaway. In a step toward this strategy, HHH agreed later that year to acquire Vantage Group Holdings, a reinsurance and specialty insurance firm, for $2.1 billion. Ackman hoped that the finances of an insurance company would serve as a foundation for HHH to acquire controlling stakes in other smaller companies.

== Current properties ==
The company divides its properties into segments: master planned communities, operating assets, and strategic developments.

=== Master planned communities ===
The company has six master planned communities, with a total of approximately 35,000 acres (14,000 ha) of land remaining to be developed or sold.

- Bridgeland, Texas
- Columbia, Maryland
- Summerlin, Nevada
- Teravalis, Arizona
- The Woodlands, Texas
- The Woodlands Hills, Texas

=== Operating assets ===
This category comprises 73 revenue-generating assets as of 2023, including retail, office, and multi-family residential properties, most of which are located in the company's six master planned communities. The portfolio includes 11 retail properties with 2.1 million square feet of space; 34 office properties with 6.6 million square feet of space; and 17 apartment complexes with a total of 5,587 units. Notable properties include:

- Downtown Summerlin – Summerlin, Nevada
- Kewalo Basin Harbor – Honolulu, Hawaii
- Summerlin Hospital – Summerlin, Nevada (5 percent interest)
- Ward Village retail – Honolulu, Hawaii

=== Strategic developments ===
The company lists 18 strategic projects as of 2023, in various stages of development. Notable projects include:

- Ward Village condominiums – Honolulu, Hawaii
- West End Alexandria – Alexandria, Virginia

== Former properties ==
- 110 North Wacker – Chicago, Illinois
- The Outlet Collection at Riverwalk – New Orleans, Louisiana
- The Woodlands Resort – The Woodlands, Texas

== Seaport Entertainment Group ==
Seaport Entertainment Group (AMEX: SEG) is an entertainment and real estate development company based in New York City that was formed in 2024 as a spin-off of Howard Hughes Holdings.

Seaport's namesake property is the South Street Seaport in Manhattan, where it owns Pier 17, the Fulton Market Building, the Tin Building, and various other retail, office, and restaurant properties. At 250 Water Street, Seaport is developing a high-rise mixed-use building.

Other assets include the Las Vegas Aviators baseball team, the Las Vegas Ballpark, an 80% stake in air rights to develop a casino hotel at the Fashion Show Mall on the Las Vegas Strip, and a 25% stake in Jean-Georges Restaurants.
