= List of British Chinese people =

This article is a list of notable people of Chinese ancestry who were born in or have settled in the United Kingdom.

To be included in this list, the person must have a Wikipedia article showing they are British Chinese or must have references showing they are British Chinese and are notable.

== Academia ==
- Kevin Fong, professor of medicine, UCL academic
- Charles K. Kao, KBE, Nobel Prize in Physics, pioneer in the development and use of fibre-optics in telecommunications
- Kay-Tee Khaw, CBE, of Singaporean background, professor of Clinical Gerontology at the University of Cambridge
- Li Wei, prominent British linguist, journal editor, educator, and university leader, of Manchu-Chinese heritage; current director and dean of the UCL Institute of Education, University College London
- Zion Tse, biomedical engineer, Academy of Medical Sciences professor in AI and Robotics for Healthcare
- Giles Yeo, MBE, of Singaporean background, professor of molecular neuroendocrinology at the Medical Research Council Metabolic Diseases Unit and scientific director of the Genomics/Transcriptomics Core at the University of Cambridge
- Linda Yueh, CBE, prominent economist and UK trade advisor and dual British-American
- Zhu Hua, professor of Language Learning and Intercultural Communication at the UCL Institute of Education, University College London, director of the International Centre of Intercultural Studies, and chair of the British Association for Applied Linguistics

== Acting ==
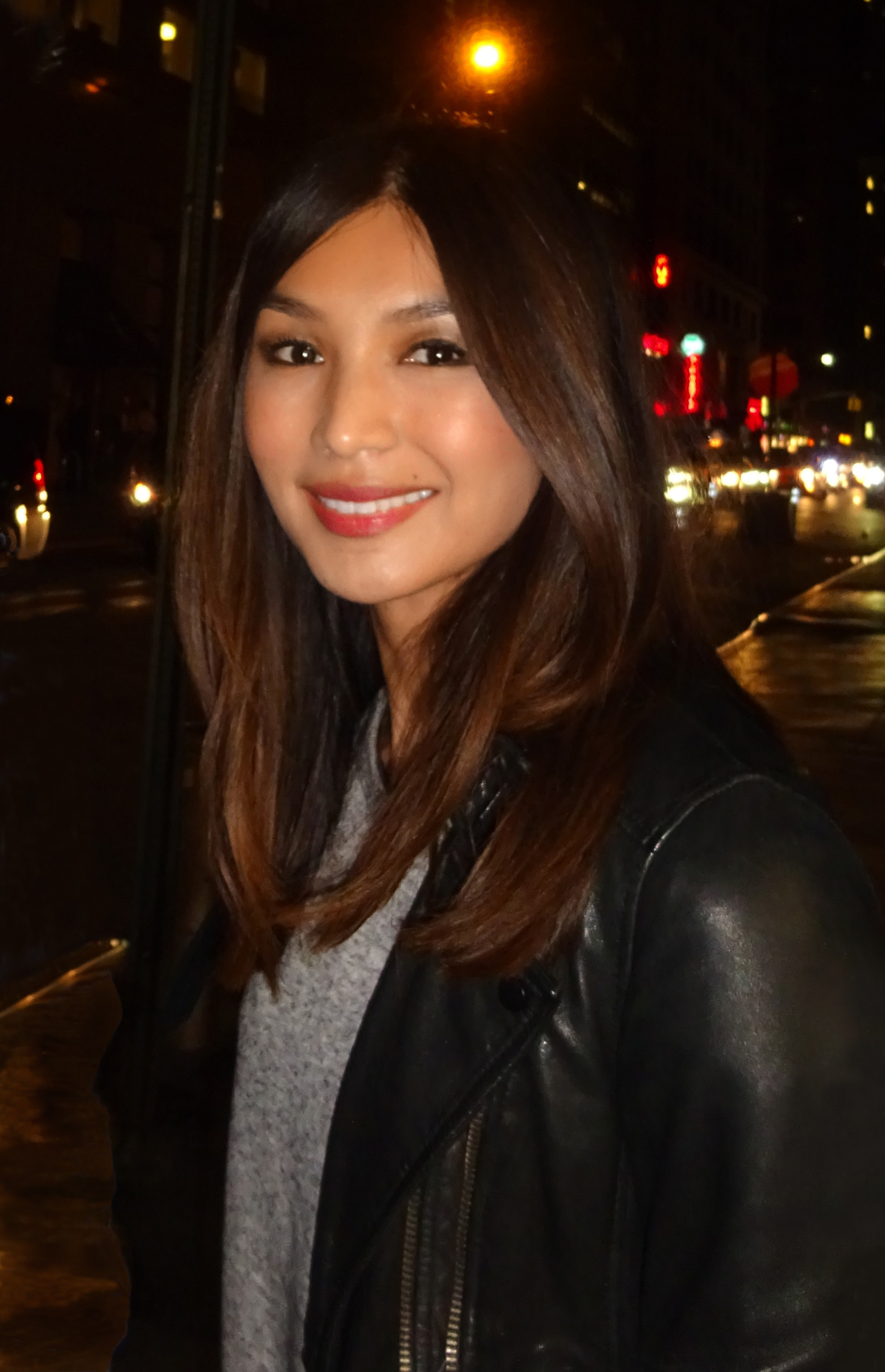
Gemma Chan

- Leah Bracknell (born 1964), actress and yoga teacher, Eurasian, English father and Chinese-Malaysian mother
- Gemma Chan (born 1982), actress
- Julia Chan (born 1983), actress
- Lobo Chan (born 1960), actor
- Maggie Cheung (born 1964), actress
- Tsai Chin (born 1933), actress and singer, first Chinese Bond girl
- Vera Chok (born 1987), actor
- Christina Chong (1983), actress
- Linda Louise Duan (born 1993), actress
- Jon Foo (born 1982), actor and wushu martial artist
- William Gao (born 2003), actor, Eurasian
- Mona Hammond (born 1931), actress
- Jessica Henwick (born 1992), actress, Eurasian
- Alice Hewkin (born 1999), actress
- Paul Courtenay Hyu (born 1968), actor, writer and Elvis impersonator, Eurasian
- Burt Kwouk (1930–2016), actor
- Pui Fan Lee (born 1970), actress and television presenter
- Katie Leung (born 1987), actress
- Jessie Mei Li (born 1995), actress
- Jennifer Lim (born 1980), actress
- Pik-Sen Lim (1944–2025), actress
- Selina Lo (born 1994), actress
- Jing Lusi (born 1985), actress
- Jane March (born 1973), actress, Eurasian
- Max Minghella (born 1985), actor, Eurasian
- Carl Ng (born 1976), actor, Eurasian
- Suan-Li Ong (born 1990), actress-model
- Colin Ryan (born 1986), actor, Eurasian
- Marli Siu (born 1993), actress, Eurasian
- Elaine Tan (born 1979), actress
- Elizabeth Tan (born 1990), actress
- Lewis Tan (born 1987), actor and martial artist
- Jason Tobin (born 1975), actor
- Rhydian Vaughan (born 1988), actor, Eurasian
- Benedict Wong (born 1971), actor
- Jason Wong (born 1986), actor
- Sophie Wu (born 1983), actress, Eurasian
- Tom Wu (born 1972), actor
- David Yip (born 1951), actor, Eurasian
- George Young (born 1980), actor and writer, Eurasian
- Ric Young (born 1944), actor
- Crystal Yu (born 1987), actress
- Ozzie Yue (born 1947), actor and singer

== Art and design ==
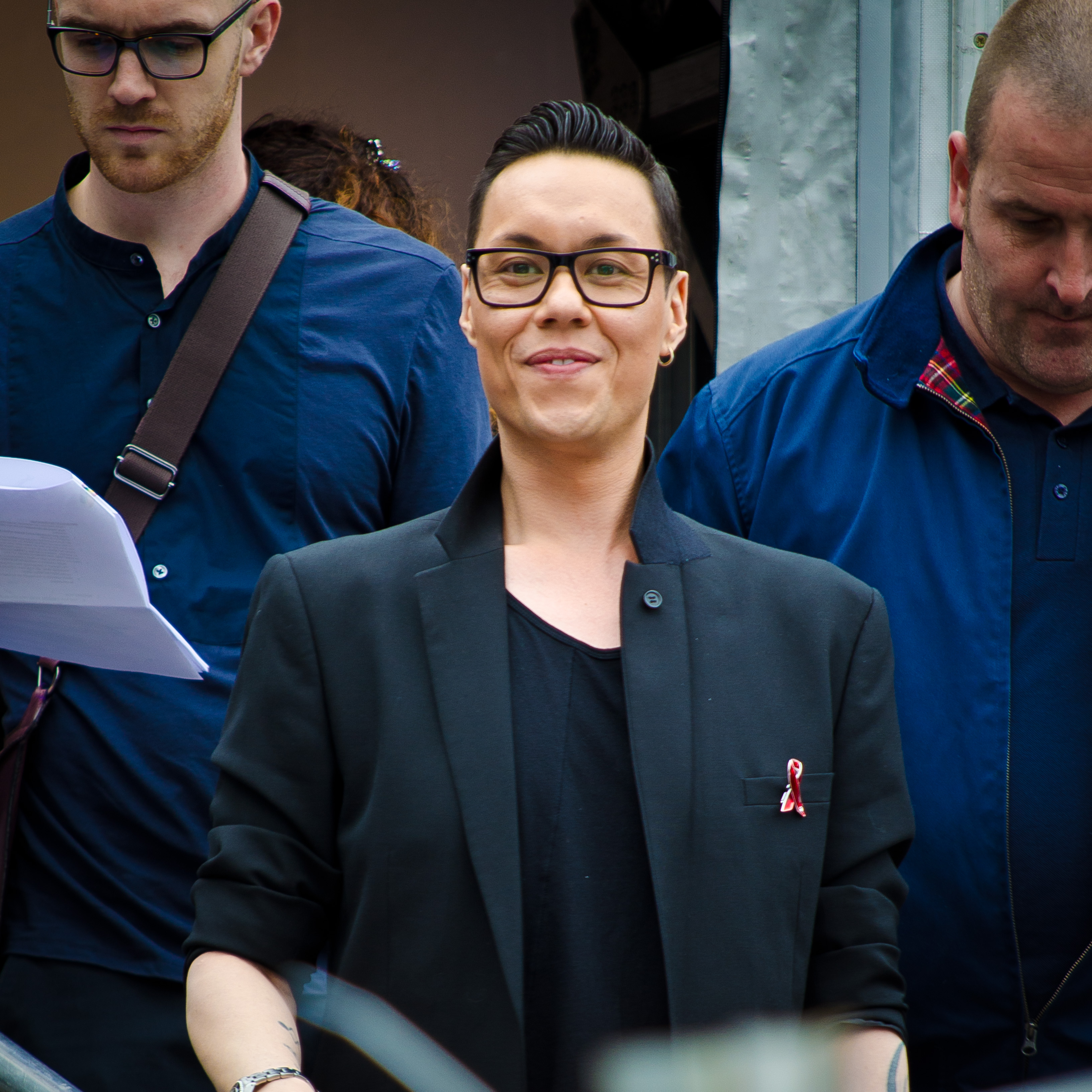
Gok Wan

- Suki Chan, British Chinese artist
- Stanley Chow, artist and illustrator
- Aowen Jin, British Chinese artist and social commentator
- Qu Lei Lei, artist and calligrapher
- Cary Kwok, artist
- Chris Liu, fashion designer
- Beatrix Ong, luxury fashion accessory and shoe designer
- Gok Wan, fashion consultant and television presenter

== Business ==
- Andrew Ng, co-founder of education technology company Coursera, director of Stanford University's Artificial Intelligence Lab
- Sir David Tang, founder of fashion chain Shanghai Tang, socialite and writer
- Woon Wing Yip, founder of the British Chinese supermarket chain Wing Yip

== Food ==
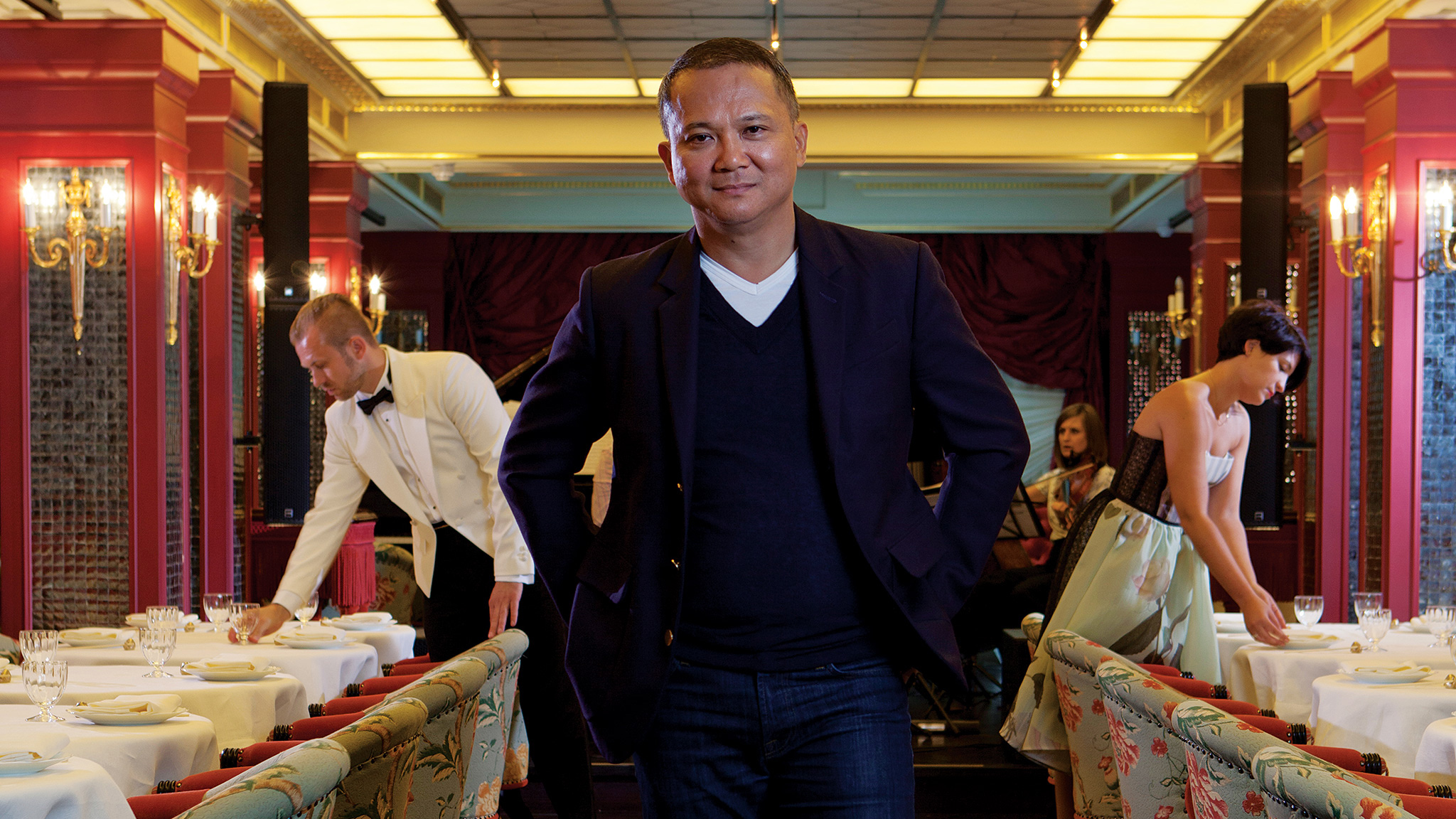
Alan Yau

- Mi Gao Huang Chen, takeaway owner who was murdered in 2005
- Michael Chow, British-American restaurateur
- Kim-Joy Hewlett, baker, cookbook author, and finalist in the ninth series of The Great British Bake Off, of Chinese Malaysian descent
- Ching-He Huang, food broadcaster and food writer
- Nancy Lam, chef
- Kenneth Lo, writer of more than 30 Chinese cookbooks
- Willian "Bill" Poon, chef and restaurateur
- Alan Yau, restaurateur, founder of Wagamama, Hakkasan and Yauatcha

== Music ==
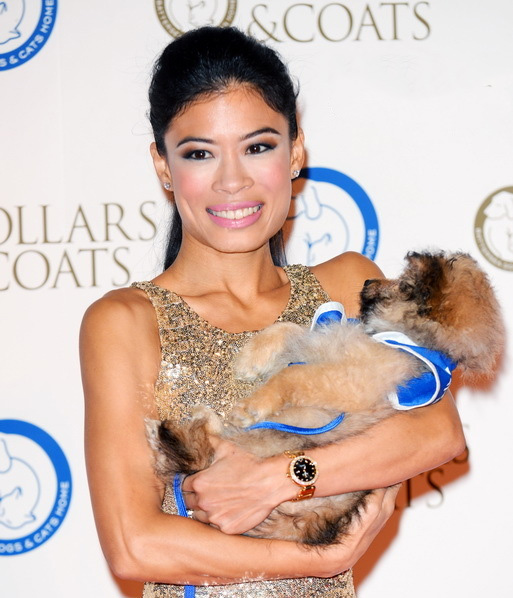
Vanessa-Mae

- Roy Henry Bowyer-Yin (1910–2010), Anglican clergyman known for introducing a tradition of choral music to Ceylon (now Sri Lanka); left an abiding musical presence in Sri Lanka; younger brother of Leslie Charteris
- Central Cee, rapper
- Jacob Collier, singer, songwriter, multi-instrumentalist, producer and educator
- Ayi Jihu (born 1984), singer
- Jason Lai, orchestral conductor
- Herman Li, of the power metal band DragonForce
- Zilan Liao, guzheng, concert harp and director of Pagoda arts
- Melvyn Tan, classical pianist
- Jasmine Thompson, singer
- Fou Ts'ong, pianist
- KT Tunstall, musician
- Vanessa-Mae, violinist
- Jamie Woon, dubstep artist
- Reuben Wu, musician, photographer, and artist, best known as a former member of the electropop band Ladytron
- Raymond Yiu, composer
- Cheng Yu, pipa and guqin musician
- Guo Yue, dizi and bawu musician

== Politics ==
- Michael Chan, Baron Chan, politician, life peer in the House of Lords
- Steven Dominique Cheung, Diana Award winner, youngest candidate for the European Election in 2009, DJ of Spectrum Radio and SW1 Radio
- Sonny Leong, Baron Leong, politician, life peer in the House of Lords
- James Lindsay, 3rd Baron Lindsay of Birker, hereditary peer in the House of Lords, born to British father and Chinese mother
- Alan Mak, member of Parliament for Havant since 2015, first British Chinese member of the House of Commons
- Sarah Owen, member of Parliament for Luton North
- Nat Wei, Baron Wei, social entrepreneur, former government advisor and member of the House of Lords
- Yuan Yang, member of Parliament for Earley and Woodley

== Sport ==
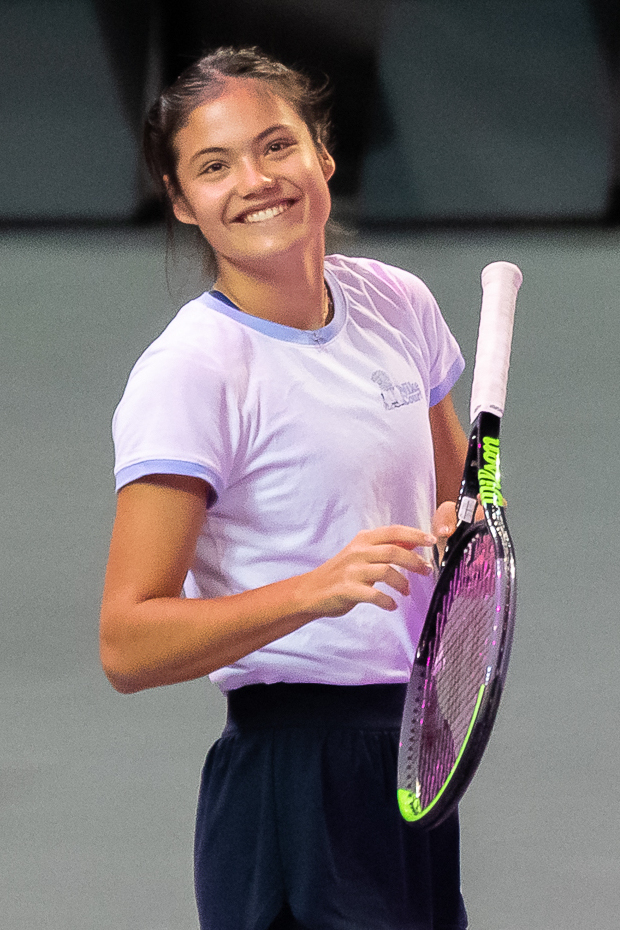
Emma Raducanu

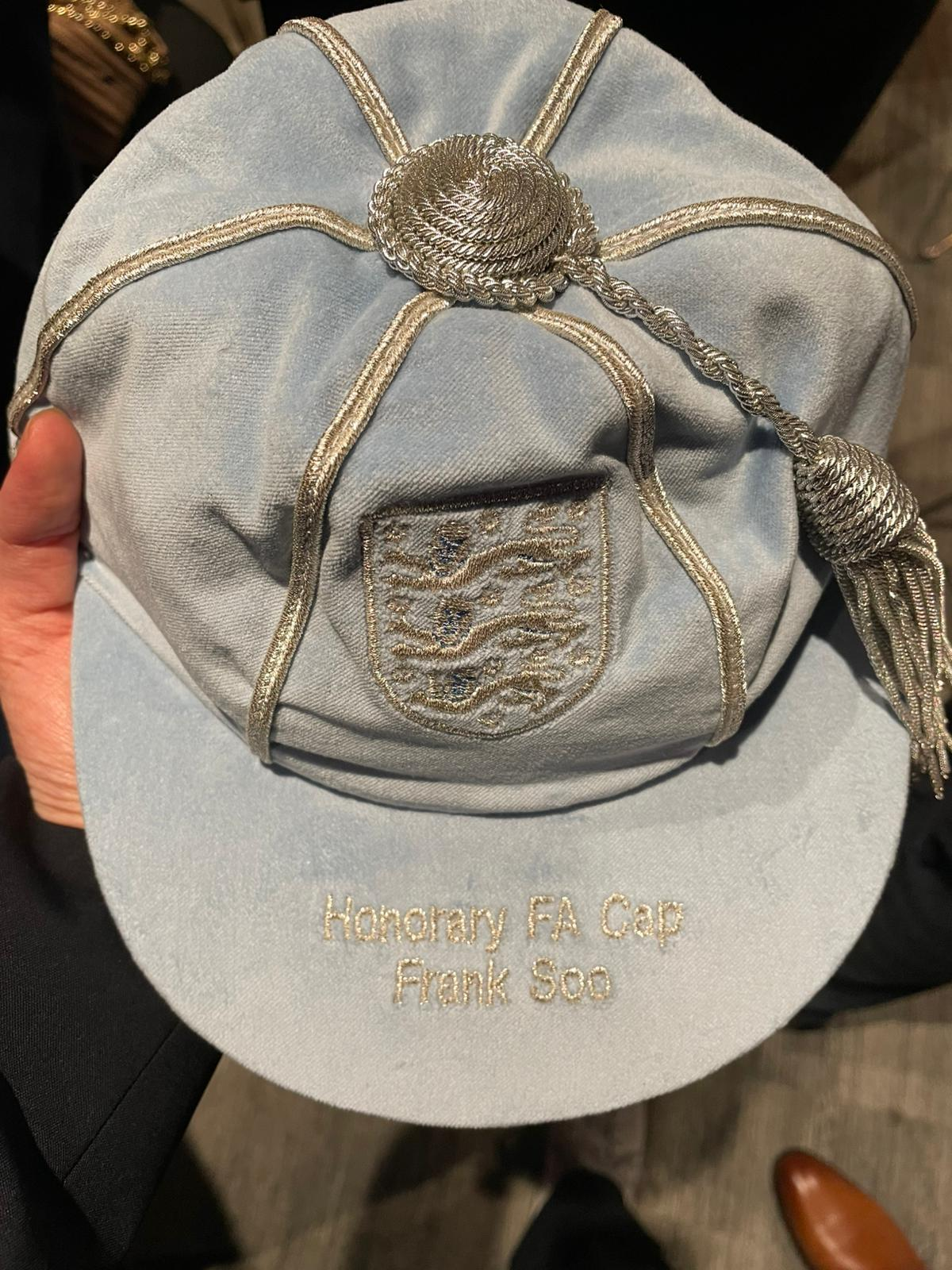
Frank Soo's Honorary England Cap, presented to the Frank Soo Foundation and Soo family on 9 October 2025

- Tyias Browning (also known as Jiang Guangtai), footballer, gave up his British citizenship to play for the Chinese national team; Chinese from his maternal grandfather
- Eden Cheng, British diver
- Joe Choong, British Olympic gold medal-winning pentathlete
- Sammy Chung, second person of Chinese descent to manage an English football league club
- Gem Hoahing, tennis player, born in British Hong Kong and grew up in Twickenham, took part in 19 Wimbledon Championships
- Brian Moore, former English rugby union rugby player
- Sam Quek, England and British Olympic gold medal-winning field hockey player, television presenter with Singaporean-Chinese heritage
- Emma Raducanu, British tennis player
- Frank Soo, first player of Chinese descent to play in the Football League, and the first non-white player to represent England
- Alex Hua Tian, Olympic event rider, gave up his British citizenship in order to compete in the 2008 Beijing Olympics as part of the Chinese team
- Rory Underwood, former English rugby union rugby player; Eurasian
- Tony Underwood, former rugby union player, brother of Rory Underwood
- Issy Wong, England cricketer
- Alex Yee, Olympic gold medallist in triathlon
- Nico Yennaris, footballer, gave up his British citizenship to play for the Chinese national team; Eurasian

== Television ==
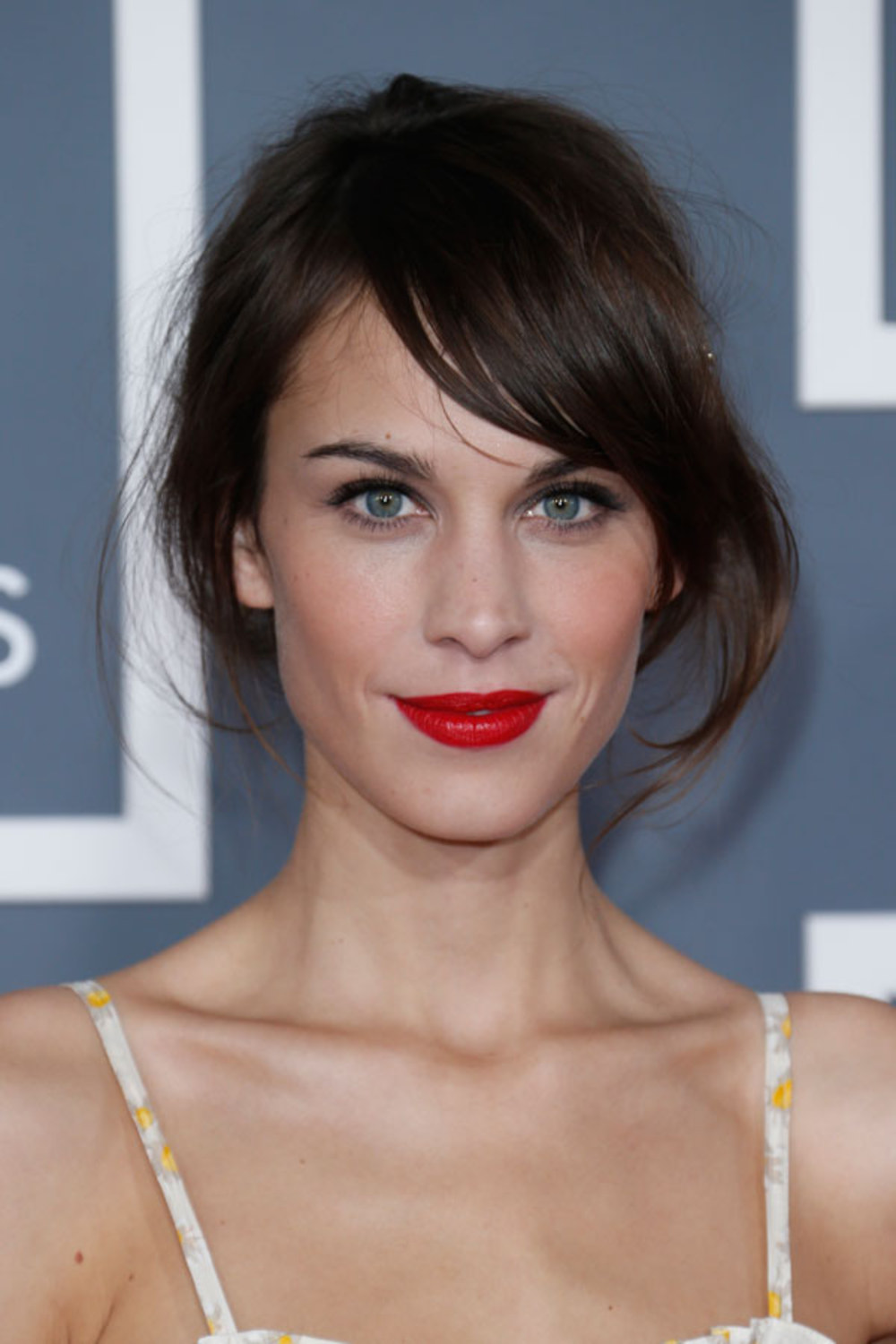
Alexa Chung

- Alexa Chung, TV presenter, fashion model, contributing editor at British Vogue; Eurasian

== Writers ==
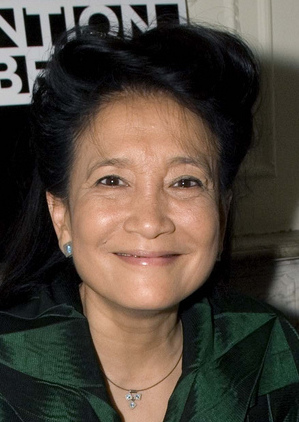
Jung Chang

- Jung Chang, writer, co-author of the biography Mao: The Unknown Story
- Leslie Charteris, writer and creator of antihero Simon Templar, alias The Saint
- Sue Cheung, novelist and illustrator of children's book
- Anhua Gao, writer
- Jo Ho, screenwriter, director, and first Chinese person in the UK to create a television drama series, the 2010 BBC fantasy Spirit Warriors
- Sarah Howe FRSL (b. 1983), British Chinese poet, editor and researcher in English literature; her first full poetry collection, Loop of Jade (2015), won the T. S. Eliot Prize and the Sunday Times / Peters Fraser + Dunlop Young Writer of The Year Award
- Hsiung Shih-I, writer, became the first Chinese person to write and direct a West End play in 1935
- Timothy Mo, British novelist
- Chee Soo, author and teacher on Taoism, traditional Chinese medicine and martial arts
- Xue Xinran, broadcaster, author and founder of the charity Mother's Bridge of Love
- Benjamin Yeoh, playwright

== See also ==
- Chinese clan
- Overseas Chinese
- List of overseas Chinese
- List of Chinese Americans
- List of Chinese Australians
- List of Chinese Canadians
- List of Chinese Filipinos
- List of Malaysian Chinese
- List of Chinese New Zealanders
