= List of people associated with Birkbeck, University of London =

This article is a list of people associated with Birkbeck, University of London, including alumni, members of faculty and fellows.

== Current and former faculty ==
- Georgios Alogoskoufis, Greek Minister of Economy and Finance from March 2004 till January 2009.
- Anthony Bale, medievalist
- Julia Bell, author
- J. D. Bernal, pioneer of X-ray crystallography
- Derek Barton, organic chemist and Nobel Laureate for Chemistry, 1969
- Antony Beevor, historian
- Patrick Blackett, professor and Nobel Laureate for Physics, 1948
- Sir Tom Blundell, crystallographer, FRS
- David Bohm, quantum physicist
- Andrew Donald Booth, head of Numerical Automation
- Kathleen Booth née Britten, computer scientist
- C. Delisle Burns (1879-1942), atheist and secularist writer and lecturer
- Ian Christie, professor of film and media history
- Steven Connor, professor
- Ian Crawford, Professor of Planetary Science and Astrobiology
- Diana Coole, social scientist
- Costas Douzinas, law professor
- T. S. Eliot, Nobel Laureate for Literature 1948, publisher, playwright, literary and social critic
- Hilda Ellis Davidson, academic and English antiquarian
- Martina Evans, poet
- Richard J. Evans, Regius Professor of Modern History at Cambridge
- Martin Paul Eve, professor
- Dame Millicent Fawcett, suffragist
- Orlando Figes, professor of history
- Ben Fine, professor
- Rosalind Franklin, crystallographer
- Hugh Gaitskell, lecturer
- Caroline Goodson, medievalist
- A. C. Grayling, philosopher
- Vittorio Grilli, Italy's economy and finances minister (Monti cabinet) from 2012 to 2013.
- Richard Hamblyn, lecturer in creative writing
- Vanessa Harding, professor of London history
- Basil Hiley, quantum physicist and emeritus professor
- Paul Hirst, professor
- Eric Hobsbawm, professor of History
- Thomas Hodgskin, lecturer in economic theory
- Kenneth Holmes, crystallographer
- Elizabeth Hounsell, carbohydrate scientist
- C. E. M. Joad, Reader in Philosophy, author and popular broadcaster
- Mark Johnson, professor
- Charlotte Jolles, Professor, historian
- Russell Celyn Jones, professor of creative writing
- Annette Karmiloff-Smith, professor
- Anthony Julius, visiting professor
- Aaron Klug, crystallographer and Nobel Laureate for Chemistry, 1982
- Jon Lansman, Labour Party activist
- Gail Lewis, academic and activist
- Toby Litt, author, lecturer
- Joni Lovenduski, political scientist
- Mark Mazower, Ira D. Wallach Professor of History at Columbia University
- Louis Mordell, researcher in mathematics
- Laura Mulvey, professor of film and media studies
- Jeremy K. Nicholson, professor of biological chemistry
- Roger Penrose, theoretical physicist and Nobel Laureate for Physics, 2020
- Nikolaus Pevsner, professor
- Ben Pimlott, professor
- Lucy Riall, historian
- Helen Saibil, molecular biologist
- Roger Scruton, professor
- Lynne Segal, professor
- Colin Teevan, professor of playwriting
- Dame Janet Thornton, structural bioinformatics, Director EBI
- Li Wei, academic, linguist
- Ralph Vaughan Williams, lecturer, composer
- Kalpana Wilson, author, researcher, lecturer
- Tony Wright, politician, distinguished professor at Birkbeck
- Slavoj Žižek, philosopher

== Presidents ==
The following have served as President of Birkbeck:

- 1823–1841: George Birkbeck (founder of Birkbeck)
- 1841–1888: William Lloyd Birkbeck
- 1888–1897: Thomas Baring, 1st Earl of Northbrook
- 1903–1915: Lord Alverstone
- 1919–1928: Viscount Haldane
- 1929–1933: Harry Levy-Lawson, 1st Viscount Burnham
- 1935–1936: The Duke of York (later King George VI)
- 1942–1944: William Temple (Archbishop of Canterbury)
- 1947–1950: Field-Marshal Archibald Wavell, 1st Earl Wavell
- 1952–1983: Lord Denning
- 1983–1989: Baroness Lockwood
- 1989–1993: Lord Young of Dartington
- 1993–1998: Lord Healey
- 1998-2002: Baroness Smith of Gilmorehill
- 2002-2012: Eric Hobsbawm
- 2012-present: Baroness Bakewell

== Masters and Vice Chancellors ==
- John Redcliffe Maud (1939–1943)
- E.H. Warmington (acting, 1950–1951)
- John Lockwood (1951–1965; Vice-Chancellor of the University of London 1955–1958)
- E.H. Warmington (acting, 1965–1966)
- Kenneth Hare (1966–1968)
- Ronald Tress (1968–1977)
- Tessa Blackstone, Baroness Blackstone (1987–1997; Vice-Chancellor of University of Greenwich)
- Timothy O'Shea (1998–2002; Principal of the University of Edinburgh)
- David Latchman (2003–2023)
- Sally Wheeler (since 2024)

== Alumni ==
- Chris Abani, writer
- Kemi Badenoch, politician and Member of Parliament, candidate for Leader of the Conservative Party and Prime Minister of the United Kingdom
- Marian Bell, economist; former member of the Monetary Policy Committee
- Luciana Berger, politician and Member of Parliament
- Annie Besant, theosophist
- Simon Bird, actor and comedian
- Mukhlesur Rahman Chowdhury, politician, editor, Minister and former Adviser to the President of Bangladesh
- Oliver Chris, actor
- Alex Corbisiero, England and British Lions rugby player
- Beth Cordingly, actress
- David Cox, statistician
- Bernard Crick, political theorist
- Juliet Davenport, businesswoman
- Alan Davey, civil servant; current Chief executive of British Arts Council
- Edward Davey, politician and Member of Parliament
- Dido, singer
- Jennifer Donnelly, writer
- Samir El-Youssef, writer
- Tracey Emin, artist
- Nissim Ezekiel, professor, poet
- Rachel Glennerster, economist, Chief Economist at the Department for International Development
- Tomás González Estrada, Colombian politician, former minister of energy
- Marcus Garvey, founder Universal Negro Improvement Association and African Communities League
- Eliane Glaser, writer, broadcaster
- Julia Goldsworthy, politician; former Liberal Democrat MP for Falmouth and Camborne
- Bear Grylls, adventurer, author and television presenter
- John Joseph Haldane, philosopher
- Frank Hartley, vice-chancellor of the university
- Zhu Hua, applied linguist
- Vernon Ingram, Fellow of the Royal Society
- Paul Johnson, economist, Director of Institute of Fiscal Studies
- William Joyce, deputy Leader of the British Union of Fascists, Nazi wartime broadcaster and convicted traitor
- Oliver Kamm, journalist
- James Lovelock, developer of the Gaia Hypothesis
- Ramsay MacDonald, politician; first Labour Prime Minister of the United Kingdom
- John McDonnell, politician
- Denis MacShane, politician
- Leonard Mandel, nuclear physicist
- Ehsan Masood, science writer and editor of Research Fortnight
- Ram Charan Mehrotra, organometallic chemist, Shanti Swarup Bhatnagar laureate
- Amina Memon, social and cognitive psychologist, academic, and author
- Ernest Millington, politician
- Seumas Milne, journalist and political aide
- Omeima Mudawi-Rowlings, deaf British-Sudanese textile artist based in Brighton
- Lisa Nandy, politician and Member of Parliament
- Jesse Norman, politician and Member of Parliament
- Nerina Pallot, singer
- Nick Palmer, politician and former Member of Parliament
- Arthur Wing Pinero, actor, stage director and dramatist
- Daisy Ridley, actress
- J. Philippe Rushton, psychologist
- John Rowan (psychologist), psychologist
- Jenny Rowe, Chief Executive, UK Supreme Court
- Richard Sambrook, broadcaster, formerly director of the BBC World
- Frank Sando, former International Cross-Country Champion
- Andy Saull, rugby player
- Helen Sharman, chemist and cosmonaut
- Joost Smiers, academic
- Nick Smith, politician
- Vaughan Smith, soldier, journalist, cameraman, and social entrepreneur
- Laura Solomon, writer
- Nicola Spence, Chief Plant Health Officer, Defra
- William Stanley, inventor, engineer and philanthropist
- Kim Thomson, stage, film and television actress
- Mark P. Taylor, economist, Dean of Olin Business School at Washington University in St. Louis
- Laurie Taylor, sociologist
- Tracey Thorn, pop star, singer with Everything but the Girl
- Ronald Tress, economist
- Kitty Ussher, British economist and former Labour Party politician
- Alfred Russel Wallace, naturalist, explorer, geographer, anthropologist, and biologist
- Allyson Williams (midwife)
- Rob Williams, rower, silver medallist in the 2012 Summer Olympics
- Sidney Webb, 1st Baron Passfield, founder of the London School of Economics
- Jah Wobble, musician/writer
- Wai Hnin Pwint Thon, political activist
- Sidin Vadukut, columnist, writer and blogger
- Claudia Webbe, Labour MP

== Fellows ==
- Edward Davey, Secretary of State for Energy and Climate Change, Liberal Democrat Member of Parliament for Kingston and Surbiton
- Frank Dobson, Labour politician
- Dame Vivien Duffield, philanthropist
- Sir Richard J. Evans, historian
- Dame Julia Goodfellow, former Chief Executive of the Biotechnology and Biological Sciences Research Council
- Sir Peter Lampl, educationalist and philanthropist, founder of the Sutton Trust
- Leonard Wolfson, Baron Wolfson
