= John Hasted =

British physicist and folk musician (1921–2002)

- Born: John Barrett Hasted; 17 February 1921; Woodbridge, Suffolk, England
- Died: 4 May 2002 (aged 81); Penzance, Cornwall, England
- Education: Winchester College; New College, Oxford
- Occupations: Physicist, folk musician, parapsychologist, writer

John Barrett Hasted (17 February 1921 – 4 May 2002) was a British physicist and folk musician. He was born in Woodbridge, Suffolk, on 17 February 1921, the son of John Ord Cobbold Hasted and Phyllis Barrett. He was a pioneer of radar development and an atomic physicist, but he was also a pioneer and mainstay of the post-war English folk music revival, a founder and champion of the skiffle movement, and a passionate advocate for both traditional and political folksong.

== Biography ==
Hasted obtained a scholarship to study at Winchester College, where he won the science prize for developing a method of measuring velocity and distance by means of reflected sound waves, which in effect is a principle later used in radar and sonar technology. He won a scholarship to study Chemistry as an undergraduate at New College, Oxford. While there he also won a choral scholarship and was part of the New College Choir.

It was during his time in the Choir that he was introduced to the music of Vaughan Williams and other composers who drew their inspiration from English folksong. A lifelong love of folksong was born in him during those years. In 1940 he met Alan Bush, who became Hasted's first musical mentor. It was during his time in Oxford that his political interests were awakened, and his ideals were drawn to the left of the political spectrum. His musical development continued, and inspired by Alan Bush he soon joined the Workers Music Association, and took part in the WMA Summer School which was to become a very important gathering where some of the most distinguished British singers, composers, conductors, collectors and scholars of folk music, orchestral and brass players and jazz musicians could share their skills and expertise with students from all sectors of society and pass on their knowledge and ideas to the next generation.

Inspired by what he learnt at the WMA, Hasted founded his own Oxford Workers' and Students' Choir and they performed spirituals, labour movement anthems, and other material with political and social content. During this time, World War 2 was raging and Hasted's studies and musical activities were interrupted when he joined the British army in 1941. His scientific knowledge of reflected sound waves did not pass unnoticed and he was soon detailed to work with Charles Percy Snow, C.P. Snow, and sent to join a specialist team of "radio officers" working on the development and improvement of radar at Richmond Park. This work was very secret and of great importance to the war effort.

Hasted's understanding and ideas on the technical possibilities of sound waves meant he was later sent to a Research Station in Malvern where he worked with a specialist team on the development of a portable radar set which had to be efficient as well as compact and most importantly, hardy and durable to withstand transporting to a warzone, be it by wheeled vehicles or being air dropped by parachute or in a glider for later assembly and use. During his time at the Malvern research station, Hasted met Professor Frederick Lindemann (later Lord Cherwell), who was Winston Churchill's scientific adviser.

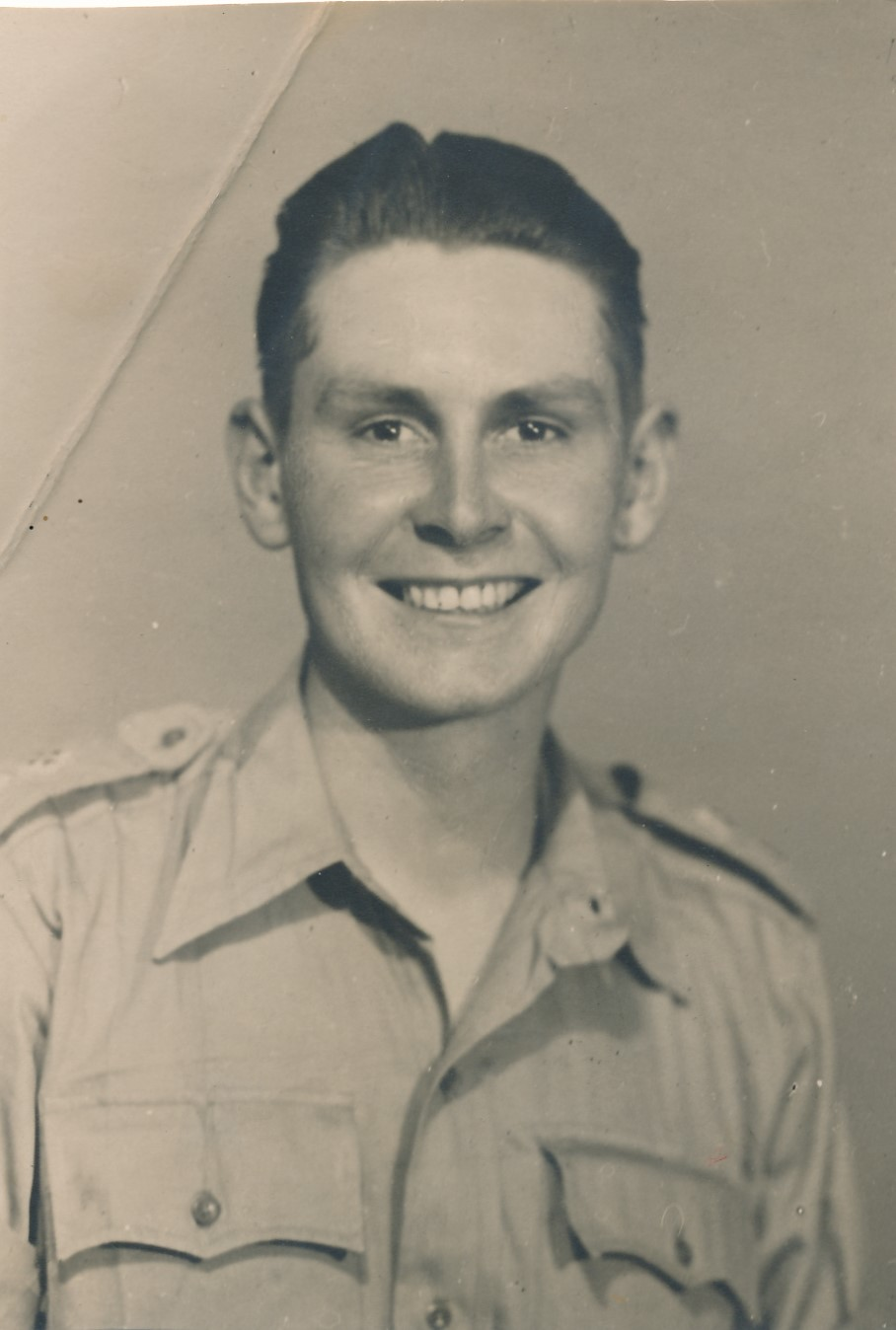
Lt. John Barrett Hasted in North Africa, 1942

In 1942 Hasted was transferred to the active war zone of North Africa. He was deployed as a specialist wireless maintenance officer and was also responsible for installing the upgraded radar equipment in Alexandria (Egypt) and later in Malta. This last posting was of vital importance as a fierce battle had been raging from June 1940 to November 1942 for the control of this strategically important island. During this time, the air and naval forces of Fascist Italy and Nazi Germany fought against the Royal Air Force (RAF) and the Royal Navy. It was through radar that the Maltese defences were able to know in advance that enemy aircraft were on their way, also the number of planes and from which direction. The upgraded system Hasted installed could actually monitor them from the moment they took off from Sicily.

Hasted later took part in the Italian campaign, serving in the same regiment as Dr. Donald Hughes, a musician-educator who would also play a part in the post-war folksong revival.

When the war ended in 1945 and a general election was called in Britain, Hasted voted Labour like so many people, tired of war and hopeful of a bright, peaceful future. This saw the coming to power of the first Labour government with an overall majority. With the fighting over, he was demobbed and returned to his studies in Oxford.

Hasted returned to Oxford as a doctoral student working on microwave physics. He studied with Lindemann at Clarendon Laboratory, which is part of the Department of Physics at Oxford University. It houses the atomic and laser physics, condensed matter physics, and biophysics groups within the Department.

Alongside his interest in atomic energy, Hasted continued his musical pursuits and in 1946 he happened to hear an Almanac Singers' vinyl record that a friend had picked up in New York. The sound he heard made him realise that this was the kind of music that he wanted to sing and play. He wrote in his autobiography, Alternative Memoirs, "The Almanac Singers were the outcome of a whole tradition, entirely different from our own: group singing, to the accompaniment of two guitars and a five string banjo. It was just as the Carter Family had done it Bob Hinds, a merchant seaman, had brought the Almanacs 78rpm record 'Talking Union' for me to hear in 1946. I at once wanted to make music like this."

His studies kept him very busy. He also realised that involvement in politics would hinder his studies and career so he put them aside for a time. He completed his doctorate successfully and later moved to London where he met other music-minded enthusiastic people who were interested in his ideas of attempting to combine folk music and left-wing politics.

== Professional career and folk music ==
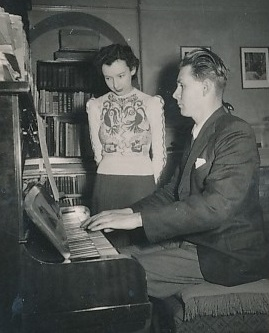
John & Elizabeth Hasted, at the piano in their flat in Nottinghill Gate, 1949

It was in 1948 that Hasted first began to play a significant role in the post-war English folksong revival. He met and married Elizabeth Gregson, who was studying English at St Anne's College, Oxford. They made their home in Notting Hill Gate and in September 1949 their twin daughters were born. Hasted obtained a post in the Physics Department of University College, London, where he carried out detailed research on ions and on atomic collisions with Sir Harrie Massey who was Quain Professor of Physics and head of the University College London, Physics Department. Hasted worked with other researchers and succeeded in establishing UCL's reputation as a major centre for atomic physics. But Hasted did not forget his love of folk music. And in his spare time he joined Alan Bush's choir, the Workers' Music Association Singers, and later on formed his own group, Topic Singers.

This led to a joint project with the Labour Movement Theatre Group on a political musical revue performed at the Unity Theatre. It was during 1948 and 1949 that Hasted frequented the Leicester Square Jazz Club to hear such pioneers of the English traditional jazz revival as George Webb, Graeme Bell, and the Christie Brothers Stompers who were one of the most influential British New Orleans-style jazz bands of the early '50s.

A key moment in Hasted's music life took place when he met Albert Lancaster Lloyd. Commonly called Bert Lloyd, he was an English folk singer and collector of folk songs, and as such was a key figure in the British folk revival of the 1950s and 1960s. The lifelong friendship that was formed endured throughout their lives, despite some later differences of opinion on the path that the revival should follow. They also happened to share similar political opinions. Together the two men planned to form an Almanac-type folk group.

In his memoirs, Hasted described his meeting with Bert Lloyd like this: "It was years before I could even get hold of a folk guitar, let alone find other people with similar aspirations. Eventually I found folklorist Bert Lloyd and asked him if he wanted to start an Almanac group in England. To my astonishment his voice dropped about an octave, and he said very quietly "Passionately".

To be able to produce the sound he wanted, Hasted searched London in his quest for a suitable classic acoustic guitar. He eventually found a Martin guitar, an American manufactured instrument with an established pedigree for quality. He then started to learn how to play. He then wrote to People's Songs, an organization founded by Pete Seeger, Alan Lomax, Lee Hays, among others on December 31, 1945, in New York City, to "create, promote, and distribute songs of labour and the American people". Hasted asked them for copies of mimeographed instructional materials on playing the acoustic guitar compiled by Pete Seeger. Once he received these, he taught himself to play the guitar. Once he had mastered the basics, he also bought a five-string banjo and turned his hand to playing it too.

During this time Hasted's politics had also changed, he had seen how the Labour government of Clement Attlee had failed to bring about the social reform he and many other voters in 1945 had hoped for and supported. By 1949 his disillusionment led him to join the Communist Party, and that same year, he led a brigade of British youths on a visit to Yugoslavia, where they had volunteered to help reconstruct roads and railways destroyed by the war. His wife, Elizabeth, accompanied him despite being heavily pregnant at the time.

He took the opportunity to research local folk songs and he learnt a number of Serbo-Croat folksongs which he eventually incorporated into his musical repertoire. One of these songs was an ode to Josip Broz Tito, president of Yugoslavia. The simplicity of the song made it easy to follow and it did not take long for Hasted to add a further verse to it and encourage the British youths to sing along. The song went like this:

"Druje Tito, oy, Druji Tito / Lyublicici byela" ("Comrade Tito, oy, comrade Tito, / Our little white violet").

"Harry Pollitt, oi, Harry Pollitt, / Our little red geranium", or, more frivolously, "Mary Gibson, oi, Mary Gibson, / Burnt the stew last Tuesday".

Once back in Britain, Hasted's friendship with Bert Lloyd and their shared idea of forming a folk group came to fruition in the early' 50s. The group was called The Ramblers and they performed at trade union functions and demonstrations, but apparently never made any recordings. The members of the group were Bert Lloyd, John Hasted, Neste Revald, a guitarist, and Jean Butler, an American girl who brought lots of experience singing with a five-string banjo for American Unions and had often performed with the Almanacs. The inspiration for the group's name came from a song by Woody Guthrie "Ramblin' Round" which Jean Butler had sung for them.

In Alternative Memoirs, Hasted mentions that "The Ramblers lasted only a few of years as a group, but the sound we made was solid, since Bert had a high-up voice, and I was bass baritone. Jean's voice and banjo were authentic Almanac. But we never possessed or sang into a tape-recorder or even a wire-recorder. Only the SSC had those, and we were not exactly their territory, not even in the archive library We sang both American and British material, and we often wrote new words One day Jean sang for us the entire Tom Joad ballad of Woody Guthrie, possibly one of the finest ballads to have come from the New World. This was its first performance outside the USA. It is sung to the tune of John Hardy. ... Searching through the original Negro Spiritual Songbooks of the Jubilee Singers, who performed all over Europe to finance Fisk University, the first for Negroes, I had found several songs I'd never heard in England. Our London Youth Choir put them into service straight away. "We shall not be moved", "Down by the Riverside (Ain't Goin' Study War no More)", and the one I knew as a Trad Jazz tune, "When the Saints go Marching in". Our performances may well have been the channel through which these songs passed into the European Folk Tradition.

Hasted's musical passion made him want to share the folk song revival he was involved in with young people, and popularise this genre of music, and in 1951, together with his friend Eric Winter and Leon Rosselson, he formed Britain's first modern folk group, the London Youth Choir, which he conducted throughout the fifties. The Youth Choir took part in the 3rd World Festival of Youth and Students (WFYS) which was held from 5 to 19 August 1951 in Berlin, capital city of the then German Democratic Republic. The Festival took place during a period of growing international tension between the Soviet Union and the western powers. It was around this time that Hasted wrote his first political folksong, "Go Home Yankee". He continued putting his political ideas to music by writing songs titled "Talking Rearmament", "When Asia Came to Geneva", "Conscripts Forward!" and "Ballad of the Daily Worker". These songs can be described as "agitprop" as they were designed to spread information and knowledge to people and persuade the general public to support and share certain ideals.

Hasted was a regular participant in Workers Music Association summer schools, these were held at Wortley Hall, near Sheffield after a group of local trade union activists identified the hall as a possible educational and holiday centre and established a co-operative which succeeded in purchasing the hall for those purposes. It was formally opened on 5 May 1951. And since then, has been associated with the British trade union and wider labour movement. By attending these summer music schools Hasted started meeting and forming friendships with other left-wing folksingers, including Karl Frederick Dallas and Eric Winter, whom he first met in 1953.

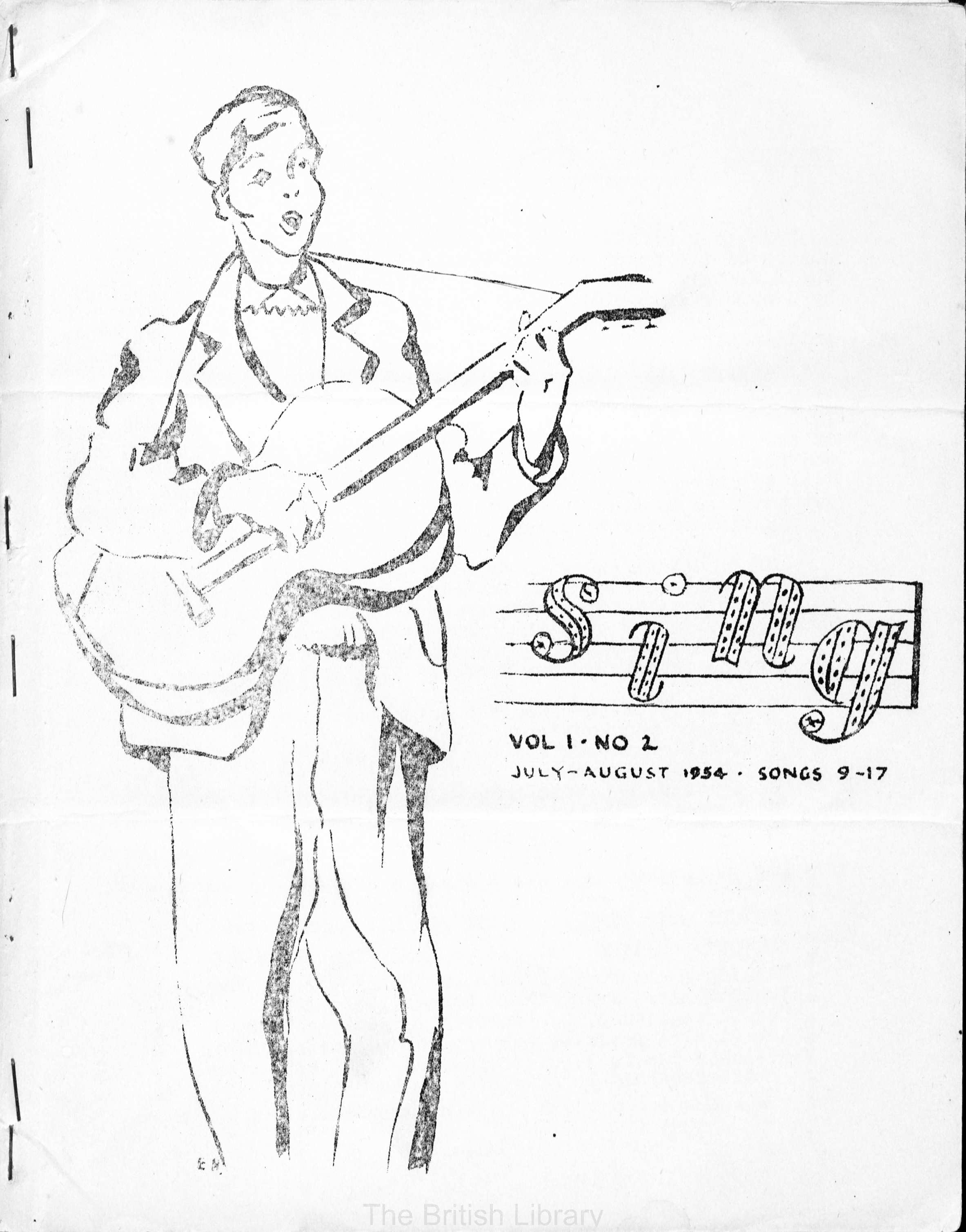
Sing Magazine Vol 1 no 2 July August 1954 - Elizabeth Hasted illustrator

At the suggestion of Hasted, together with John Ambrose, Eric Winter founded Britain's first folk magazine, Sing, which was to run for twenty years (1954 – 1974). The collaboration between Hasted and Eric produced a successful English folksong magazine which was an effective rival to English Dance and Song, which was the official bulletin of the rather old-fashioned English Folk Dance & Song Society.

Sing was deliberately modelled on the American Sing Out, and the first issue appeared in May-June 1954. Hasted was the music editor. He wrote a column about the London folk scene and contributed songs that he had written. He also looked around for new songs from other political folk singers across the country. Hasted also reviewed publications by other stalwarts of the folksong revival, such as Ewan MacColl's small book of industrial songs, The Shuttle and the Cage. Ewan McColl is credited as founding England's first folk club in London in 1953. It was called Ballads and Blues, which later became The Singers' Club, and finally closed in 1991.

The folk music revival seemed to be gaining strength when in 1954 Hasted founded a folk club called The Good Earth. It was located in the heart of London at 44 Gerrard St., and Hasted was soon to be found there, singing and playing his banjo and guitar. He also had great enthusiasm for traditional jazz which meant he followed the activities of the Ken Colyer Jazz Band, which had now begun to feature a skiffle group in its club dates. Skiffle is a genre of folk music with influences from American folk music, blues, country, bluegrass, and jazz, generally performed with a mixture of manufactured and homemade or improvised instruments. It became extremely popular in Britain in the 1950s. An offshoot of the Colyer group, the Chris Barber Band, did the same, with Tony Donegan on banjo. Hasted loved the mix of Leadbelly and Woody Guthrie songs they performed and was soon leading his own John Hasted Skiffle & Folksong Group, which included Redd Sullivan, Martin Windsor, Shirley Collins, Marion Amiss, John Cole, Judith Goldbloom, Chaim Morris, and others.

Hasted was one of the earliest champions of skiffle and wrote enthusiastically about it in his irregular "A Singer's Notebook" column in Sing. He saw skiffle as a do-it-yourself music that appealed to city youth, a modern and urban form of folk music that could give traditional vernacular song a new lease of life and yet also serve the labour movement. Its effect on the teenage urban youth was evident as there soon appeared the first youth movements based around music in the country. At that time, in London, this was the soundtrack favoured by teenagers, not rock and roll, that made its way across the Atlantic from the USA later.

Sometime later the Good Earth club changed its name to the Forty-Four Skiffle Club in Soho. In Hasted's memoirs he recalls "How strange skiffle must have sounded to American ears, with all the differences of expression, accent, musical habit, even melody, that the young British imposed. Working with me were two strongly contrasted singers, Redd Sullivan, who would have wanted nothing more than to have travelled with Leadbelly; and Shirley Collins, the girl with the pure Sussex bell-like voice. How could these two ever sing together? I can only indicate how each would react to the same material. Consider 'The Gallows Pole' When Leadbelly, or indeed, Redd Sullivan sang the song, the choice of life or death would depend on the mood of the singer. But when Shirley sang the song it would be an English ballad in the form "0 the Prickle-i-bush That pricks my heart full sore, In ever get out of the prickle-i-bush I'll never get in it no more." The symbolism would assume such importance that the audience never unravelled the mystery of who killed who, or why I had splendid individual singers, but how did they ever combine together in a group? Only the simplest of harmonies, no barber's shop training, or the individuality would be lost. After all, there was no prospect of a professional career for a skiffle group when we started out. So, individuality was maintained".

The magazine Sing reflected a rather radical vision of the folksong revival that Hasted and Eric Winter had started. Its pages contained political songs and practical advice on how to play guitar or construct a washtub bass, yet they also included lots of traditional material, often contributed by Bert Lloyd. In Hasted's own repertoire he often included some traditional songs, some of which he had occasionally collected in the field by talking to people who remembered popular songs that had never been written down. "Byker Hill", "The Methody Parson" and "The Young Sailor Cut Down in His Prime" are just three of the vernacular songs we owe to his efforts to recover the workers' music of the past.

Song collecting and sharing was an important part of the folk revival in the 1950s, and Hasted mentioned in his memoirs: "SING magazine afforded us the opportunity to print songs that we had collected 'in the field' - that is, folksong material from singers in the countryside or the industrial North. Collecting with magnetic tape recorders was only just beginning, the first machines were expensive and heavy, and there was not always electrical power in country cottages.. .. At first I collected songs by the old method of copying the words and music out on a notepad whilst the singer was singing them. Singers had been more patient with 'dictation' to Cecil Sharp than we found them to be fifty years later. I soon devised a shorthand of my own, but even so I couldn't easily keep up with the singers. One session up in Eskdale became inextricably entangled with the annual docking of lambs' tails. 'I can dock they tails quicker tha what 'ee can lam they songs' and blood spilt all over the notebook."

As the folk song revival gained momentum, it gave rise to many questions such as how much emphasis be should put on singing British material. Some members of the group favoured English songs primarily and suggested performing them in local dialect and in the traditional style. However, there were others who preferred to sing the blues with only slight concessions to the English idiom. Hasted found himself straddling these extremes, as he loved the music of Leadbelly and Woody Guthrie, but he also favoured the melodies of traditional ballads and the heritage of industrial song. In 1954, he was the musical director for Unity Theatre's production of Dick Diamond's Reedy River, a celebration of the 1891 Australian shearers' strike.

At the same time as these questions were being resolved, Hasted had not abandoned his interest in political songs and he kept working with the London Youth Choir. In 1955 the choir was invited to the Warsaw International Youth Festival, and Hasted went as its conductor. Unsurprisingly the choir did not take long to include a skiffle group as part of its performances.

In 1956, during the Suez Crisis, there were a number of demonstrations in London, and Hasted, participating in one of these was singing protest songs in Whitehall when his trusty Martin guitar was broken by an overzealous policeman. Hasted did not let this setback stop him, he set out to build his own twelve-string guitar, an instrument that was unobtainable in Britain at the time. He used the remains of his Martin guitar and parts from another old six-string.

At this time skiffle was becoming a force in English pop music, especially after the music chart success of "Rock Island Line". Hasted continued championing it as an expression of the desire to "rebuild a living, urban people's music, and an audience for it". An advert for the Topic Folk Club in 1957 announced: "Saturday Oct 19th Dr John Hasted Folk, banjo and guitar. Plays and teaches at The Topic's Saturday skiffle Session, at The Dragon & Peacock." In 1958 an advert said: "Friday Jan 31st: Tonight at The Topic Folk Club The Dragon and Peacock. Special guests from London - Dr John Hasted on 12-string guitar and banjo, with Irish traditional singer Dominic Behan."

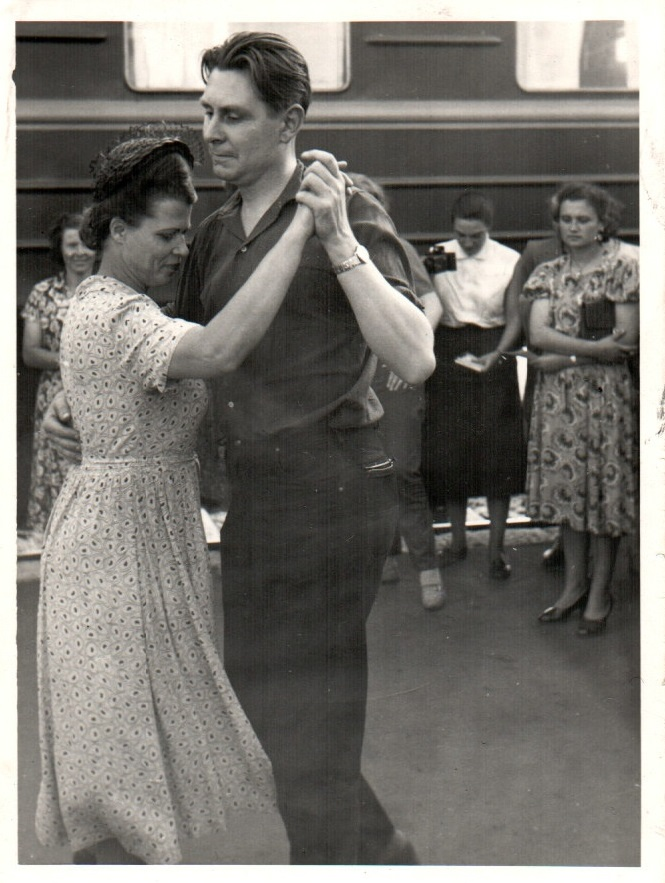
Journey to Youth Festival at Moscow 1959. Minsk Railway station, John Barrett Hasted dancing with the Mayoress of Minsk

In 1959 he was invited to take the London Youth Choir to Moscow for another international youth festival and achieved instant notoriety when the Daily Express printed a photograph of Nikita Khruschev shaking hands with the group's washboard player in Red Square.

Despite his political inclination, Hasted was a respected academic expert on atomic physics, and in 1958 he was invited to attend a scientific conference in the USA which touched on the peaceful uses of Atomic Energy, something Hasted believed in wholeheartedly. He still had time to pursue his musical interests, and while in New York he met Millard Lampell of the Weavers and folk-guitarist Jerry Silverman and visited Woody Guthrie in hospital in New Jersey. Upon his return to England, Hasted put into practice an idea that revolved around music education of young people. He convinced some friends to work with him on this project, namely Donald Hughes and Pat Shuldham-Shaw. They set up and ran weekend workshops at Battle of Britain House, near Ruislip where they taught various aspects of music, including singing and playing instruments.

As an atomic physicist who believed that using Atomic Energy for peaceful purposes could benefit all mankind, the late 1950s found him involved in the Campaign for Nuclear Disarmament. He took part in the protest marched that lasted for days on the road between the atomic weapons research facility at Aldermaston and Trafalgar Square, where the London Youth Choir performed to hundreds of thousands of demonstrators.

As often happens with large organisations, the leaders of the British peace movement disagreed over strategy, and the group split. Hasted sided with Bertrand Russell who supported the use of Gandhi type methods of civil disobedience. His own special contribution to the struggle was to house and operate the illegal pirate radio station Voice of Nuclear Disarmament, which was done in utmost secrecy. If his activities had become common knowledge it could have cost him his academic position.

He was described by many as having an inspiring personality, his sincerity and courage to stand up for what he believed in, be it his politics or his music, infused all those around him with his own incredible energy and enthusiasm. He was modest about his own abilities, and that won him a large following among left-wing youth, skifflers, and young folksingers. At the time he was thought to be the best five-string banjo player in Britain, until Peggy Seeger arrived on the London scene. People that heard him sing said he had a good voice, but Hasted was averse to being recorded as a singer because he felt self-conscious about his 'educated' accent which he believed was not the right for interpreting the folksongs he loved in the purest, most authentic form. However there are recordings where he can be heard as an accompanist, on early Shirley Collins recordings.

He had many proteges, most of whom at one time or another were members of either the London Youth Choir or his skiffle group. They included Hylda Sims, Leon Rosselson, and both Dorothy and Shirley Collins.

In 1959 he decided to concentrate more on his academic career rather than his musical pursuits. Hasted abandoned his role as one of the mainstays of Sing and took a step back from being an active musician. His last appearance at The Topic Folk club at Unity Hall Rawson Square was on 24 January 1959, in a concert by members and guests. The result was that his part in the sixties folk boom was very small. He is now virtually unknown in the folk music scene despite work he did during the 1950s revival of this genre of music.

On the other hand, in 1964 he published a major scientific work, The Physics of Atomic Collisions, and four years later was appointed Professor of Experimental Physics and head of the physics department at Birkbeck College. He continued to build upon his academic success and published many papers in scientific journals. His further scientific research and experimentation led to the publication of two other books, Aqueous Dialectrics (1973) and The Metal-Benders (1981).

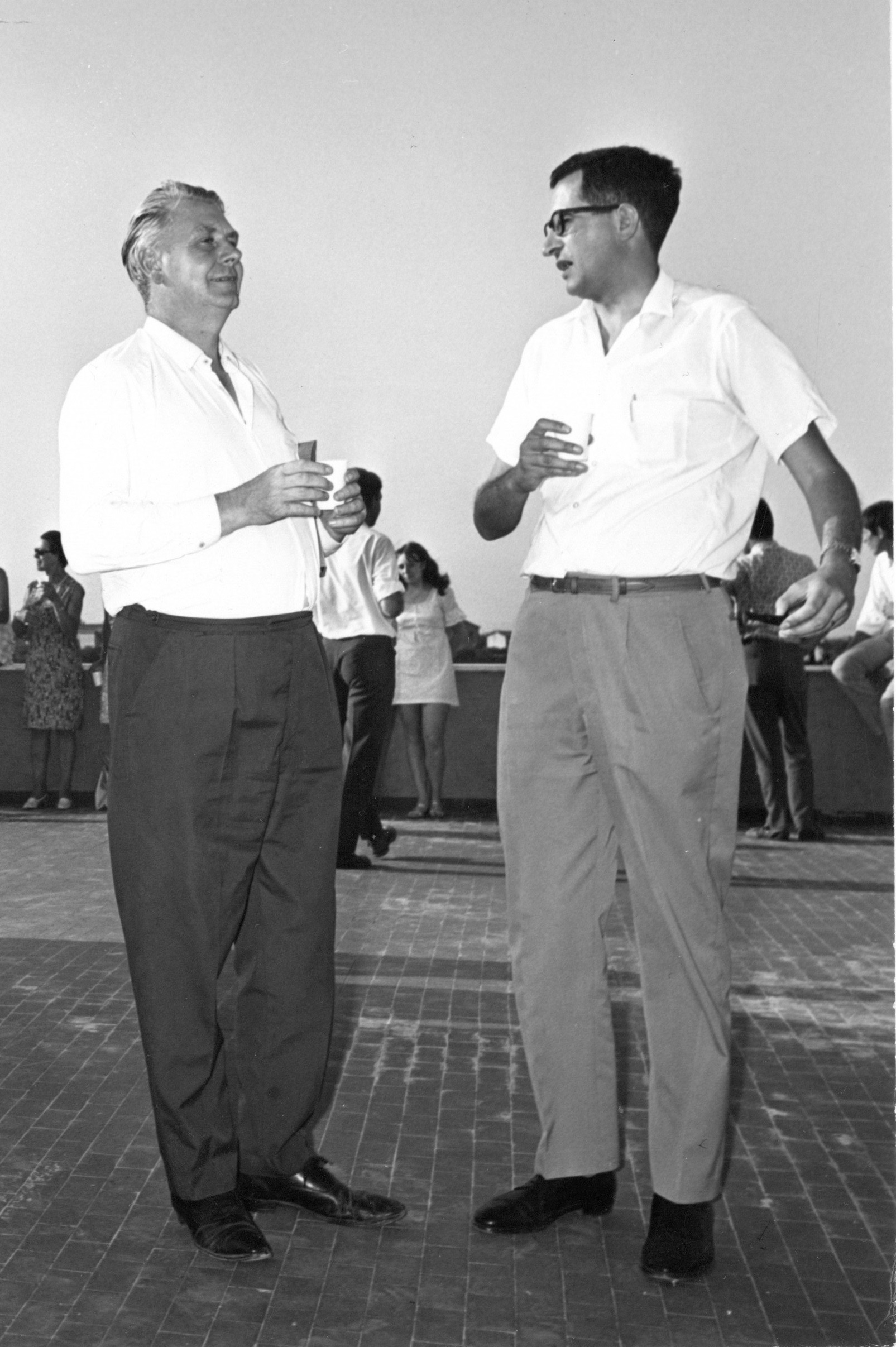
John Hasted (left) and physicist colleague at a university gathering

In Aqueous Dialectrics he presented a detailed study on dielectric theory, including topics on dielectric properties and the structure of liquid water; dielectric properties of ice; electrolytic solutions; biomolecules and tissue; aqueous solutions of non-electrolytes; dielectric properties of heterogeneous substances; dielectric properties of absorbed water; and applications to earth sciences. It was very well received in academic circles.

The book Metal Benders deals with psycho-kinetic (mind over matter) phenomena. It was not a collection of anecdotes, but a study of highly scientific data gathered while conducting some serious research with PK activity in children. The study did not focus on "how do they do it?", but instead on "what exactly happened? The study measured the amount of force that would be required to bend these pieces of metal by inserting sensors inside the metal to take measurements. The metal specimens were examined before and after, to assess the changes in crystalline structure, magnetic orientation, polarization, etc. Uri Geller was a frequent visitor at Hasted's home during this time. The book is still a favourite amongst those interested in psycho-kinetic phenomena.

Hasted retired from academic life in 1984. He decided to leave the hustle and bustle of London behind and moved to St. Ives in Cornwall. There he decided to write his memoirs of the early days of the folk music revival and the skiffle days, which resulted in Alternative Memoirs, published in 1992. He had very fond memories of the 1950s, he wrote: "I always had happy groups and happy choirs, a stimulating nightlife, and more laughter and tears than in the rest of my life".

Hasted died on 4 May 2002, in Penzance, Cornwall.

== Publications ==
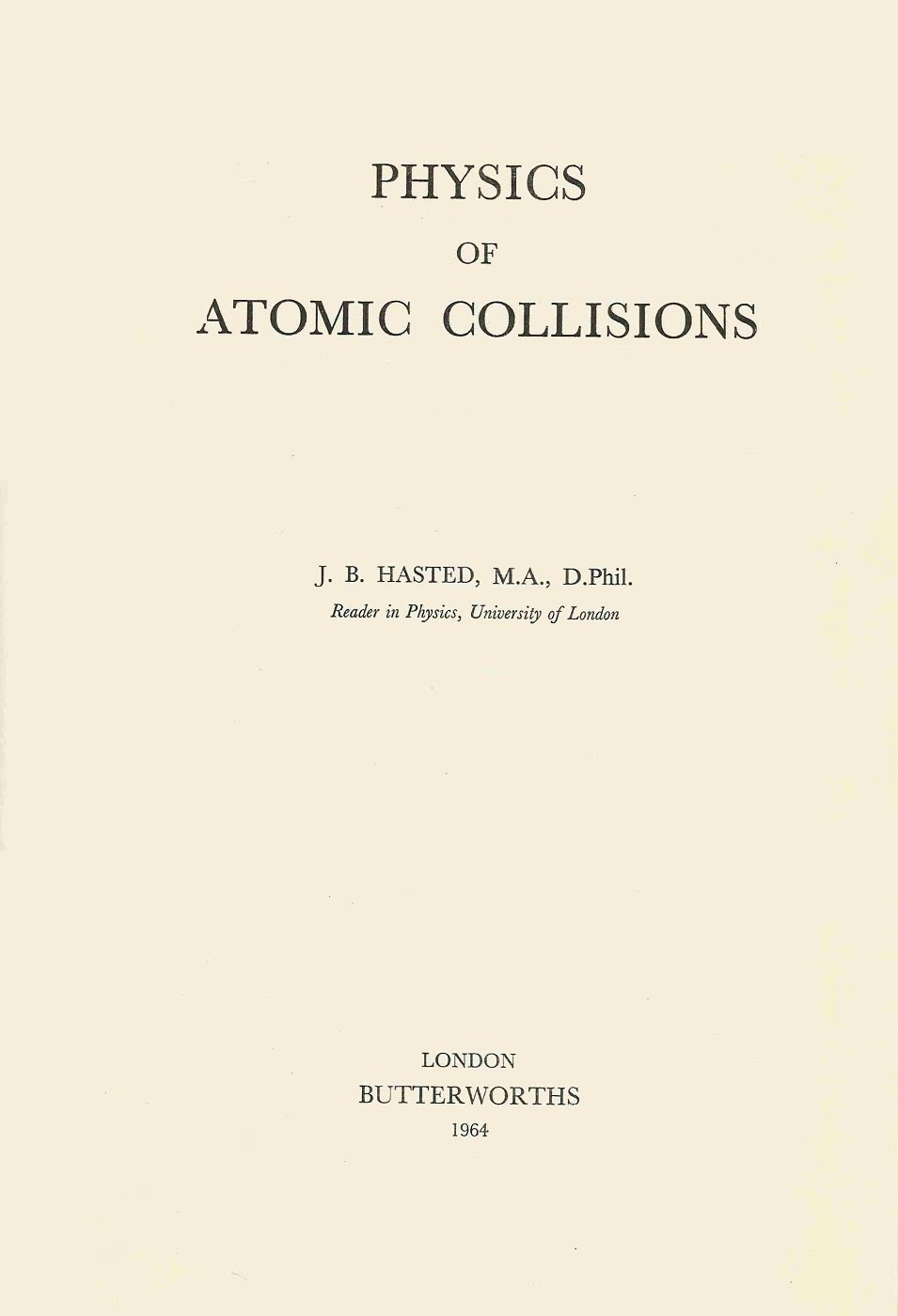
Physics of Atomic Collisions by J.B.Hasted

- Physics Of Atomic Collisions (1964)
- Aqueous Dielectrics (1973)
- The Metal Benders (1981)
- Alternative Memoirs (1992)
