= Kenneth Lo =

Kenneth Lo may refer to:

- Kenneth Lo (businessman) (born 1938), Hong Kong businessman
- Kenneth Lo (writer) (1913–1995), British Chinese writer, television chef, and restaurateur
- Ken Lo (born 1957), Hong Kong actor, martial artist, and stuntman
- Kenneth Lo Tak-cheung (1922–2007), Hong Kong lawyer and politician

== See also ==
- Kenneth Low, Chinese-Fijian businessman and political leader in Fiji
