= International Journal of Bilingualism =

- Discipline: Linguistics
- Language: English
- Edited by: Li Wei

Publication details
- History: 1997–present
- Publisher: SAGE Publications
- Frequency: Quarterly
- Impact factor: 0.974 (2016)

Standard abbreviations
- ISO 4: Int. J. Biling.

Indexing
- CODEN: IJBIFH
- ISSN: 1367-0069 (print); 1756-6878 (web)
- LCCN: 98053550
- OCLC no.: 614170119

Links
- Journal homepage; Online access; Online archive

The International Journal of Bilingualism is a peer-reviewed academic journal that publishes papers in the field of linguistics. The journal's editor is Li Wei (University College London). It has been in publication since 1997 and is currently published by SAGE Publications.

== Scope ==
IJB is an international forum for the dissemination of original research on the linguistic, psychological, neurological, and social issues which emerge from language contact, with a focus on the language behavior of bilingual and multilingual individuals.

== Abstracting and indexing ==
Journal title is abstracted and indexed in, among other databases: Arts & Humanities Citation Index, Current Contents, SCOPUS, and the Social Sciences Citation Index. According to the Journal Citation Reports, its 2016 impact factor is 0.974, ranking it 63rd out of 182 journals in the category "Linguistics".
