= Hylda Sims =

English folk musician and poet (1932–2020)

- Born: 3 April 1932; England
- Died: 13 January 2020 (aged 87)
- Occupations: Singer, poet, novelist

Hylda Sims (3 April 1932 – 13 January 2020) was an English folk musician and poet.

== Biography ==
She was born in 1932, to parents who travelled the country in a caravan selling homemade herbal remedies. Her father, Thomas Sims, was a member of the Plebs' League, and a founding member of the Communist Party of Great Britain. During the Second World War, Hilda attended Summerhill School in Suffolk, before leaving in her mid-teens and starting to live in Swiss Cottage, London. Her first guitar was a gift from Ivor Cutler. She joined the Young Communist League, and then the London Youth Choir set up by university lecturer John Hasted. She travelled with the choir to festivals in communist eastern Europe, and by the mid-1950s also sang and played guitar in coffee bars in central London, while working at Collet's book and record shop.

From 1954, she was in a personal relationship with modernist painter Russell Quaye. Together with John Pilgrim and John Lapthorne, they formed the City Ramblers (later the City Ramblers Skiffle Group), playing a mixture of jazz, blues, music hall and folk songs, and in 1955 set up the weekly Studio Skiffle club in Holborn. During the British skiffle boom of the mid to late 1950s, and later, Sims toured widely as a member of the City Ramblers, and recorded for the Storyville and Topic labels.

In the 1960s, she studied at Hull University. She later taught English as a foreign language in London and Spain, and established Lifespan, a residential community at Dunford Bridge on the South Yorkshire moors. She received a B.A. and an MSc in Russian Studies, and published three novels and two collections of poetry, Sayling the Babel (2006) and Reaching Peckham (2009). She regularly read her verse at poetry events, and performed with the City Ramblers Revival.

Sims died in January 2020 at the age of 87.
