= International Journal of Bilingual Education and Bilingualism =

Journal

- Discipline: Linguistics
- Language: English
- Edited by: Li Wei

Publication details
- History: 1998–present
- Publisher: Routledge
- ISO 4: Find out here

Indexing
- ISSN: 1367-0050 (print); 1747-7522 (web)

Links
- Journal homepage

The International Journal of Bilingual Education and Bilingualism is a peer-reviewed multidisciplinary academic journal that publishes papers in the field of linguistics, focusing on bilingualism and bilingual education. It has been in publication since 1997 and is currently published by Routledge. The journal's editor is Li Wei, PhD (University College London).

== Abstracting and indexing ==
This academic journal is abstracted and indexed in, among other databases:

- Arts & Humanities Citation Index
- SCOPUS
