= Li Wei (linguist) =

British linguist of Manchu-Chinese parentage

Li Wei (Chinese: 李嵬; pinyin: Lǐ Wéi) is a British linguist, journal editor, educator, and university leader, of Manchu-Chinese heritage, who is currently the executive dean of the UCL Institute of Education, University College London. He is an elected fellow of the British Academy, member of Academia Europaea, fellow of the Academy of Social Sciences (United Kingdom), and fellow of the Royal Society of Arts (RSA). Prior to his appointment as IOE's director and dean in March 2021, he was the chair of Applied Linguistics, director of the Centre for Applied Linguistics at the UCL Institute of Education, and director of the ESRC UCL, Bloomsbury (Birkbeck, SOAS, LSHTM) and East London Doctoral Training Partnership. Until the end of 2014, he was pro vice chancellor (then called pro-vice-master) for Research and Postgraduate Studies of Birkbeck College, University of London, where he was also chair of Applied Linguistics and director of the Birkbeck Graduate Research School.

His research interests are in contact linguistics, bilingualism and multilingualism, language learning, and language education. He founded a number of journals in linguistics and education.

== Biography ==
Li Wei was born in Beijing, China, of Manchu-Chinese parents and was initially trained as an English language teacher at the end of Mao's Cultural Revolution. He worked as an English teacher for two and a half years before studying for a BA in English language and literature at Beijing Normal University. He went to Newcastle University to teach Chinese in 1986. He has an MA (with Distinction) in English Language Studies and a PhD in Speech Sciences from Newcastle. His PhD supervisor was the sociolinguist Lesley Milroy, with whom he worked on a number of research projects.

He became professor of Applied Linguistics at Newcastle University in 1998, and was director of the Centre for Research in Linguistics between 1999 and 2002 and founding head of the School of Education, Communication and Language Sciences between 2002 and the end of 2006. He joined Birkbeck, University of London in January 2007 as chair of Applied Linguistics. In January 2015, he took up the chair of Applied Linguistics at University College London's Institute of Education.

== Publications ==
Amongst Li Wei's most recent publications are The Handbook of Translanguaging (Wiley-Blackwell 2026, with Ofelia Garcia, Prem Phyak and Jerry Won Lee), Translanguaging: Language, Bilingualism and Education (with Ofelia Garcia, Palgrave Macmillan, 2014) which won the 2015 BAAL Book Prize, Cambridge Handbook of Linguistic Multi-competence (2015, with Vivian Cook) which was runner up for the 2016 BAAL Book Prize, The Routledge Handbooks of Applied Linguistics (with Zhu Hua and James Simpson, two volumes), and The Blackwell Guide to Research Methods in Bilingualism and Multilingualism which won the 2009 British Association for Applied Linguistics Book Prize. He is editor-in-chief of the International Journal of Bilingual Education and Bilingualism (Taylor & Francis), and Applied Linguistics Review (De Gruyter). He founded several other leading journals in linguistics and education, including the International Journal of Bilingualism (Sage), Global Chinese (De Gruyter), Chinese Language and Discourse, Language, Culture and Society (Benjamins), Educational Linguistics (De Gruyter), and Research Methods in Applied Linguistics (Elsevier). He is editor of the Wiley-Blackwell book series Research Methods in Language & Linguistics, Cambridge Elements in Applied Linguistics (with Zhu Hua), and Bloomsbury Studies in Linguistics.

== Personal life ==
Li is his surname, but he follows Eastern name order and is known as Li Wei in his professional work and research publications.

He is married to the linguist and intercultural communication scholar and educator Professor Zhu Hua, with whom he has two sons.

In his "Who's Who" entry, he lists travel, music, non-fiction, and food and drink as his recreations.
