= Anhua Gao =

Chinese-born British author

- Born: 1949 (age 76–77); Nanjing, China
- Occupation: Writer
- Writing career
- Genres: Autobiography, fiction

Anhua "Ann" Gao (born 1949) is a Chinese-born British author of To The Edge of the Sky, published 2000, a best-selling autobiographical account of her and her family's life in Maoist China from 1926 until her escape to the West in 1994.

Anhua Gao was born in 1949 in Nanjing, Jiangsu Province, China. Gao's parents were both veteran Communists, and People's Liberation Army (PLA) high officials. Both parents died when Gao was a small child, of a combination of the effects of malnutrition and very poor medical care. After their deaths, they were hailed as revolutionary martyrs by the Maoist government, a title which protected Gao and her siblings from the worst excesses of the Cultural Revolution but did not spare Gao extreme hardship, persecution and even torture.

As a child, Gao was a diligent student, and her parents' influence as well as her hard study helped her become a Young Pioneer and a Red Guard. As a teenager during the Cultural Revolution, Gao joined the PLA to avoid being sent to the countryside for reform through hard labor, the fate of millions of other young Chinese men and women. She excelled in the army until she was denounced by her sister as a "bourgeois decadent" and dismissed. Gao was sent to work in an electronics factory, where she contracted Ménière's disease. She was the victim of domestic abuse from her husband, and then imprisoned and persecuted at the hands of the Chinese security police. In 1994, Gao moved to England to be with her British husband, whom she met via a written correspondence following an advertisement placed in the UK's Saga magazine.

In 2000, as a British citizen, Gao published her memoir of her life's experiences under Mao's regime, To The Edge Of The Sky, stating that she "wanted the world to know the truth about China" (dustjacket).

Gao currently lives and works in the UK.
