= Joost Smiers =

Dutch political scientist

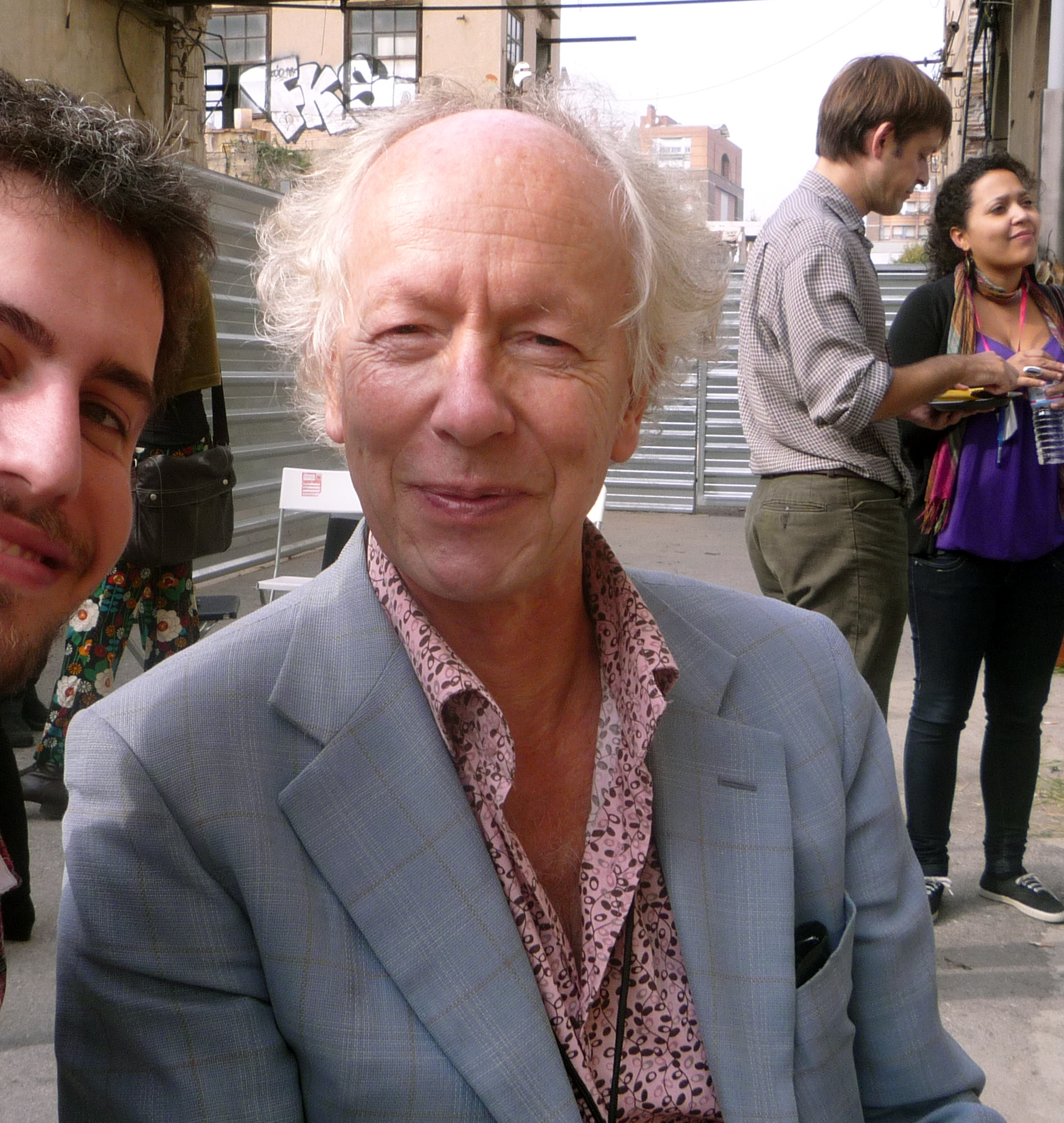
Joost Smiers, 2009

Joost Smiers (born 1943, Amsterdam) is a Dutch political scientist, best known as an opponent of copyright.

Smiers received his Ph.D.in Political Science in 1977 from the University of Amsterdam. He is currently Professor Emeritus of Political Science of the Arts and a Research Fellow in the Research Group Arts & Economics at the Utrecht School of the Arts, where he served as Professor from 1985 until his retirement in 2007.

== Publications ==
- 1977. Cultuur in Nederland 1945-1955: Meningen en beleid. Amsterdam, PhD thesis, University of Amsterdam, Nijmegen.
- 1995. Artists and the infrastructure for their work, Council of Europe. Contribution to the World commission on Culture and Development. (with Suzanne Capiau).
- 1999. Kunst en kunstonderwijs in lokaal en mondiaal perspectief. Utrecht, Utrecht School of the Arts. (with Marieke van Schijndel).
- 2000. Tout ce qui est fragile exige une protection. Une collaboration entre les mouvements culturel et ecologiques. Paris, Institut Néerlandais.
- 2003. Arts under Pressure: Promoting Cultural Diversity in the Age of Globalisation. London: Zed Books. ISBN 1 84277 262 7/ 263 5.
- 2004. Artistic Expression in a Corporate World: Do We Need Monopolistic Control? Utrecht: Utrecht School of the Arts.
- 2006. Un mundo sin copyright: Artes y medios en la globalización. Barcelona, Gedisa, ISSN/ISBN 84-9784-052-6
- 2006. (editor). UNESCO's Convention on the Protection and the Promotion of the Diversity of Cultural Expressions: Making it Work. Zagreb: CultureLink. (with Nina Obuljen).ISBN 953-6096-40-4.
- 2009. Adieu auteursrecht, vaarwel culturele conglomeraten (en), Boom Uitgevers, The Hague, ISBN 978-90-8974-110-3 (with Marieke van Schijndel).
