= Sue Cheung =

Award-winning novelist

- Born: Cheung Ying Yee; Nottingham, England
- Other names: Sue Pickford
- Occupation: novelist
- Years active: 2013-present
- Notable work: Chinglish

Sue Cheung (born Cheung Ying Yee), formerly known as Sue Pickford, is a novelist. She is best known for her first novel Chinglish.

== Biography ==
Cheung was born in Nottingham, England, to parents who had emigrated from Hong Kong in the 1960s. They ran a Chinese restaurant in Nottingham, and when she was nine started running a butchers shop in Hull. They then moved to Coventry, where the family lived in a Chinese takeaway for most of her teen years. Despite her parents coming from Hong Kong, she has never been there, in part due to her parents’ working schedule.

At the age of 16, she won a scholarship at the London College of Fashion to study to become an artist. She subsequently worked in advertising as an Art Director before switching to freelance design.

Her first novel for teenagers, Chinglish, is based on her experiences growing up in the takeaway in Coventry. It won several prizes, including being featured the 2019 Guardian’s Best Books list, winning the ‘Simply the Book’ category at the Coventry Inspiration Book Awards, and winning the Young Adult category the Diverse Book Awards.

== Works ==
=== Novel ===
- Cheung, Sue (2019). Chinglish. London: Anderson Press. ISBN 9781783448395

=== Picture books ===
- Pickford, Sue (2019). Chill with Lil. Sherborne: Ragged Bears Publishing Limited. ISBN 9781857144710
- Pickford, Sue (2015). When Angus Met Alvin. London: Frances Lincoln Children's Books. ISBN 9781847805249
- Pickford, Sue (2015). Far from Home. North brook, IL: Pearson Scott Foresman. ISBN 9780328832736
- Pickford, Sue (2014). Bob and Rob. London: Frances Lincoln Children's Books. ISBN 9781847803436
