= Woon Wing Yip =

British businessman (1937–2025)

Woon Wing Yip OBE
- Born: December 1937; British Hong Kong
- Died: 21 September 2025 (aged 88)
- Occupation: Businessman
- Known for: Wing Yip supermarket chain

Chinese name
- Traditional Chinese: 葉煥榮
- Simplified Chinese: 叶焕荣
Transcriptions
Standard Mandarin
- Hanyu Pinyin: Yè Huànróng
- Wade–Giles: Yeh^{4} Huan^{4}-jung^{2}
- IPA: [jě xwânɻʊ̌ŋ]
Yue: Cantonese
- Jyutping: Jip^{6} Wun^{6} Wing^{4}

Woon Wing Yip OBE (December 1937 – 21 September 2025) was a Hong Kong-born British businessman, best known for having started the Wing Yip supermarket chain.

== Early life ==
A Hakka born in December 1937 in British Hong Kong, Yip arrived in Hull, England from Hong Kong in 1959 with £2. He then worked and later started his own restaurants in the East Anglia region of England, in towns such as Clacton and Ipswich.

== Wing-Yip ==
Yip had the ability to speak English and knew that the food wholesale business is more profitable than running a Chinese takeaway. Therefore, in 1969, he founded the Wing Yip supermarket in Birmingham. The Wing Yip business has since branched out into property development, management and investment, with more than 60 commercial and residential tenants around the country. The property portfolio is now worth around £23 million. With an annual turnover of £80 million, he became the first Anglo-Chinese tycoon in United Kingdom.

== Other achievements ==
Yip was also a philanthropist who had among other acts of generosity, endowed several bursaries and scholarships for university students from both the UK and China, administered through the W Wing Yip and Brothers Charitable Trust. In 2008 Yip was awarded an Honorary Doctorate from Birmingham City University. He was appointed Officer of the Order of the British Empire (OBE) in the 2010 New Year Honours.

Yip died on 21 September 2026, at the age of 88.
