= Wing Yip =

Chinese supermarket chain in the United Kingdom

Wing Yip Group

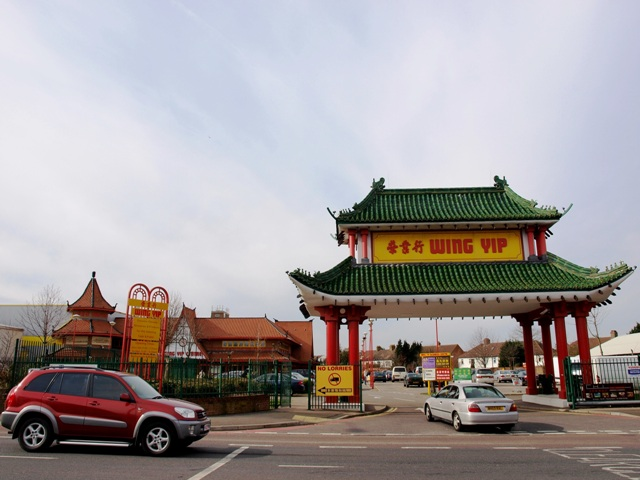
- Entrance to the Croydon superstore
- Type: Private company
- Industry: Wholesale, export and real estate
- Founded: Birmingham, England (1970)
- Headquarters: Birmingham, England
- Key people: Woon Wing Yip (Chairman)
- Products: Chinese groceries
- Revenue: ▼£90.3 million (2024)
- Net income: ▲£3.5 million (2024)
- Total assets: ▲£23.6 million (2024)
- Number of employees: 300+
- Subsidiaries: W Wing Yip & Brothers Trading Group Ltd. W Wing Yip & Brothers Property and Investments Ltd.

Chinese name
- Traditional Chinese: 榮業行
- Simplified Chinese: 荣业行
Transcriptions
Standard Mandarin
- Hanyu Pinyin: róng yè háng
Yue: Cantonese
- Yale Romanization: wìhng yihp hòhng
- Website: wingyip.com

Wing Yip is a Chinese supermarket chain founded by Woon Wing Yip in England in 1970. It is the largest Chinese supermarket chain in the United Kingdom.

Its original store in Birmingham also serves as its headquarters and national distribution centre. The company has superstore branches in Manchester, Croydon and Cricklewood. The company now has a smaller stores called WingYip DiDi the company's first location will be in Watford

In addition, the company has expanded into wholesale and export (international trade), real estate development, and management by situating its stores within larger commercial centres. Its tofu-based meat substitutes have been popular due to vegan diets since the 2010s.

== History ==
The founder, Woon Wing Yip, was a Hakka born in Dongguan County, Guangdong, China, in 1937. He arrived in the United Kingdom from Hong Kong in 1959 by boat with £2. He later opened a restaurant in a former tea shop in Clacton-on-Sea, followed by three restaurants and two takeaways in the East Anglia region. In 1968, he was joined by his brother, Sammy Yap. In 1970, Wing Yip and Sammy opened their first specialist Chinese grocery in Digbeth, Birmingham. The store's inventory included produce from Hong Kong, Malaysia, Thailand and Singapore with the Hong Kong Association writing that it included more than 1,000 genuine Chinese products to shoppers including Chinese restaurants and takeaways.

In 1977, Lee Sing Yap joined his brothers Wing Yip and Sammy. They opened a Manchester store on Faulkner Street, and a second Manchester store opened on Addington Street in 1978. In 1996, the Birmingham site grew to 7 acres (2.8 ha) with the purchase and development of further land, including a public road. In 1998, Wing Yip and his brothers donated a 40-foot (12 m) granite pagoda to the City of Birmingham in gratitude to the city for providing a home to them.

Wing Yip's online shopping site was launched in 2004; it includes recipes, cooking and dining information. It primarily served UK consumers.

In 2005, Wing Yip was exhibited at the International Food Exhibition in London. The company announced an "ambitious" expansion in 2006 that would see it expand into smaller cities while opening a depot in Cardiff (in addition to its existing four) as part of its efforts to build a national rather than regional presence. By September 2006, a sixth outlet in Nottingham was planned.

In July 2014, the company said that 15 of its online customers had used its newly-launched click and collect scheme as their choice for delivery. In August, the company introduced Sunday deliveries for the first time. By 2017, the company was the biggest "Oriental" wholesaler in the United Kingdom, also supplying supermarkets like Tesco.

By 2019, Wing Yip had four stores and turnover of £110 million. The same year, it renovated its Birmingham retail centre, adding additional office and retail sites with renovations planned for stores in Manchester. In 2020, the company completed a £16 million expansion of its second London store in Croydon, doubling floor space and providing 60,000 square feet of warehouse space. The expansion had been in progress since 2012 when Wing Yip had purchased adjacent land in preparation for the expansion, initiated in 2016, to double the facilities. In 2022, the company reported that pre-tax profits had risen to £11 million in the year prior. In 2022, following a public consultation of two weeks, the Birmingham City Council approved an expansion of its headquarters and original store by 2,838 square meters for additional storage and office space including a large cold storage facility.

The Wing Yip Group operates from four freehold sites covering 16.3 acres (6.6 ha) and employs around 300 staff.

In the financial year ending 30 September 2024, the company reported turnover of £90.33 million with £3.54 million profit before tax, and assets of £23.62 million.

== Branches ==
- Birmingham (headquarters and national distribution center)
- Manchester
- Cricklewood
- Croydon
- Watford

== Awards ==
- 2006 – Wing Yip was the Winner of The Lord Chan Award for Outstanding Individual.
- April 2008 – Wing Yip (Manchester) Ltd. achieved North West Business of the Year in the Ethnic Minority Business Forum Awards.
- June 2005 – Tony Ritson, Information Technology Manager for Wing Yip, wins Best Information Security Manager 2005 from SC Magazine.
- September 2008 – Birmingham City University presented Wing Yip with an honorary doctorate.
- October 2008 – The Mai Siam range achieved Gold Stars at the Great Taste Awards.
- 2008 – Wing Yip was awarded an Honorary Doctorate from Birmingham City University.
- 2010 – Wing Yip was awarded the Lifetime Achievement.
- 2012 – Wing Yip was awarded an Honorary Degree from Aston University.

== See also ==
- Asian supermarket
- Oseyo
- H Mart
