= Battle of Britain House =

- View of the house from the garden

- Location within Greater London

General information
- Location: Ruislip, Greater London, England
- Coordinates: 51.594158°N 0.437222°W
- Completed: 1905
- Demolished: 1984
- Client: Josef Conn

Battle of Britain House, also known over time as Franklin House and Kokyo, was a private mansion in Ruislip. It was used by the United States military to train agents for undercover missions in occupied France during the Second World War. After the war, the house was dedicated as a memorial to the Royal Air Force squadrons involved in the Battle of Britain. It also became a residential college and headquarters to the Ruislip & District Natural History Society. The house was destroyed by fire in 1984 and demolished; in 1993 the site was cleared to allow it to be reclaimed by nature.

== History ==
The house was built by Josef Conn in 1905, after he had received a lease from King's College, Cambridge, the owners of much of the land in Ruislip, to build within Copse Wood. At the time of building, it was possible to view the reservoir of what would become Ruislip Lido, and the church of Harrow on the Hill, St. Mary's.

Meyer Franklin Kline, an American shipping magnate, took over the lease from Conn in 1920. He first renamed the house "Kokyo" to reflect his company's presence in Asia, followed by "Franklin House", after President Franklin D. Roosevelt. During his ownership, Kline had various ornaments from the Far East placed around the gardens, and had furniture built for the house using wood taken from the luxury cabins of his ships.

Upon the outbreak of the Second World War in 1939, Kline was in America and leased the house to a German national. The unnamed German was forced to relinquish his ownership due to regulations brought in by the British government. It was provided to the United States military to enable agents of the Clandestine Operations Division to be trained before embarking on sabotage missions in occupied France, its location within Copse Wood making it ideal for this purpose.

The house was planned to be purchased as part of a war memorial scheme in which young people from Britain and the Empire would take part in exchange visits. Due to financial problems, the scheme could not buy the house, and it was instead purchased from King's College in 1948 by Middlesex County Council to become a welfare centre for young people. The house was renamed the Battle of Britain House, as had been part of the original plan, and featured plaques in the dining room with the badges of each Royal Air Force squadron active in the battle. It was officially opened on 1 March 1949 by Air Chief Marshal Sir James Robb.

The house continued as a residential college run by Victor Stanyon and from 1951 housed the headquarters of the Ruislip & District Natural History Society. It was destroyed by fire in 1984 and the ruins were demolished. Following a number of attempts to sell the site for development, it was agreed in 1993 to allow the ground to be returned to nature.
