= Chris Liu =

Chinese-born London-based fashion designer

- Born: Urumqi
- Education: London College of Fashion
- Label: CHRIS LIU

Chris Liu (simplified Chinese: 刘桓; traditional Chinese: 劉桓; pinyin: Líu Huán;) is a Chinese-born and London-based fashion designer. Born in the cosmopolitan city of Urumqi in northwest China.

== Career ==
Liu graduated as master of art in fashion design and technology with distinction at London College of Fashion in 2003.

In the early nineties Liu studied at Auckland University of Technology in New Zealand and worked as a designer with knitwear brand Sabatini for four years. In 2001 he moved to London for a placement at Burberry Prorsum followed by a design consultancy with Christopher Bailey.

In 2003, as part of London Development Agency's funding, Liu set up his womenswear line Huan by Chris Liu. His debut catwalk show was in London City Hall in August 2003. The collection has been sold immediately to prestigious shops like Harvey Nichols, Joseph in London and Maria Luisa in Paris. Liu's celebrity clients include Maggie Cheung, Angelica Cheung, Shu Qi, Michelle Yeoh, Kylie Minogue, Sade, Jamellia and Sophia Myles. In 2005 he left Huan by Chris Liu label, he continues his own womenswear label as CHRIS LIU.

In November 2005 Liu was commissioned by the Chinese Embassy and Lord Chamberlain's Office to present an exclusive show at the London College of Fashion in the presence of the Chinese First Lady, Madame Liu during the State Visit by Chinese President Hu Jin Tao.

Liu is a visiting tutor at the London College of Fashion. Recently been described as "raising star" and "the luxury brand in the making" by the international fashion industry. In 2006 Liu designed for Rodnik SS 2007 Collection.

In 2008 September Hywel Davies fashion journalist published his book: 100 New Fashion Designers. The book which features Chris Liu, is the ultimate reference guide to the world's movers and shakers in fashion today.

In March 2009, Liu was shortlisted for the 2009 Big Ben Award - Ten Outstanding Chinese Young Persons Selection in the UK alongside Alexa Chung and Gok Wan. In September 2009, Liu was selected as a finalist for the British Business Awards 2009 in the Alumnus category.

Chris Liu has been selected for the 250th edition of i-D Magazine, as one of 250 people around the world who might influence future contemporary culture

In July 2011, Liu won 2010 Big Ben Award for UK's Top Ten Outstanding Chinese Award.
