= Bill Poon =

Chinese-British chef and restaurateur (1944–2026)

- 潘偉廉
- Born: Poon Wai Lim; 3 December 1944; Shunde, Guangdong, China
- Died: 16 June 2026 (aged 81)
- Years active: 1967–2003
- Spouse: Cecilia Lam
- Children: 2
- Culinary career
- Cooking style: Cantonese

William Wai Lim Poon (3 December 1944 – 16 June 2026) was a Chinese-British chef and restaurateur. A seventh-generation master chef, he moved to England in 1967 and opened the first Poon's restaurant in 1973 on Lisle Street in London's Chinatown. Seven Poon's restaurants were eventually opened, the best known one on King Street in Covent Garden, which received a Michelin Star.

== Early life ==
Poon was born in Shunde, Guangdong, the fifth of seven children. He was of the seventh generation in a family of chefs. One of his ancestors was once summoned to the Imperial Court in Peking to work with chefs from other regions; another worked for an itinerant provincial governor and invented a form of the stock cube by soaking cloths in highly concentrated stock and drying them so that they could be easily transported. The family developed recipes for wind-dried sausages and wind-dried duck that Poon later used in his restaurants. When the Communists took over in 1949, the family moved to Portuguese Macao, where his parents started a successful restaurant. He began working in the kitchen of the restaurant when he was 14. He later worked in British Hong Kong training with a Swiss pâtissière where he met his future wife Cecilia Lam who was wary of marrying into his large family. When she moved to England, Poon followed suit in 1967. They married the following year.

== Career ==
In Britain, Poon worked as a dim sum chef in Birmingham, before he opened a take-away in London. In 1968, he obtained a catering contract supplying meals for students staying at Hong Kong House (Hong Kong Student Centre). In 1969, he worked as a pastry chef at Hugh Hefner's Playboy Club, and he started a business producing wind-dried meat and sausages. He also ran a fish-and-chip shop in Shepherd's Bush.

=== Poon's restaurant ===
In 1973, Poon was joined by his parents in London, and opened the Poon's restaurant on Lisle Street. Poon's became acclaimed for its authentic Cantonese menu and was known for its Chinese wind-dry sausages and duck made to an old family recipe. It was also credited with introducing Claypot rice to the UK.

Regular customers of Poon's Lord Tanlaw and his wife suggested that Poon moved to a larger premise, and in 1976, Bill and Cecilia Poon opened the Poon's of Covent Garden at 41 King Street on the corner of Covent Garden Piazza with Lord and Lady Tanlaw as partners. Unusual at that time, the kitchen was placed in the middle of the restaurant enclosed with glass partitions so that the customers could see the chef at work. Poon's became noted for changing the perception of Chinese restaurants in the UK which at that time produced meals that were Anglo-Chinese hybrid adapted for British taste. In 1980, Poon's of Covent Garden was awarded a Michelin Star. Amongst its clientele were Mick Jagger, Frank Sinatra, and Barbra Streisand.

In 1985 Bill and Cecilia opened Poon's of Geneva and Poon's in The City followed in 1992. Bill's sister took over the Lisle Street business and Bill's brother was responsible for Poon's in Leicester Street (off Lisle Street), Russell Square and Whiteleys in Bayswater. At its peak, there were seven Poon's restaurants.

Bill and Cecilia Poon retired from the restaurant scene in 2003. All the Poon's restaurants closed, with the original one on Lisle Street closing in 2004.

In February 2018, Bill Poon's daughter, Amy, resurrected the family business in the form of a three-month pop-up in Clerkenwell, and developed the Poon's Wontoneria concept in 2019 including a residency at Carousel on Charlotte Street in 2023. This was followed by a permanent location at Somerset House in Central London in November 2025.

== Community engagement ==
An active member of the Chinese community in London and well-respected in the industry, Bill sat on the judging panel of Chinese Masterchef (organised by Westminster City Council) and was nominated in 2006 in the Pearl Awards for the Promotion of Excellence in Chinese Cuisine. Poon worked in support of community projects and was the chair of the Euro-Chinese Literature Association (歐華文聯), and the Permanent President of Shunde UK Association.

At Poon's, ingredients that were not used on the day were cooked and given to the homeless at Waterloo Bridge.

== Death ==
Poon died from cancer on 16 June 2026, aged 81.
