= Zion Tse =

Biomedical engineer

Zion Tse is a British engineer and professor. His work focuses on digital health, surgical robotics, and AI medical imaging, and he has developed medical technologies that have been applied in clinical trials. He is an Academy of Medical Sciences Professor, a Fellow of both the Institution of Mechanical Engineers and the Institution of Engineering and Technology

== Research and career ==
Most of Tse's academic and professional experience has been in digital health, surgical robotics, and AI medical imaging. His research bridges Engineering and Medicine, connecting multidisciplinary teams of medical doctors, researchers and engineers. Tse has published internationally circulated journal papers, articles at international conferences, and robotic and mechatronic patents.
