= Ronald Tress =

British economist

Ronald C Tress, CBE, (11 January 1915 – 28 September 2006) was a British economist.

He studied Economics 1933–36 at University College, Southampton taking a University of London external degree.

Beginning in 1941 he was an economic adviser to the British War Cabinet for four years. He became a professor of Political Economy at the University of Bristol in 1951. He was Master of Birkbeck College, University of London from 1968 to 1977. He was elected a Fellow of Birkbeck College, University of London in 1977. He became director of the Leverhulme Trust of 1978.
