= Murder of Mi Gao Huang Chen =

2005 murder in the United Kingdom

Mi Gao Huang Chen
- Chinese: 陈高皇
Transcriptions
Standard Mandarin
- Hanyu Pinyin: Chén Gāohuáng

On 23 April 2005, Mi Gao Huang Chen (1964 – 28 April 2005), a British Chinese restaurant owner, was attacked by a large group of youths outside the Chinese takeaway he ran in Scholes, Wigan, Greater Manchester. He died of his injuries on 28 April at the age of 41. The police arrested 23 people in connection with the attack, four of whom were eventually convicted of murder.

== Background ==
Born in China, Chen moved to the UK several years before his death, where he became known as Michael Chen. Using a less common phonetic spelling of Michael, Mi Gao (米高), he compounded it with his first name, Gaohuang, to form Mi Gao Huang, despite some English sources falsely reporting Huang Chen as being his surname. In 2004 he and his girlfriend, Jia Ming Yan, also known as Eileen Jia, bought the Superb Hut takeaway after the previous owner had abandoned it because of the harassment they suffered. In the months before the attack, the couple reported several incidents of antisocial behaviour to the police, including racial abuse and an incident a day before Chen's death on 22 April, where a group of youths smashed a window; Jia later said the police response to these incidents was lacking.

== Murder ==
On the night of the attack, Chen, Jia, and their chef, surnamed Wah, wielding various tools and bottles as melee weapons, confronted a group of youths who had gathered outside the takeaway, chasing them onto a nearby housing estate. As the trio turned to leave, Chen was attacked by the youths, who had returned armed with make-shift weapons of their own, which included wooden clubs, metal pipes, a garden hoe and a spade. Chen was kicked to the floor from behind and pummelled by one of the youths as the others looked on, with several of them soon joining in while others prevented Jia and Wah from intervening. During the attack—which lasted 15 minutes, was captured on camera, and was described by the prosecution as "forceful, deliberate and plain to see"—Chen was punched, kicked, had his head stamped on, and was bludgeoned with the weapons. One of the teenagers was overheard repeatedly saying "I'll fucking kill you" while attacking with a wooden board. The coverage shows a girl throwing a branch at Jia, and Jia's attempts to protect Chen. Chen fell into a coma, and was taken to Hope Hospital (now Salford Royal), where he died on 28 April. The pathologist who examined the body found that it had a fractured skull, a broken jaw, and a partly crushed brain; and said the cause of death was blunt-force trauma to the head.

== Aftermath ==
Police arrested six teenagers for the crime: Anthony Dunleavy, 17, Joe Sankey, 16, Jason Hughes, 16, Jamie Stephens, 16, an unnamed 16 year old boy and a 15 year old girl. The death contributed to the development of a number of schemes and groups designed to address crime in the local area. Hughes, who was identified as the ringleader, claimed that the group had come to the shop that night to "have revenge" for a previous incident in which the 15 year old girl was struck in the head by the takeaway workers during an argument. Hsiao-Hung of The Guardian said the attack was part of a trend of increasing anti-Chinese violence in the country. Jia and some in the Chinese community saw the attack as racially motivated, saying that the youths were white. Bobby Chan, chairperson of Min Quan, and Suresh Grover, director of The Monitoring Group, said the police had a tendency to fail to support Chinese victims such as Jia: "it seemed that most criminal justice agencies froze when it came applying the most basic of the Lawrence Inquiry recommendations to Chinese victims". Detective chief inspector Steve Crimins of Greater Manchester Police said the attack was not racially motivated, and that "[t]o say that any failure to deal with previous incidents led directly to the death of Mr Chen is ludicrous". The Institute of Race Relations considers the death to have a "(known or suspected) racial element".

The unnamed 16 year old boy was eventually cleared of murder by a jury while the 15 year old was acquitted of murder after the jury failed to reach a verdict; she instead pleaded guilty to a lesser charge of violent disorder. The remaining youths were sentenced to mandatory life sentences for murder. In May 2011 Sankey had his tariff reduced from nine years and eight months to eight years and six months on account of "exceptional and unforeseen progress".

== Sources ==
- ""Hidden from public view?" Racism against the UK Chinese population" (PDF). Archived (PDF) from the original on 4 October 2011. (521 KB). Monitoring Group and University of Hull. pp. 3–5. Accessed 18 August 2011. 20 August 2011.
