= Kenneth Lo (writer) =

Diplomat, food writer, restaurateur, retailer, and tennis player

- Born: Lo Hsiao Chien; 12 September 1913; Fuzhou, Fujian, China
- Died: 11 August 1995 (aged 81); London, England
- Education: Yenching University (BA); University of Cambridge (MA)
- Spouse: Anne Phillipe Browne (m. 1954)
- Children: 4
- Culinary career
- Current restaurant
- Memories of China

Kenneth Lo (born Lo Hsiao Chien; 12 September 1913 – 11 August 1995) was a Chinese diplomat, food writer, restaurateur, retailer and tennis player.

== Early life ==
Lo Hsiao Chien (Note: Chinese: 羅孝建; pinyin: Luō Xiàojiàn) was born on 12 September 1913 in Fuzhou (the capital of Fujian, China). His grandfather, Sir Lo Feng-Lu, had been Chinese Ambassador to Britain, while his father was the Chinese Consul General in London. As a child, the younger Lo was rechristened Kenneth, which had been a nickname a British physician had given him. In his youth, Lo excelled in tennis representing Peking University and becoming champion of North China. Later, he represented China at the 1936 Davis Cup. He graduated from Yenching University in Beijing with a B.A. in physics, and subsequently studied the English tripos at Fitzwilliam House, Cambridge, obtaining an M.A. from the University of Cambridge in 1938.

== Career ==
After graduating from Cambridge, Lo worked as an industrial relations officer at the Chinese consulate in Liverpool. He was promoted to vice-consul in Manchester in 1946, but left the diplomatic service after the Communist seizure of China in 1949. With a loan of $80, he opened a shop selling Chinese greeting cards and, as business improved, Chinese pottery too. By 1956, Lo's business had expanded to the point that he had his own art gallery in London.

Lo also began pursuing a career as a writer sometime between 1953 and 1955. He wrote more than thirty Chinese cookbooks. (Note: According to The Independent, Lo "wrote the first of 40 Chinese cookbooks in 1953". However, according to The New York Times, he "wrote his first book on Chinese cooking in 1955".) His first cookbook, Cooking the Chinese Way, was written in three weeks and sold 10,000 copies. His 1970s cookbook Chinese Food was similarly well-received, while New Chinese Vegetarian Cooking (1987) contained, according to one reviewer, "such tempting recipes as Sichuan hot-braised stir-fried eggplant and stir-fried asparagus with garlic." Lo also wrote reviews for Egon Ronay and The Good Food Guide.

In 1976, Lo founded the London-based Chinese Gourmet Club. In 1980, he cofounded Memories of China—a restaurant which offered a variety of Chinese dishes, including those from Lo's hometown in Fujian—together with his wife and several business partners; The Daily Telegraph announced that it "was instantly rated among the best Chinese restaurants in the country". The same year, Lo established the London-based culinary school, Ken Lo's Kitchen, which may have been the first Chinese cooking school in Europe. A second Memories of China branch was opened in 1989.

== Personal life and death ==
Lo died of cancer, aged 81, on 11 August 1995 in a London hospital. He was survived by his wife, Anne Phillipe Browne (c. 1929–2013), whom he had married in 1954, and their four children: Robert, Michael, Vivienne, and Jennifer. Nick Smurthwaite and Henry McNulty of The Independent described Lo as "the foremost expert in Britain on Chinese food" who "played a huge part in popularising and improving its consumption".
