= Zhu Hua =

Zhù Huá (祝华) is professor of Language Learning and Intercultural Communication at the UCL Institute of Education, University College London, director of the International Centre of Intercultural Studies, and chair of the British Association for Applied Linguistics. She was previously chair of Educational Linguistics in the School of Education at the University of Birmingham, and professor of Applied Linguistics and Communication at Birkbeck College, University of London, where she was also associate dean of the School of Social Sciences, History and Philosophy. She was a member of the Education subpanel of the 2021 UK Research Excellence Framework (REF), member of the 2020 Hong Kong Research Assessment Exercise, and chairs the grant assessment panel for Psychology and Linguistics for the Hong Kong Research Grants Council. She is fellow of the Academy of Social Sciences, UK, Academia Europaea Academia Europaea, and the International Academy for Intercultural Research.

== Life ==
Zhu was born in China and studied telecommunication and English in Beijing. She has an MA in Applied Linguistics from Beijing Normal University, and was the first doctoral student of the late Professor Qian Yuan (钱瑗), the daughter of the well known Chinese scholars and writers Qian Zhongshu (钱锺书) and Yang Jiang (杨绛). She later obtained her PhD in Speech Sciences from Newcastle University in Britain.

Her research spans cross-linguistic studies of child language acquisition, speech and language disorders of young children, pragmatics, multilingualism, and intercultural communication. She has also been involved in designing a number of clinical tests for speech and language development in English and Chinese.

== Publications ==
Zhu is the author of Phonological Development in Specific Context (2002), and editor of Phonological Development and Disorder (with Barbara Dodd, 2006), Language Teaching/Learning as Social Inter-Action (with Paul Seedhouse, Li Wei and Vivian Cook, 2007), and The Language and Intercultural Communication Reader (2011). She is one of the authors of the clinical assessment DEAP: Diagnostic Evaluation of Articulation and Phonology. She has been the reviews editor of The International Journal of Bilingualism (Sage), and is the forum and reviews editor of Applied Linguistics (OUP). She worked as Sir James Knott Post-Doctoral Research Fellow, lecturer and senior lecturer at Newcastle University, and reader at Birkbeck. She has held visiting and honorary professorships in a number of Australian and Chinese universities. She was elected fellow of the Academy of Social Sciences, UK, in 2019, and of Academia Europaea in 2025.
