= 1952 in architecture =

The year 1952 in architecture involved some significant events. In this post-World War Two year, a number of significant buildings were built or re-built, primarily in the Modernist or Brutalist styles in vogue that year.

== Buildings and structures ==
=== Buildings ===
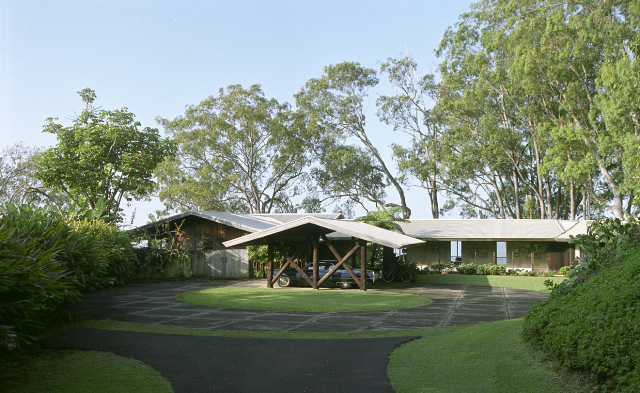
Liljestrand House in Honolulu, Hawaii

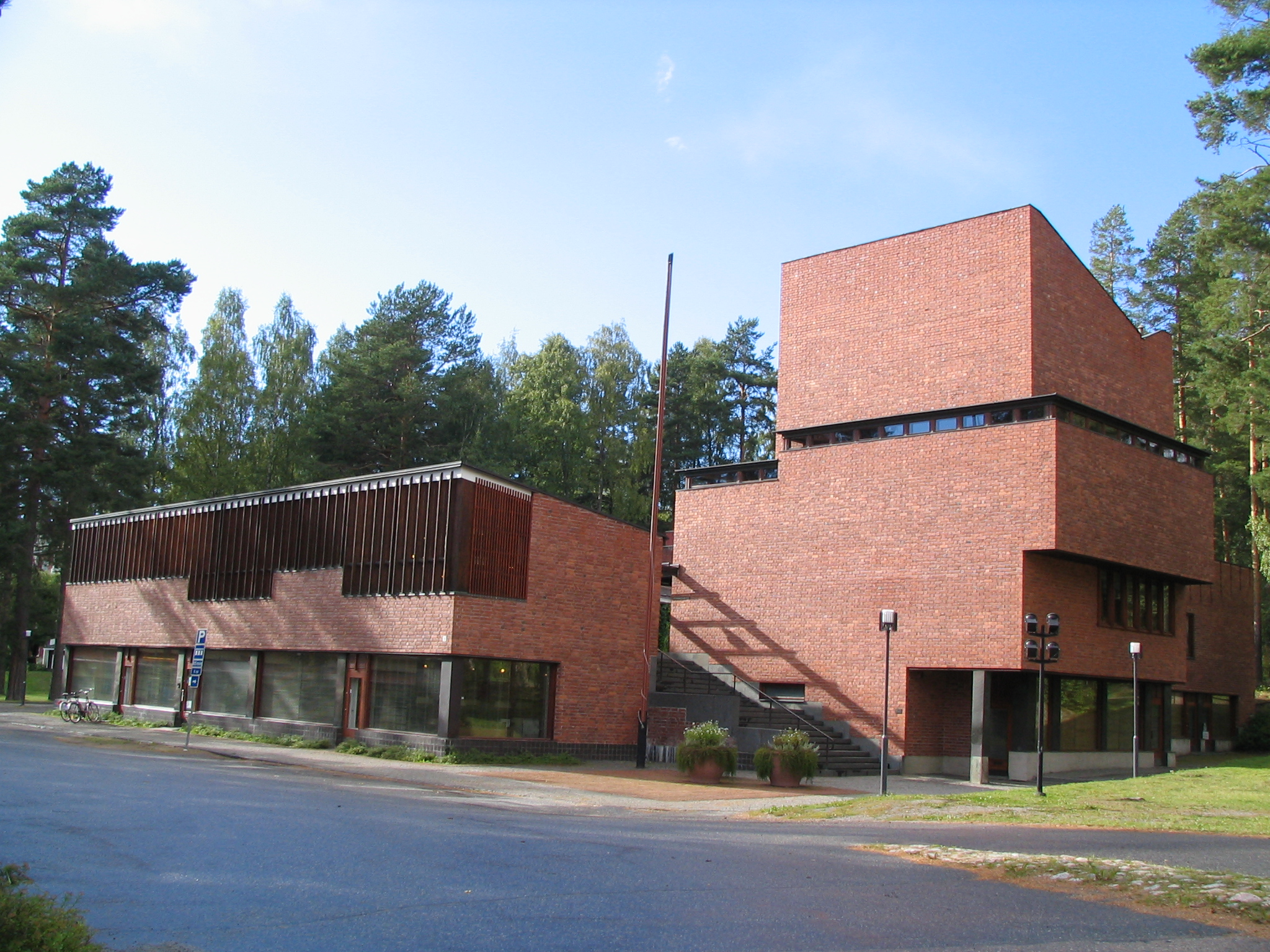
Säynätsalo Town Hall in Finland

- April – Stockwell Garage, designed by Adie, Button and Partners, with engineer A. E. Beer, is opened by London Transport.
- December 15 – The Sands Hotel, designed by Wayne McAllister, is opened on the Las Vegas Strip (demolished 30 June 1996).
- Brewster-Douglass Housing Projects, completed in the Brush Park section of Detroit, Michigan.
- Edificio Miguel E. Abed completed in Mexico City using the latest technology for earthquake engineering.
- Kotelnicheskaya Embankment apartments completed in the central Tagansky District in Moscow, and one of the "Seven Sisters".
- Lever House, designed by Gordon Bunshaft and Natalie de Blois of Skidmore, Owings and Merrill, is completed at 390 Park Avenue in New York City.
- Liljestrand House in Honolulu, Hawaii, designed by Vladimir Ossipoff, is completed.
- Utzon's House in Hellebæk (Denmark), designed by Jørn Utzon for himself, is built.
- Säynätsalo Town Hall in Finland, designed by Alvar Aalto, is completed.
- Unité d'Habitation in Marseille, designed by Le Corbusier, is completed.
- Pedregulho Housing Complex in Rio de Janeiro, designed by Affonso Eduardo Reidy, is inaugurated.
- United Nations Secretariat Building on Manhattan, designed by France's Le Corbusier and Brazil's Oscar Niemeyer, is completed.
- Dorton Arena ("Paraboleum"), Raleigh, North Carolina, designed by Matthew Nowicki (died 1950), is built.
- Campus building for Indiana University Bloomington design by Mies van der Rohe is finished, but construction is postponed and the building will be completed as the Mies Building for the Eskenazi School of Art, Architecture + Design in 2022.

== Awards ==
- AIA Gold Medal – Auguste Perret.
- RIBA Royal Gold Medal – George Grey Wornum.

== Births ==
- February 15 – Marco Piva, Italian
- July 25 – Eduardo Souto de Moura, Portuguese
- December 15 – David Marks, British (d. 2017)
- Shelley McNamara, Irish

== Deaths ==
- December 26 – Robert Atkinson, English (born 1883)
