= Niomar Moniz Sodré Bittencourt =

Brazilian journalist (1916–2003)

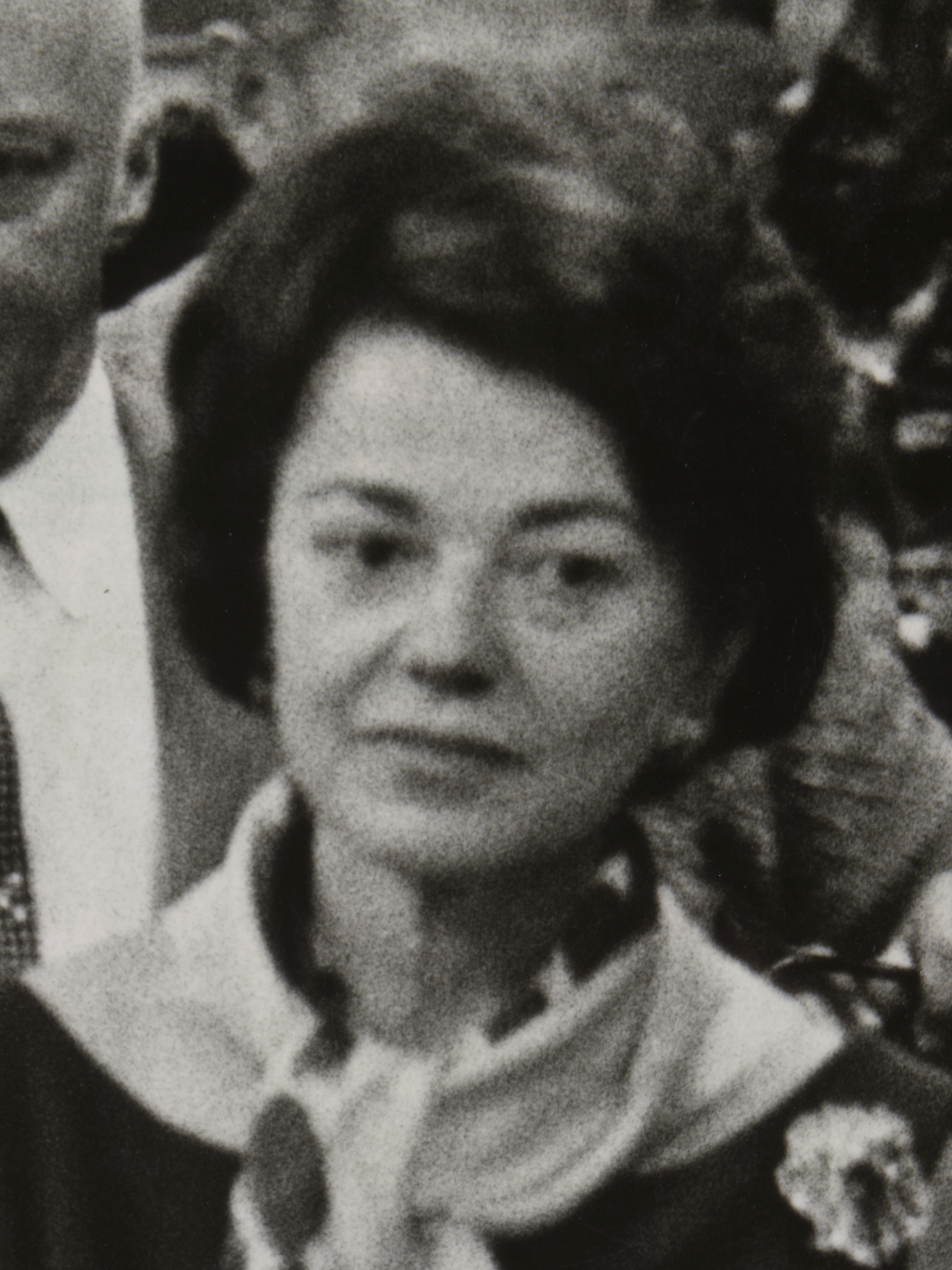
- Sodré Bittencourt in 1965
- Born: 4 September 1916; Salvador, Bahia, Brazil
- Died: 31 October 2003 (aged 87); Rio de Janeiro, Rio de Janeiro, Brazil
- Occupation: Journalist

Niomar Moniz Sodré Bittencourt (4 September 1916 – 31 October 2003) was a Brazilian journalist and businesswoman.

She was the third of four daughters of Maria de Teive Argollo and the Bahian journalist and politician Antônio Muniz Sodré de Aragão. In September 1932 she married her cousin Hélio Moniz Sodré Pereira and from this relationship she had her only son, Antônio Moniz Neto. After separating from Hélio in the early 1940s, she married the journalist and businessman Paulo Bittencourt, owner of the newspaper Correio da Manhã.

Together with Raimundo Castro Maia and Maria Martins, she was one of the people involved in the creation of the Museum of Modern Art, Rio de Janeiro (MAM), having been part of its board of directors for ten years, and she was mainly responsible for the construction of the building designed by Affonso Eduardo Reidy to house the museum in Aterro do Flamengo.

With the death of Paulo Bittencourt in 1963, Niomar assumed the presidency of Correio da Manhã and directed it until 1969. Despite the initial support given to the overthrow of João Goulart demonstrated in the newspaper's editorials, it soon began to criticize the regime implemented with the military coup of 1964, denouncing cases of torture.

On 7 January 1969, she was arrested along with Osvaldo Peralva after the seizure of that day's edition of Correio da Manhã. On 16 January, her political rights were revoked through AI-5 for ten years. She was only released almost two months later. She was sued for the stance taken by her newspaper against the dictatorship. However, in a trial held on 20 November, she was acquitted by the Second Military Audit in a trial attended by the jurist Sebastián Soler.

She died on 31 October 2003 at the Samaritano Hospital, in the south of Rio de Janeiro, due to complications from Alzheimer's disease, which she had suffered for ten years.
