= Luiz Paulo Horta =

Brazilian journalist

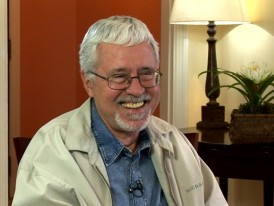
Luiz Paulo Horta

Luiz Paulo de Alencar Parreiras-Horta was a Brazilian journalist. He was born in Rio de Janeiro on August 14, 1943. He died on August 3, 2013, in Rio de Janeiro, at the age of 69.

In 1962 he started a law course at PUC-RJ, before moving on to journalism. He joined the Correio da Manhã in 1963, and the Jornal do Brasil in 1964, where he stayed until 1990. He then moved to O Globo, where he continued to work as a music critic. In 1986, he founded and directed the music section of the Museum of Modern Art in Rio de Janeiro. In 2000 and 2001, he directed a group of biblical studies at the Loyola Center of PUC-RJ.

He was a member of the Brazilian Academy of Music and the Brazilian Academy of Art. He was a member of the Development Council of PUC-RJ and of the Cultural Commission of the Archdiocese of Rio de Janeiro.

In 2000 he received the Padre Ávila Prize for Ethics in Journalism, granted by PUC-RJ. In 2010 he received the Medal of the Inconfidente from the Government of Minas Gerais. He was the seventh occupant of Chair 23, whose Patron was his ancestor José de Alencar, at the Brazilian Academy of Letters, elected on August 21, 2008, and received on November 28 of the same year by academic Tarcísio Padilha.
