= Liljestrand =

Liljestrand is a surname. Notable people with the surname include:

- Göran Liljestrand (1886–1968), Swedish pharmacologist
- Parisa Liljestrand (born 1983), Swedish politician

== Other ==
- Liljestrand House, house in Honolulu, Hawaii, US
