= Carmen Portinho =

Brazilian civil engineer, urbanist, city planner and feminist

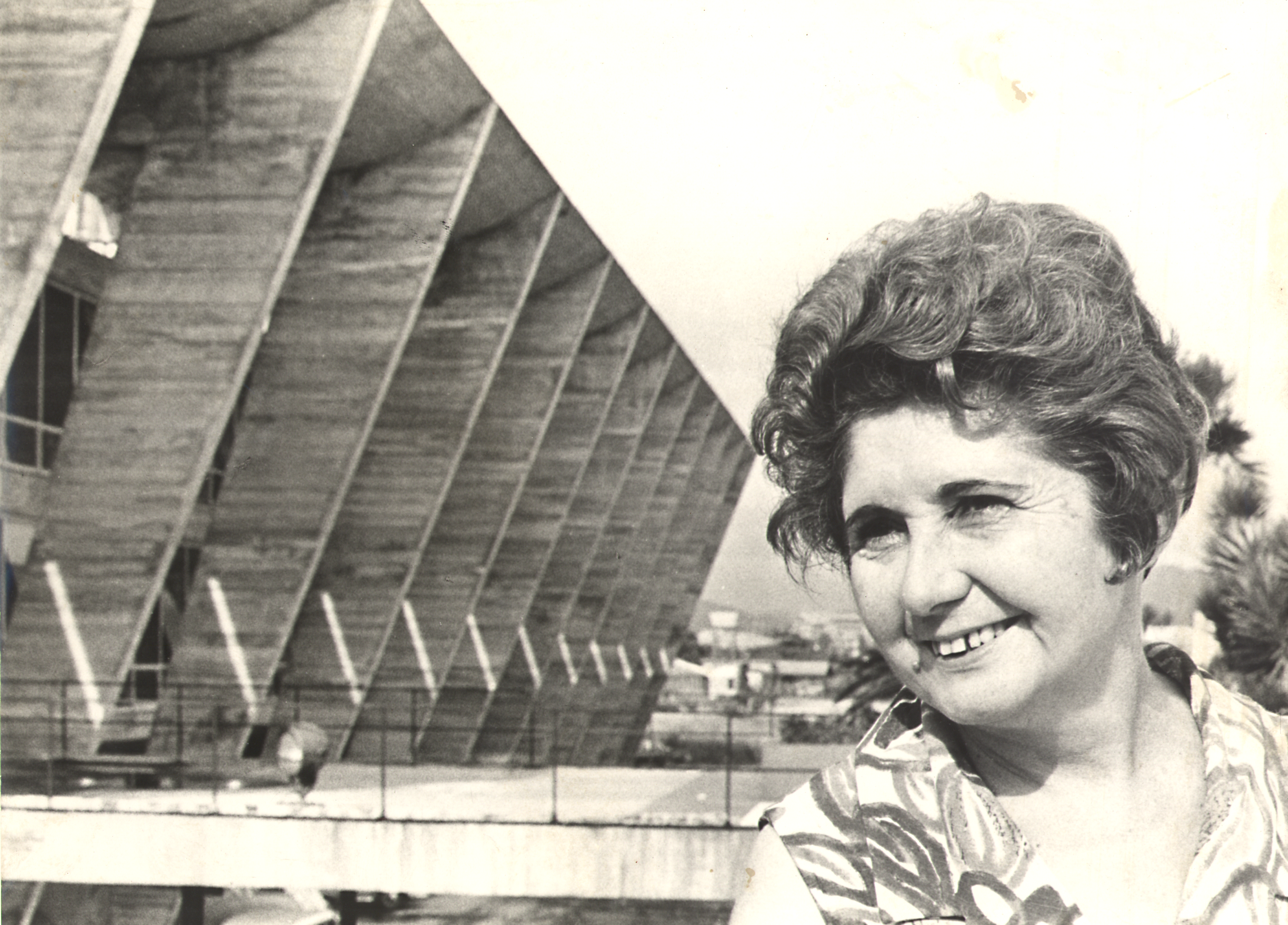
- Portinho in front of Museum of Modern Art Rio
- Born: January 26, 1903; Corumbá, Mato Grosso do Sul, Brazil
- Died: July 25, 2001 (aged 98); Rio de Janeiro, Brazil
- Education: Polytechnic School of the University of Brazil
- Spouse: Affonso Eduardo Reidy

Carmen Velasco Portinho (1903–2001) was a Brazilian civil engineer, urbanist, and feminist. A pioneering woman in her field, Portinho was the third woman to graduate as an engineer in Brazil.

== Life ==
Carmen Velasco Portinho was born on January 26, 1903, in Corumbá, Mato Grosso do Sul, Brazil. At the age of four, Portinho's family moved to Rio de Janeiro. the federal capital at the time, where she soon became involved with the feminist movements, together with Bertha Lutz, for the right of women to vote. The campaigns that happen in the 1920s and 1930s for more rights for women, was where she fought tirelessly for equality between men and women. She was an activist for the education of women and for the valorization of women's work outside the domestic sphere. She graduated in 1925 at the Polytechnic School of the former University of Brazil, today the Federal University of Rio de Janeiro. Upon the completion of her studies in 1925, she became the third woman to graduate as an engineer in Brazil.

In 1929, Portinho enrolled in Brazil's first urban planning course at the University of the Federal District. For her final thesis, she created a conceptual design for the future Brazilian capital.

She married in the early 1930s with doctor Gualter Adolpho Lutz (1903–1969), Bertha Lutz's brother, from whom she separated a few years later. She married a second time to Afonso Eduardo Reidy, a Brazilian architect who designed the Museum of Modern Art in Rio de Janeiro.

== Career ==
In 1926, as soon as she graduated, she was appointed auxiliary engineer by the then mayor of the Federal District, Alaor Prata and thus Carmen joined the board of engineers of the Directorate of Construction and Traffic of the Municipality of the Federal District. She was a professor at Colégio Pedro II, which was a scandal at the time, since this was a male boarding school. The Minister of Justice tried to interfere with her nomination to the college, but Carmen remained teaching for another three years before resigning from the chair.

Due to the machismo within the Municipality's Directorate of Traffic and Works on the part of colleagues who questioned her competence and knowledge, Carmen was challenged several times at work. Her first task in the directorate was to inspect a lightning rod installed on top of the old city hall building, which her colleagues believed she would not overcome. Carmem, however, fulfilled the task because she had training in mountaineering, having climbed all the hills of the city of Rio de Janeiro when she was still a student.

Carmen faced other career difficulties as a woman. Promotions within the department were indicated and not due competence. At the time, President Washington Luiz held a public hearing to hear complaints and requests from officials and citizens, and Carmen decided to go directly to him to present herself. Carmen got her promotion and still in that decade completed the country's first urbanism course.

She obtained a grant from the British Council to do an internship in commissions for the reconstruction and remodeling of British cities destroyed by the war to complement her studies in urbanism. Her experience abroad made her suggest to the then mayor of Rio de Janeiro the creation of a Department of Popular Housing to remedy the lack of lower income housing, a concept introduced by Carmen.

In the 1950s, Carmen, then director of the Popular Housing Department, proposed the construction of the 'Pedregulho' residential complex in the São Cristóvão neighborhood, whose architectural project was under the responsibility of her husband, Afonso Eduardo Reidy. The idealization and construction of housing estates gave her national and international projection, making her a renowned engineer. However, with the rise of journalist Carlos Lacerda to the government of Guanabara in 1962, Carmen asked for her retirement due to irreconcilable political divergences with Lacerda.

Even outside the public sphere, Carmen continued to work, however by private initiative. She took over the construction of the Museum of Modern Art in Rio de Janeiro and in 1963 became director of the Superior School of Industrial Design (ESDI), at the invitation of the governor of Guanabara, Francisco Negrão de Lima . ESDI, a pioneer experience in the country and the first industrial design school in Latin America, which had been created in 1962 by the then governor Carlos Lacerda. Even abroad, there were few renowned schools. Carmen ran ESDI for 20 years.

In 1987, Carmen was honored by the National Council for Women's Rights (CNDM) for her fight for women's rights. Among other women, they handed to the then president of the Chamber of Deputies, deputy Ulisses Guimarães, the Women's Letter to the Constituents, which made several demands for women for the new Constitution.

=== Popular housing ===
Carmen is one of those responsible for introducing the concept of popular housing in Brazil. luenced by her experiences in Europe and on her visit to the French architect Le Corbusier, Carmen proposed to the then mayor of Rio de Janeiro the construction of popular housing estates that were equipped with social services, fleeing isolated buildings in blocks or individual houses.

The most important examples of collective housing in Rio de Janeiro are those of the Pedregulho Housing Complex (1948) and Gávea (1952). Both were idealized as an undulating ribbon - association with the proposal of the continuous urban strip that Le Corbusier formulated in 1929 - that was molded on the rugged topography of both lands.

=== Museum of Modern Art of Rio de Janeiro ===
As the only woman on a construction site with more than 450 workers, Carmen was in charge of all decisions regarding the construction. The museum, which struggled for two years to get off the ground in 1954, was designed by Afonso Eduardo Reidy, with an all-metal structure on Avenida Beira-Mar. In addition to urbanism, Carmen was also advancing in the visual arts, aware of the role of the museum for local art and for the new urban project in Rio de Janeiro. Carmen organized and held several art and architecture exhibitions, taking renowned Brazilian names abroad, such as Ivan Serpa, Fayga Ostrower, Arthur Luiz Piza - all young people linked to abstract art - and architects, like Oscar Niemeyer, Alcides Rocha Miranda, Jorge Moreira and Affonso Eduardo Reidy.

Portinho's contributions to Brazilian architecture were recognized in a 2025-2026 exhibition Carmen Portinho: Modernity in Construction at the Museum of Modern Art in Rio de Janeiro.
