= Gustavo Capanema Palace =

Modernist office building in Rio de Janeiro, Brazil

- Palácio Gustavo Capanema
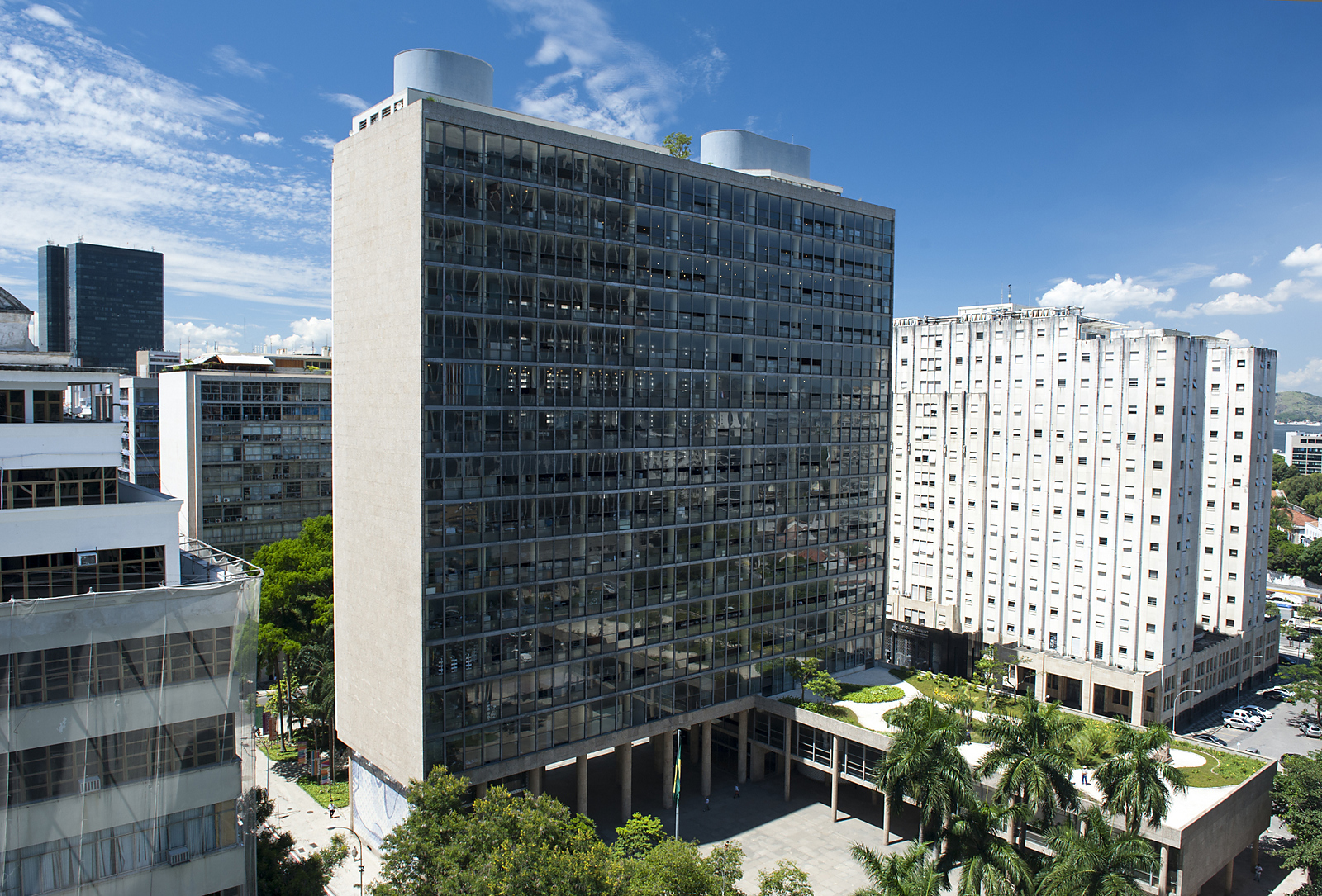
- Southern façade

- Location within Rio de Janeiro

General information
- Architectural style: Modernism
- Location: Rio de Janeiro, Brazil
- Coordinates: 22°54′33.12″S 43°10′25.78″W
- Current tenants: Ministry of Culture
- Construction started: 1937
- Completed: 1945
- Owner: Federal government of Brazil

Technical details
- Floor count: 16

Design and construction
- Architects: Lúcio Costa; Carlos Leão; Oscar Niemeyer; Affonso Eduardo Reidy; Ernâni Vasconcelos; Jorge Machado Moreira; Le Corbusier
- Engineer: Emílio Henrique Baumgart

National Historic Heritage of Brazil
- Designated: 1948
- Reference no.: 375-T-1948

The Gustavo Capanema Palace (Portuguese: Palácio Gustavo Capanema), also known architecturally as the Ministry of Education and Health Building, is a government office building in downtown Rio de Janeiro, Brazil. As the first modernist project in Brazil, it is historically important to the architectural development of Modernism in the country and has been placed on Brazil's UNESCO tentative list.

== History ==
It is one of the finest examples of Brazilian 1930s modernist architecture, designed in 1935 and 1936. It was designed by a team composed of Lucio Costa (future designer of the master plan of Brazil's modernist capital Brasília), along with Affonso Eduardo Reidy, Ernani Vasconcellos, Carlos Leão, Jorge Machado Moreira, and Roberto Burle Marx. Oscar Niemeyer, who became Brazil's best-known architect later, had a role as an intern in Costa's office. The group invited renowned Swiss-French Modernist architect Le Corbusier to oversee the project. Construction was begun by the Getúlio Vargas government in 1939 and was completed in 1945, to house Brazil's new Ministry of Education and Health.

In 1960 the national capital moved to Brasília, and the building became a regional Rio office for the ministry. The Ministry of Education and Health has since been divided into three: the Ministry of Education, Ministry of Health, and the Ministry of Culture, all in the building to the present day.

== Architecture ==
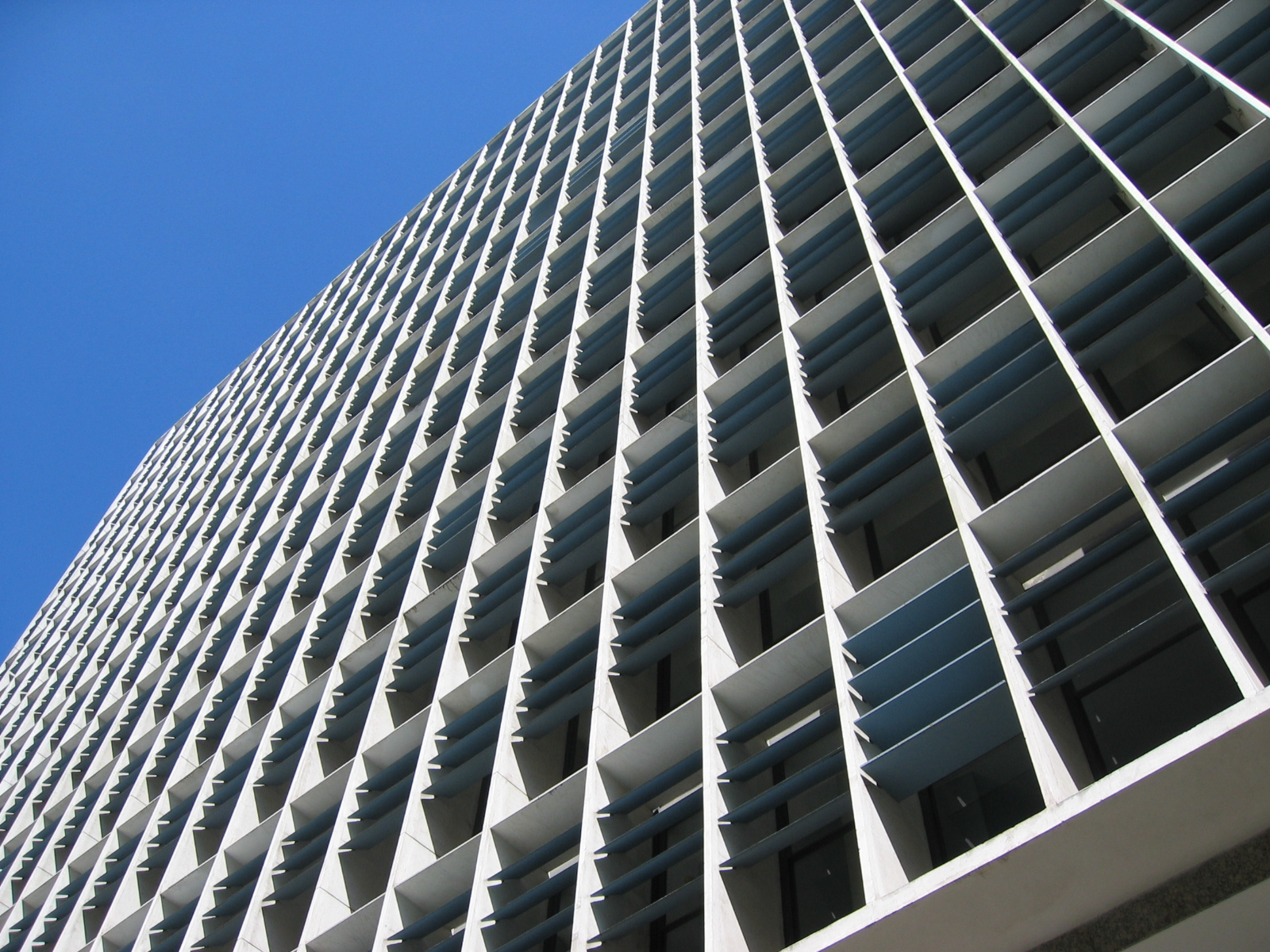
Adjustable brises-soleil (sun-shades) on glass façade.

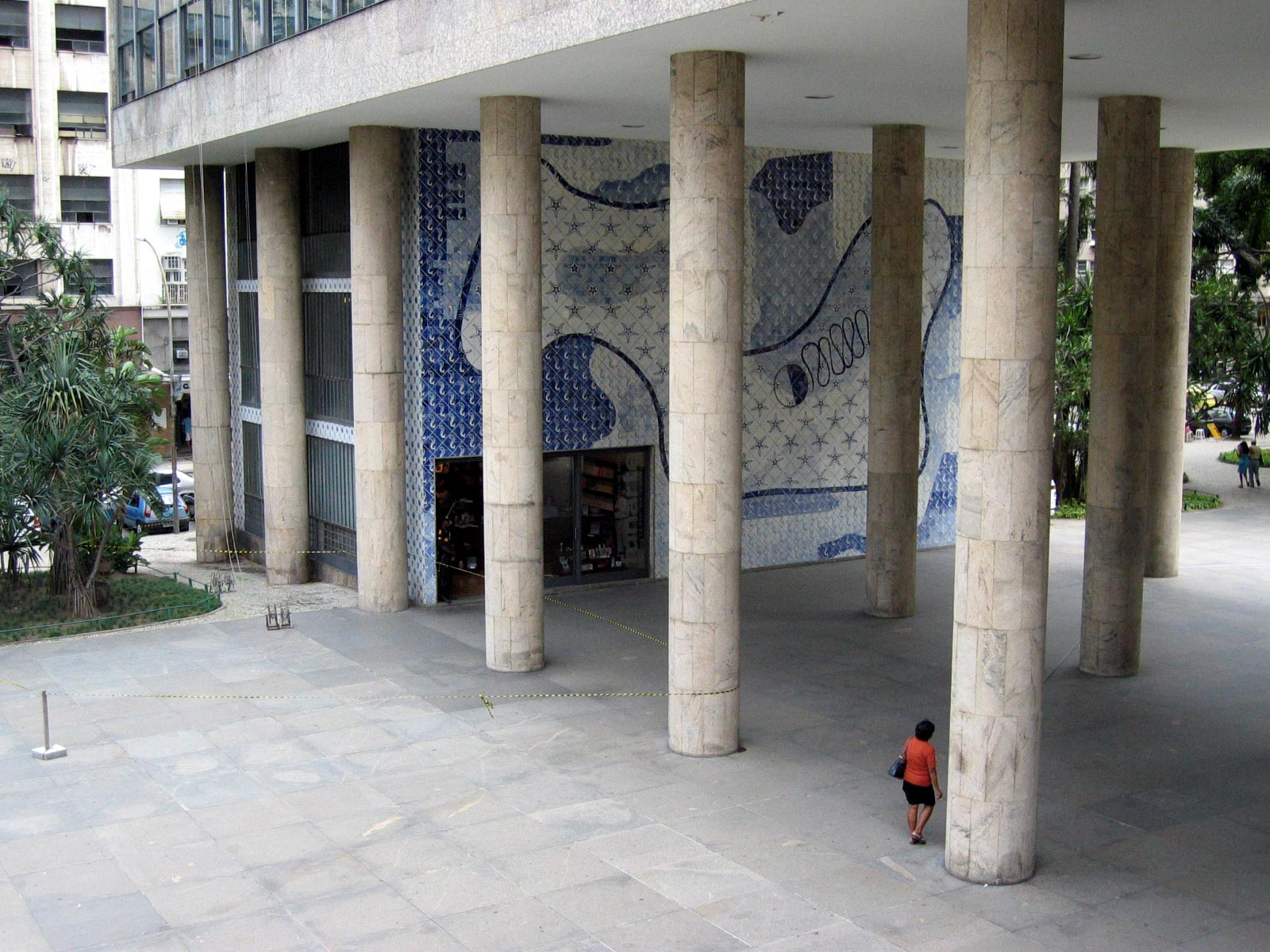
Pilotis (pillars) and modernist azulejo mural, south view of main entrance.

=== Description ===
The building is named after author and educator Gustavo Capanema, who was the first Minister of Education of Brazil. It is located at Rua da Imprensa, 16, in the downtown Rio area of Castelo. Delighted with the shape of Guanabara Bay, Corbusier suggested that the building should be located next to the sea, instead of on an inner downtown street, but the government declined

The project was extremely bold for the time. It was the first modernist public building in the Americas, and on a much larger scale than anything Le Corbusier had built until then. Modernism as an aesthetic movement had a great impact in Brazil, and the building—which housed the office charged with cultivating Brazilian formal culture—included various elements of the movement. It also employed local materials and techniques, such as azulejos, blue and white glazed tiles linked to the Portuguese Colonial tradition, in modern wall murals.

Despite being a large office building of 15 stories, the structure has a distinct lightness to it, as it is raised 3 floors above the sidewalk on pilotis (pillars) with access unobstructed from surrounding sidewalks and pedestrian areas. The building embraces bold colours and contrasts of right angles and flowing curves, such as the vitreous blue curving structures on the roof hiding the water tanks and elevator machinery. An internal concrete frame allowed the two broad sides of the building to be entirely of glass. Tropical sunshine on northern glass walls is controlled by Corbusian brises-soleil (sun-shades) made adjustable in a system that was the first of its kind in the world.

Modernist tropical gardens were laid out by the great landscape architect Roberto Burle Marx, and included native plants of Brazil the plant palette, unique at the time. A midlevel roof garden was designed to be seen 'in plan view' from the many floors of office windows above. Trees at ground level included majestic Imperial Palms (Roystonea oleracea).

The building also included specially commissioned works of other Brazilian artists. Most notable are the mural tiles outside and large wall paintings inside by Cândido Portinari, one of Brazil's most famous painters.

=== Historical importance ===
Aesthetics

The building is especially important in the architectural history of Brazil. Modernism gained great momentum as a significant "turning of the page" aesthetic, from the "old" Brazil of Eurocentric post-colonial urban sensibilities, and a countrywide rural, undeveloped and impoverished, and conservative image. Members of the design group developed a uniquely Brazilian Modern architectural vocabulary, creating a style that became virtually official and predominant in the country into the 1980s.

Beside Costa, Oscar Niemeyer, and Roberto Burle Marx, were responsible in the late 1950s and early 1960s for the master plan, architecture, and landscape design of the new national capital of Brasília. Burle Marx designed the master plan of Flamengo Park (Aterro do Flamengo), the 1950s modernist park and grand urban open space along Guanabara Bay in Rio. Affonso Eduardo Reidy designed the Museum of Modern Art—MAM (Museu de Arte Moderna, 1955) located there, and Burle Marx its gardens.

Politics

The Capanema Palace is also interesting and contradictory in political history. Le Corbusier and the European modernist architects formed various leftist schools of thought, and the Brazilian Modernist movement was also left-leaning, with some of its proponents, such as Oscar Niemeyer, active in the Communist Party of Brazil. Yet the ministry building was commissioned by a government of the "Vargas Era" that had taken power by force in 1930, and moved further right into outright dictatorship in 1937. Getúlio Vargas, interim president and dictator from 1930 to 1945, jailed leftists and copied elements of Italian fascism in his attempted re-founding of Brazil as an "Estado Novo," or "New State."

This was just as fascism and dictatorship were reaching peak power in Europe, and Vargas dabbled with loyalty to the Axis. Brazil, however, ultimately sided with the Allies in Second World War. The Gustavo Capanema Palace was finished in mid-World War II (1943), as Brazilian soldiers were being sent to Italy to fight against fascism. The modernist Monument to the dead of World War II (1960) commemorating Brazil's participation and losses in the war, is in Flamengo Park.

== UNESCO List ==
The building was added by Brazil to its UNESCO World Heritage tenative list in 1996, and indication the country intends to pursue full inscription under the cultural criteria. The UNESCO tenative list submission indicates the building was the first modernist structure in Brazil and that it influenced all future modernist projects in the country.

== In media ==
Film

There is a footage of the setting of the first stone of the building, supposedly shot by Humberto Mauro, the most important Brazilian filmmaker of the time. In those scenes, minister Gustavo Capanema is shown delivering a speech. Also visible are modernist poet Carlos Drummond de Andrade, aide to Capanema, and the intellectual Roquette Pinto, among others.

The footage is currently kept at the CTAv - Centro Técnico Audiovisual (Audiovisual Technical Center) archive, in Rio de Janeiro. It was included in the feature-length documentary Pampulha ou a invenção do mar de Minas, directed by Oswaldo Caldeira.

Publications

The building, usually named as the 'Ministry of Education and Health Building,' has been a subject in numerous international architecture and landscape architecture survey and photo-centric books on Brazilian Modernism, and on the works of Lucio Costa, Roberto Burle Marx, and Oscar Niemeyer.
