= Boettcher Estate =

Historic house in Hawaii, United States

- U.S. National Register of Historic Places
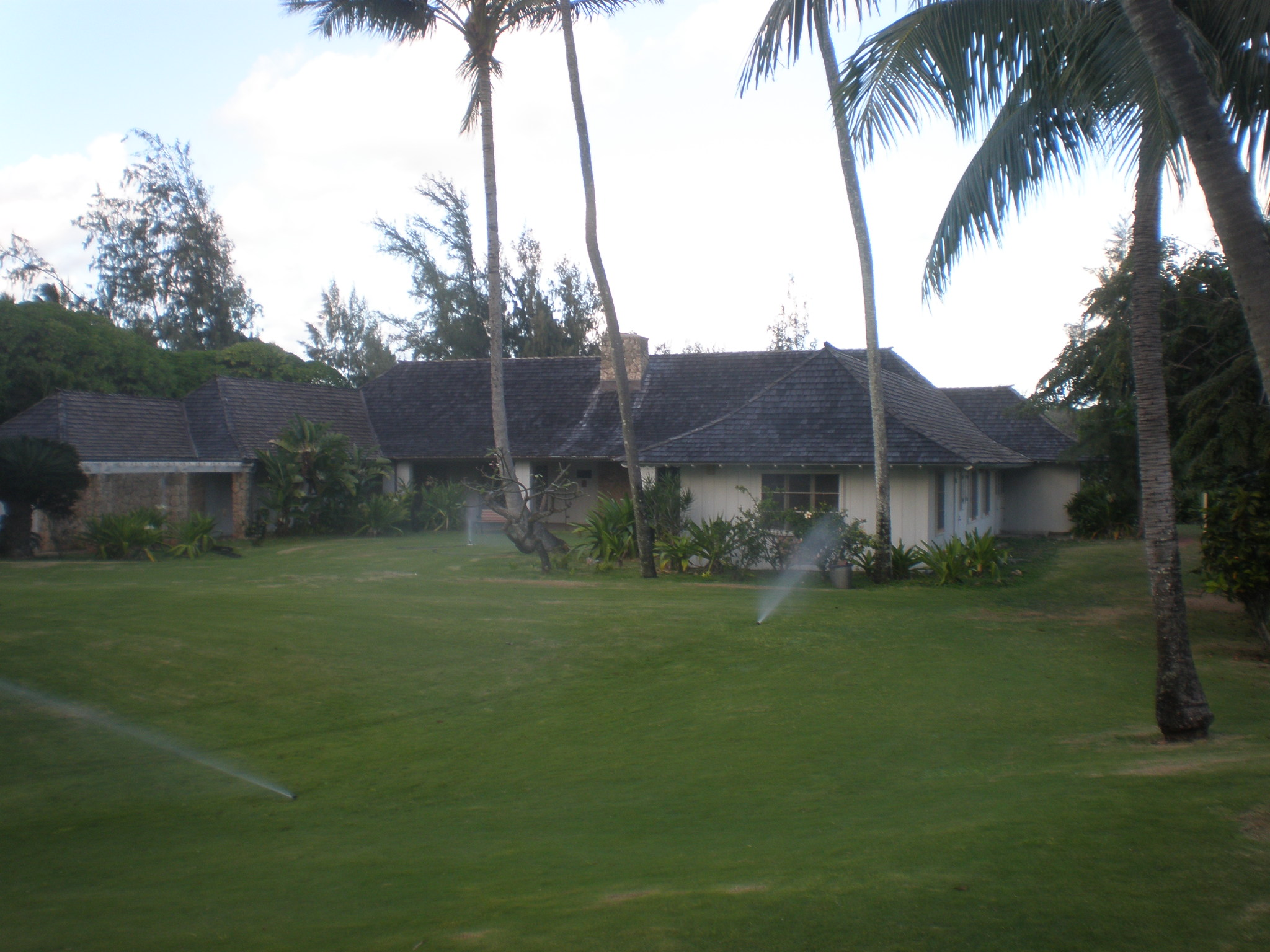
- Boettcher Estate house

- Location within Hawaii
- Nearest city: Kailua, Hawaii
- Coordinates: 21°24′12″N 157°44′17″W
- Area: 4 acres (1.6 ha)
- Built: 1937
- Architect: Vladimir Ossipoff, M. Kiuchi
- Architectural style: Hawaiian style
- NRHP reference No.: 02000388
- Added to NRHP: April 26, 2002

Boettcher Estate, also known as Kalama Beach Park, is a former beachfront estate in Kailua, Honolulu County, Hawaii, with a house designed by Vladimir Ossipoff and landscape designed by Richard Tongg.

== History ==
The original home was designed for the Boettcher family in 1937 by Vladimir Ossipoff soon after he opened his own firm in Honolulu. After the city assumed ownership, the house and its 4-acre (1.6 ha) lot were restored and redesigned in several phases by Mason Architects of Honolulu to serve as Kalama Beach Park.

The area called Kalama (which means "The Torch" in the Hawaiian language) was Kailua's first housing tract, developed in 1925 by Harold K.L. Castle, who named it after Queen Kalama, the wife of King Kamehameha III, who previously owned the land in the Kailua area.

Mae Bleakie Boettcher, the widow of the original owner and trustee of the Denver-based Boettcher Foundation, sold her estate to the City and County of Honolulu. She died in 2001.

It became a municipal park in 1978 and was listed on the National Register of Historic Places in 2002.
