= Pedregulho Housing Complex =

- Conjunto Residencial Prefeito Mendes de Moraes
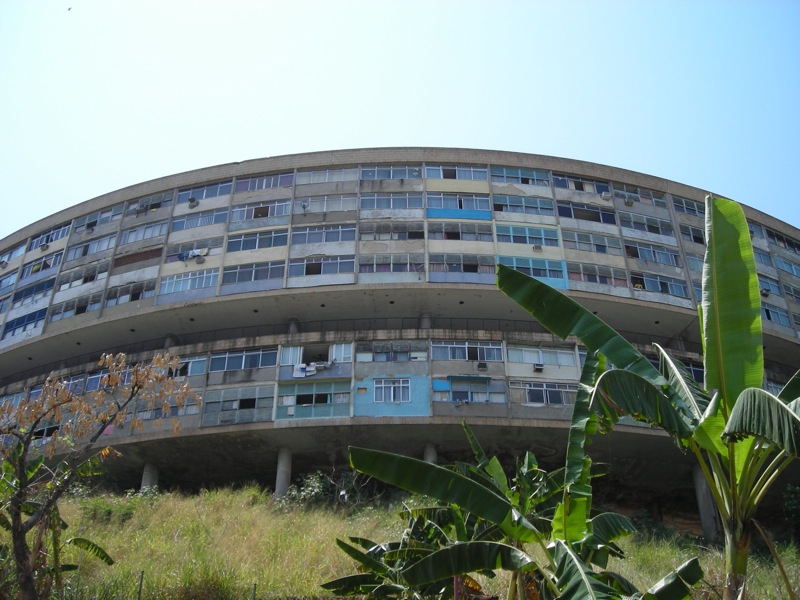
- Apartment building in the Pedregulho Housing Complex

- Location within Rio de Janeiro
- Alternative names: Pedregulho

General information
- Architectural style: Modernist
- Location: Rio de Janeiro, Brazil
- Coordinates: 22.892224°S 43.233152°W
- Groundbreaking: 1949
- Opened: 1951
- Client: Banco Nacional Imobiliário, Companhia Nacional de Investimentos

Technical details
- Floor count: 20
- Floor area: 41,000 square metres (440,000 ft^{2})

Design and construction
- Architect: Affonso Eduardo Reidy

The Pedregulho Housing Complex (Portuguese: Conjunto Residencial Prefeito Mendes de Moraes, commonly known as Pedregulho) is an apartment complex and planned community in the São Cristóvão neighborhood of Rio de Janeiro, Brazil. It was designed by the architect Affonso Eduardo Reidy (1909-1964) with his partner Carmen Portinho serving as the chief engineer. The project was planned in 1946 to house lower-paid civil servants of the city, which was then the Federal District of Brazil. Work commenced on the complex in 1949 and inaugurated in 1951/1952.

== Location and design ==
The Pedregulho Housing Complex is located on a hill called Pedregulho, from which it takes its name. It was followed by other public housing works by Reidy, which included the Gávea Residential Unit (1952) and the Armando Gonzaga Theater in the planned neighborhood of Marechal Hermes (1950). The principles and aesthetics of Le Corbusier are evident in the buildings; the curved lines, undulating designs, arches, and domes recall the design of Oscar Niemeyer's Pampulha project in Belo Horizonte.

== Apartment building ==
The main apartment building consists of a long, serpentine block suspended above pilotis. 272 units are placed on seven stories. Reidy attempted to provide a view of Guanabara Bay from each apartment unit. The single entrance to the building is via two gangplanks that lead to the third floor; its location at the middle of the building mitigated the need for elevators. The first and second floor consist of single-level studio apartments with a view to the city. The third floor is reserved for administrative offices, a children's theater, nursery, and kindergarten. The upper levels contain two-story family units accessed from the fourth and sixth floors; the main living quarters are on the lower level and bedrooms on the upper level.

Two smaller apartment blocks sit below the main apartment building to the south. These consist of duplex apartments and open to Rua Lopes Trovão.

== Additional buildings ==
The complex, in its original form, included a public services building, shopping center, children's garden, nursery, primary school, sports courts, gymnasium, swimming pool, and health center. The gymnasium strongly resembles the parabolic structure of Niemeyer's Church of Saint Francis of Assisi in Pampulha. Like the church at Pampulha it features a large-scale azulejo mosaic by Candido Portinari on its street-facing façade.

== Reception ==
The Pedregulho Housing Complex was well received at the time of its completion. It won first prize at the International Architecture Competition at the 1st Biennial of São Paulo in 1951. It was admired by European architects, notably Max Bill in 1953 and by Le Corbusier during his tour of Brazil in 1962. The architect and writer Alfredo Britto considers the complex "one of the great symbols of Brazilian modern architecture."

== Status ==
The housing complex of Pedregulho suffered from great dilapidation and was described as "favela-like." In contrast, the school, gymnasium, and swimming pool of the complex retained their original purpose and remained in good condition. The azuleijo mosaic by Portinari has also remained in its original condition.

The complex was registered as a cultural property in 2011 by the State of Rio de Janeiro. Restoration of the iconic serpentine building began in 2010 and was completed in 2015.

Rommulo Vieira Conceição's work titled "Space can be an idea or the measure of m2" was featured in the 2025-2026 retrospective exhibition Carmen Portinho: Modernity in Construction at the Museu de Arte Moderna, Rio de Janeiro. Conceição's installation includes video interviews of residents of the Pedregulho Housing Complex and traces the history of the facility to the present day.
