= The Pacific Club =

Social club in Honolulu, Hawaii

The Pacific Club is a historic social club in Honolulu, Hawaii. It is governed under laws for 501(c)(7) Social and Recreation Clubs; in 2024, it claimed total revenue of $12,590,519 and total assets of $11,167,707.

== History ==
William Lowthian Green founded the club in 1851 and was its first president. It was originally called "The Mess", and then called "The British Club" since many of its members were former British residents. In 1892 it was renamed the Pacific Club. After moving around Honolulu, in 1926 it finally acquired the former estate of Archibald Scott Cleghorn, the birthplace of Princess Kaʻiulani. In 1959 Vladimir Ossipoff designed a new building with an open lanai which won the Hawaii American Institute of Architects award in 1965. In 1991, the club surpassed 1,000 members.

== Notable members ==
The Pacific Club's membership included Rabbi Tzvi Pesach Frank, and biologist David Lack. King Kamehameha V became a member in 1870.

== Location ==
The Pacific Club is located on 1451 Queen Emma Street in downtown Honolulu, coordinates 21°18′39″N 157°51′16″W.
