= Vladimir Ossipoff =

Russian architect

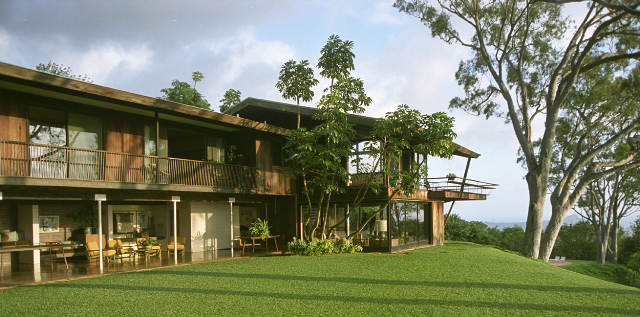
The Liljestrand House – makai (towards the ocean) elevation

Vladimir ‘Val’ Nicholas Ossipoff (Russian: Владимир Николаевич Осипов; November 25, 1907 – October 1, 1998) was an American architect best known for his works in the state of Hawai'i.

== Life ==
=== Early life and schooling ===
Ossipoff was born November 25, 1907, in Vladivostok, a part of the Russian Empire. Because his father, Nicholas Ossipoff, an officer in the Imperial Russian Army, became a military attaché in the Russian embassy in Japan, his family moved in 1909 to Tokyo where Val Ossipoff grew up. Before he was 10, he traveled between Russia and Japan four or five times with his family and was in Petrograd during the Revolution of 1917. Prior to moving to the United States in 1923, he attended Yokohama's St. Joseph's College and the Tokyo Foreign School, which are international schools for children, and was fluent in Russian, Japanese, and English. His family was at their summer home near Mt. Fuji when the Great Tokyo Earthquake of 1923 occurred. Immediately after the Great Tokyo Earthquake, he, his siblings, and his mother emigrated from Kobe to the United States by ship which passed through Yokohama and Honolulu along the way. Prior to leaving for the United States, he visited the construction of Tokyo's Second Imperial Hotel designed by Frank Lloyd Wright and was greatly influenced by Wright's organic architectural style. His father died tragically in Japan before he could rejoin his family in the United States. After graduating from high school in Berkeley, California, in 1926 and from the University of California, Berkeley in 1931, he took two short jobs in California, one with a Los Angeles architect and the other with the San Francisco firm Crim, Reasing, and McGinnis while he did some moonlighting jobs with one of his professors. While at Berkeley, he was trained in the First Bay Region Tradition of vernacular architecture influenced by the style of the Arts and Crafts movement.

=== Early career and marriage ===
Later in 1931, he moved to Honolulu, Hawaii, to visit his high school friend and college roommate, Douglas Slaten, who convinced him to look for work among the California trained architects in Honolulu. Val later stated that Slaten said, "You don't have anything to lose. Why don't you come over." Val said, in the early 1960s, that he moved to Honolulu to carry on a "War on Ugliness," a struggle to counter what he felt was poor architectural design and unrestricted development of Honolulu. He found work with the architect Charles W. Dickey and assisted in Dickey's 1931 design for the Immigration Station at Honolulu Harbor which was constructed in 1934. He left Dickey, briefly did some perspective works for Ray Morris who was the head of Lewers and Cooke's building department, and then worked as the head of Theo H. Davies & Co. Home Building Department beginning in May 1932 until the end of September 1935. At the end of 1932, his first design for a home was for A. W. Manz in Kāhala where he also designed several other homes there in a Bishop Estate subdivision in a modest modified Monterey style because he felt that the climate in Honolulu is similar to the climate in the summer in Carmel, California, where it is "thoroughly enjoyable and outdoors". During that time he married the former Raelyn Loughery from San Francisco on January 24, 1935. (Note: Val and Rae Ossipoff have two children, Alexandra and Valerie.) In October 1935, Ossipoff joined his school friend Tommy Perkins at Stiehl before he returned to C. W. Dickey and assisted with the drawings for the Kula Sanatorium, designed the lights at the Waikiki Theatre's lobby and did the Hunnewell house, which was located at today's Kawaikui Beach Park, just Kokohead of 'Aina Haina on the beach. In March 1936, he formed his own architectural firm in Honolulu, Vladimir Ossipoff, AIA, which later became Ossipoff and Associates. The first house he designed with his own firm was for Cyril E. and Milme Pemberton on Makiki Heights, Honolulu.

== Awards and memberships ==
Ossipoff was elected a Fellow of the American Institute of Architects in 1956. He later served as Chancellor of the AIA College of Fellows in 1966. He was awarded the first medal of honor of the AIA Hawaii chapter. He was a member of The Pacific Club, for which he designed a new building in 1959.

== Death ==
He died October 1, 1998, in Honolulu at the Kuakini Hospital at the age of 90.

== Legacy ==
In 2007, the Honolulu Museum of Art organized the first museum retrospective of his work. "Hawaiian Modern: The Architecture of Vladimir Ossipoff" was on view at the academy from November 29, 2007, to January 27, 2008. The show was planned to travel next to the German Architecture Museum in Frankfurt, Germany (Summer 2008) and the Yale School of Architecture Gallery in New Haven, Connecticut (Fall 2008).

Ossipoff has been called “the master of Hawaii modern architecture,” “the dean of residential architects in Hawaii,” and “the premier postwar designer of kama'aina-style residences in Honolulu,” perhaps the most famous of which is the Liljestrand House built in 1952. Of the dozens of homes and buildings he created, the IBM Building (1962) in the current Ward Village is Ossipoff's most recognized design. Other well known buildings he designed in and around Honolulu include the Goodsill House (1952), the Pauling House (1957), Thurston Memorial Chapel for Punahou School (1966), Davies Memorial Chapel at Hawaii Preparatory Academy (1966), and many more on Oahu. Others across the state of Hawaii include the terminals at the Kahului Airport on Maui and the Kona Airport on the Big Island. From 1970 to 1978, he designed the open-air grand lānai style terminal at the Daniel K. Inouye International Airport in Honolulu. The beaches of Lanikai in Kailua, and the flatlands of ʻĀina Haina and Kāhala along with the heights of Hawaii Loa and the Wai'alae Nui Ridge neighborhoods in Honolulu have many of his designed homes.

"An architect has to be a bit of a sociologist, lawyer and psychologist. He has to know human nature."

— Vladimir Ossipoff,

Works by Vladimir Ossipoff
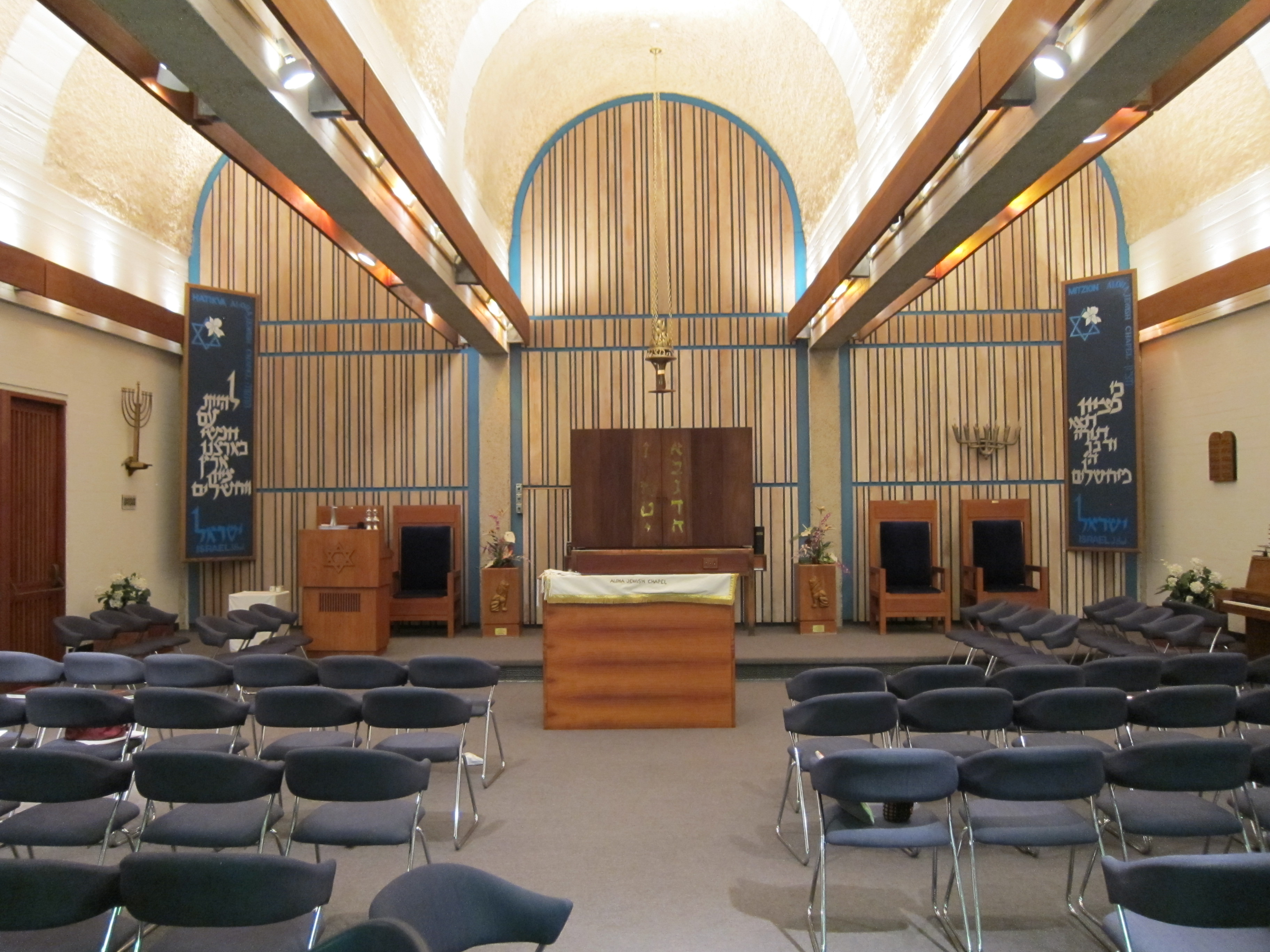
Interior of Aloha Jewish Chapel on Joint Base Pearl Harbor–Hickam

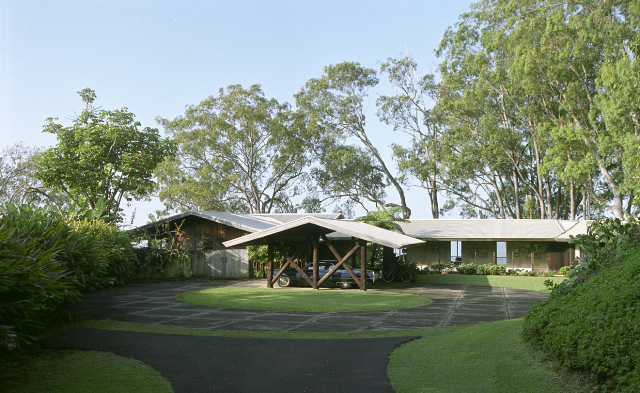
View from driveway of Liljestrand House, on National Register of Historic Places

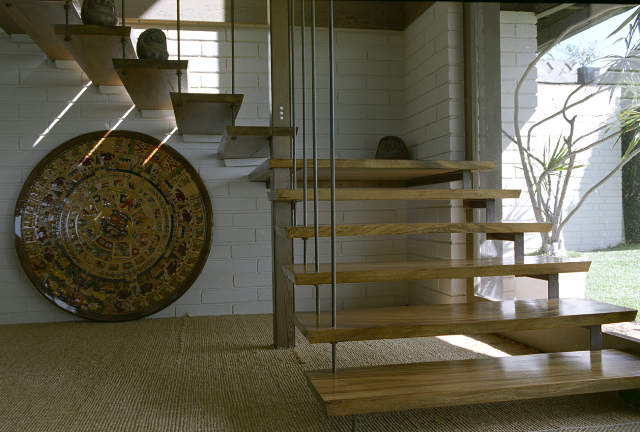
Liljestrand House stairway

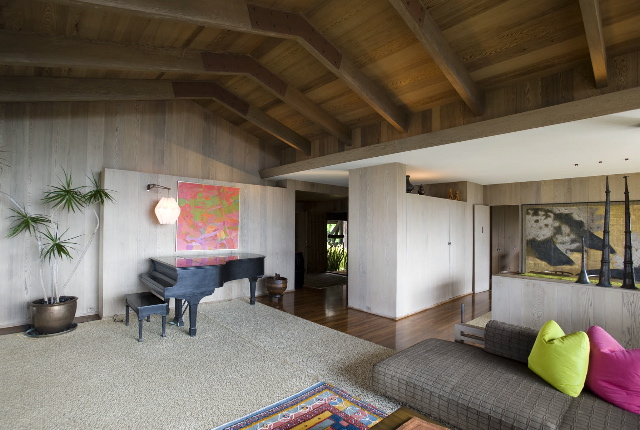
Liljestrand House - living room facing door

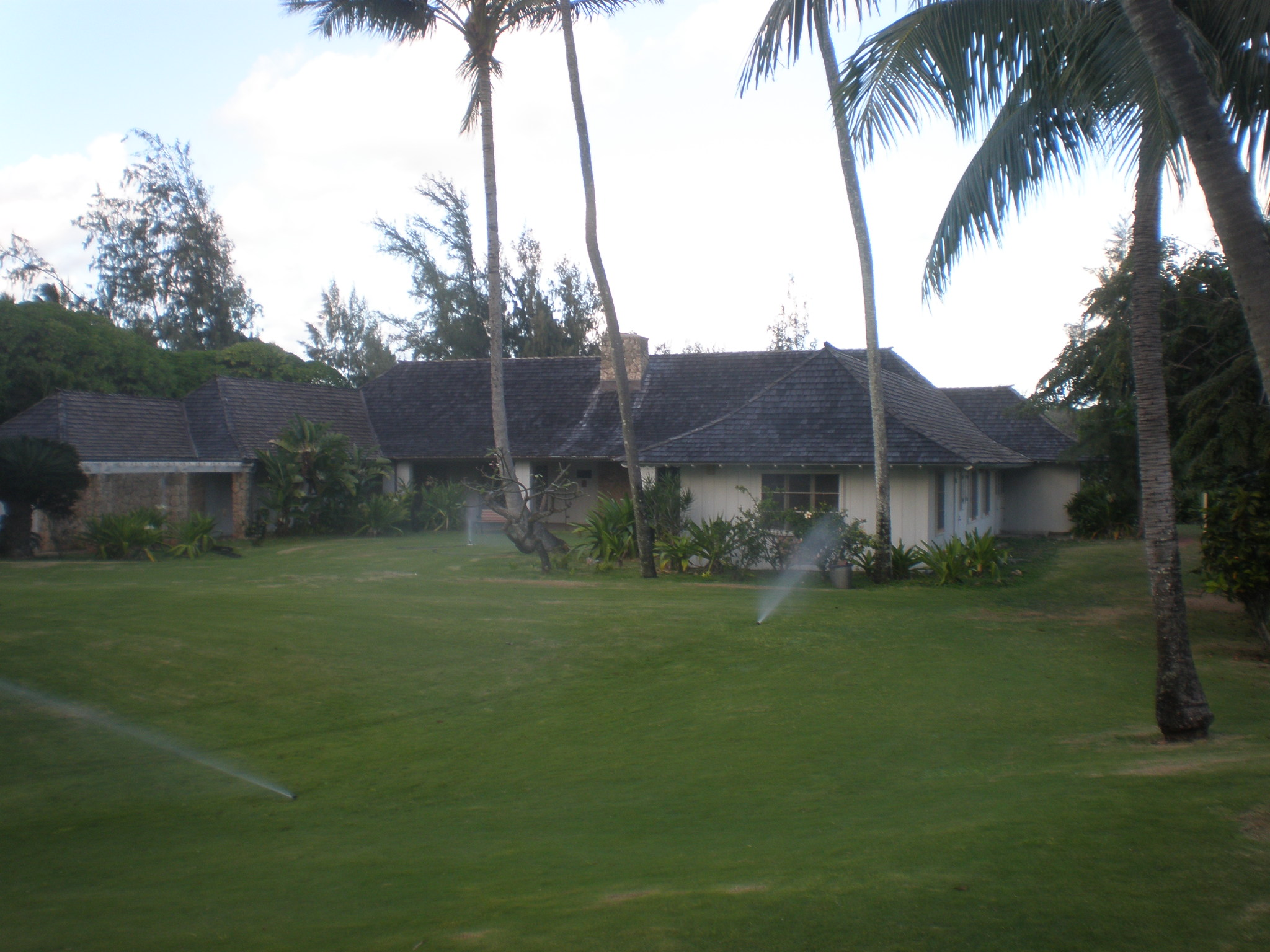
Boettcher Estate

== Ossipoff Documents Restoration Project ==
A collection of sixty-six boxes of Vladimir Ossipoff's drawings and papers was bequeathed to Hamilton Library at the University of Hawaiʻi at Mānoa. As of October 2013 there is a fundraising campaign on Indiegogo for the preservation and presentation of this collection of architectural documents.

== Bibliography ==
- Britton, Karla and Marc Treib, Hawaiian Modern: The Architecture of Vladimir Ossipoff, Yale University Press, 2015 ISBN 9780300214161
- Haar, Francis, Artists of Hawaii: Volume Two, University of Hawaii Press, Honolulu, 1977, pp. 59–63
