= Mies Building for the Eskenazi School of Art, Architecture + Design =

Building at Indiana University Bloomington

Coordinates: 39°10′9″N 86°31′0″W

The Mies Building for the Eskenazi School of Art, Architecture + Design is a building on Indiana University's (IU) Bloomington campus in Bloomington, Indiana, United States. The building is based on a 1952 design that Mies van der Rohe created for the Pi Lambda Phi fraternity, which was not carried out because of insufficient funds. After the plans were rediscovered by Indiana University alumnus Sidney Eskenazi in 2013, construction started in 2019, with the building being completed in 2022. The structure measures 60 by 140 feet (18 by 43 m) across, spanning two levels; the lower level is mostly open-air, while the upper level houses most of the academic spaces.

== History ==
=== Original plans ===
Mies had been hired in 1950 to draw up plans for a fraternity house. The plans were commissioned on behalf of the university's Pi Lambda Phi chapter, which was then located along East Third Street in Bloomington, Indiana. Mies had become involved with the fraternity-house project because of two businessmen, Joseph Cantor and Harry Berke. Both men, who were IU graduates and former members of the fraternity, had hired Mies to design an unbuilt bowling alley and drive-in, both in Indianapolis. Sidney Eskenazi, who at the time was an Indiana University student and a fraternity member, said that the fraternity's existing building was dilapidated and had rat infestations.

The plans were based on those for Mies's Farnsworth House in Plano, Illinois, as well as his 900–910 North Lake Shore apartments in Chicago. The plans were completed in 1952, but Bloomington officials rejected the plans that March because they did not meet Bloomington's zoning code. Mies wrote to the fraternity about funding shortfalls in 1953, offering to bill the fraternity $5 per hour. However, with no funding forthcoming, the project was canceled in 1957, and the plans were largely forgotten when Mies died in 1969. One of the fraternity's presidents ended up owning the plans; when he died in 1985, his widow donated the plans to New York's Museum of Modern Art (MoMA).

=== Revival and development ===
In 2013, the plans were rediscovered by Eskenazi. He had mentioned the project to IU's president Michael McRobbie, who was immediately interested in it. Most university staff and scholars were unaware of Mies's design, and the plans were so obscure that Mies's grandson Dirk Lohan, who had frequently collaborated with his grandfather, later stated that he "had never heard of the project". Eskenazi received sketches and floor plans of the unbuilt building from Mies's office, and he gave the scans to McRobbie. Consultants for the university found the original blueprints at MoMA in 2014. They later discovered additional documents at MoMA and the Art Institute of Chicago. At the time, IU's art school was spread across multiple buildings at IU Bloomington, and it had acquired The Republic Newspaper Office in Columbus, Indiana, in 2018.

Eskenazi and his wife donated $20 million to IU, half of which was to be used to carry out the Mies design; in honor of the donation, IU renamed its School of Art, Architecture + Design after the Eskenazis in April 2019. Lohan and his cousins had to approve the proposal, since they were the copyright holders of their grandfather's plans. The university's trustees approved the structure in August 2019, at which point it was supposed to be finished in two years. Thomas Phifer and Partners, who had previously been hired to design another building on the IU Bloomington campus, was hired to oversee the design of the new building. CDI was hired as the general contractor, Cosentini Associates as the mechanical engineer, and SOM as the structural engineer. The existing blueprints and documents were detailed enough that Phifer's firm had to make only minor modifications to make the plans conform to modern building codes.

Work on the new structure commenced in August 2020, and despite the COVID-19 pandemic, work proceeded quickly because the superstructure had been planned beforehand. The structure was dedicated in June 2021. It ultimately opened in early 2022, and a public open house event for the building took place on April 8, 2022.

== Description ==
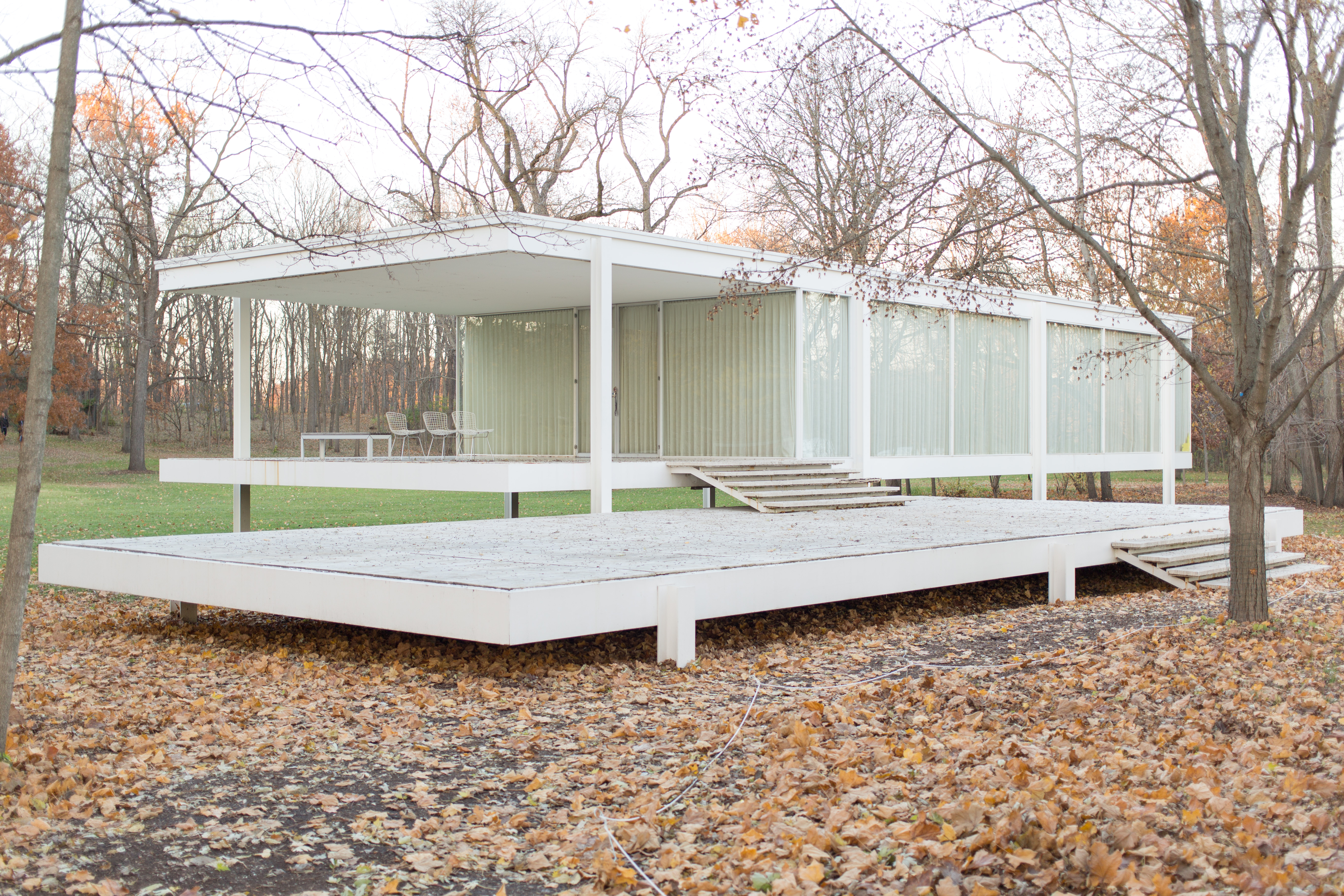
Some of the Mies Building's design features are similar to that of the Farnsworth House (pictured).

Phifer's design adheres closely to Mies's original plans. It sits atop a knoll, leading Phiger to describe it as having a "temple-like presence" on the IU Bloomington campus. It measures 60 by 140 feet (18 by 43 m) across, with two levels, and covers approximately 10,000 square feet (930 m^{2}). The building primarily uses white terrazzo, gray limestone, and painted steel, with furniture by both Mies and Florence Knoll. The glass walls, white steel, and second-story facade are similar to the design features of the Farnsworth House, which Mies had designed almost simultaneously. Because of these similarities, Lohan referred to the building as "the Farnsworth House on steroids".

The lower story has a recessed concrete facade and is mostly an outdoor space. There is an open-air atrium in the middle of the building, passing through the upper story. The upper level is raised 8 feet (2.4 m) above ground level and has a glass facade with steel window frames. It is supported by piers that rest on concrete-mat foundations; the spacing of the piers divides the floor plan into bays measuring 20 by 30 feet (6.1 by 9.1 m) wide. The upper-story facade protrudes about 10 feet (3.0 m) outward from the lower story on two sides. To conform to modern building standards, the structure has an insulated-glass curtain wall, contrasting with the single-paned facade of Mies's original design. Each curtain wall panel measures 1 inch (25 mm) thick, with dimensions of 10 by 10 feet (3.0 by 3.0 m). The soffits on the underside of the roof include further insulation, while the window frames themselves serve as structural support for the building.

The interior spaces have terrazzo and limestone floors, in addition to wooden and white-painted walls. The lower story is devoted mostly to mechanical uses and includes a limestone lobby with four chairs and a table designed by Mies. On the upper level are administrative and academic spaces, including workshops, lecture halls, and classrooms. To meet modern building codes, the structure has an elevator, and the mechanical rooms and restrooms were enlarged from the original plans. Whereas the original plans called for a single stair at the eastern end, the modern building has a second emergency stair, which is located at the western end of the building. These features decreased the size of the lobby. In addition, the building is heated and cooled by a radiant heating system in the floor slab, as well as fresh-air ventilation ducts and fan coil units. The heating, ventilation, and air conditioning system is concealed within the superstructure's steel beams. To accommodate the mechanical systems, the floor slab was reduced in thickness from 15 to 14 inches (380 to 360 mm).

== Reception ==
The Architect's Newspaper described the structure in 2021 as "an outlier in the modernist doyen's extraordinary stateside career", in part because it had been designed for a fraternity instead of a single resident. When the Eskenazi School building was completed, the magazine Hyperallergic described it as "an exemplar of Mies's signature understated but innovative style". Wallpaper magazine wrote that the central atrium gave the building a transparent milieu and that the building "is a true treasure to behold" because of its similarities to the Farnsworth House and Mies's earlier work for the Illinois Institute of Technology campus.
