= Correio da Manhã (Brazil) =

Brazilian newspaper

Correio da Manhã ("Morning Post") was a daily newspaper of the Brazilian metropolis Rio de Janeiro, published from 1901 to 1974. It was founded by Edmundo and Paulo Bittencourt. The paper prided itself to value information over opinion.

Throughout its history the paper was characterised by being in opposition to incumbent presidents, which led to occasional prosecution and closure. Some of its owners and managers were imprisoned on occasions.

After the 1964 Brazilian coup d'état the opposition continued and led to the temporary arrest of owner Niomar Moniz Sodré Bittencourt (1916-2003), daughter in-law of co-founder Edmundo Bittencourt, whose husband Paulo Bittencourt deceased in 1963. Under pressure of the government, advertisers ceased to support the paper, which eventually led to its demise in 1974.

== Notable writers ==
Pierre Clostermann, before becoming the first French ace of the Second World War (nicknamed by Charles de Gaulle as "First Fighter of France"), wrote columns in this newspaper in 1937.
