= Liljestrand House =

Historic house in Hawaii, United States

- U.S. National Register of Historic Places
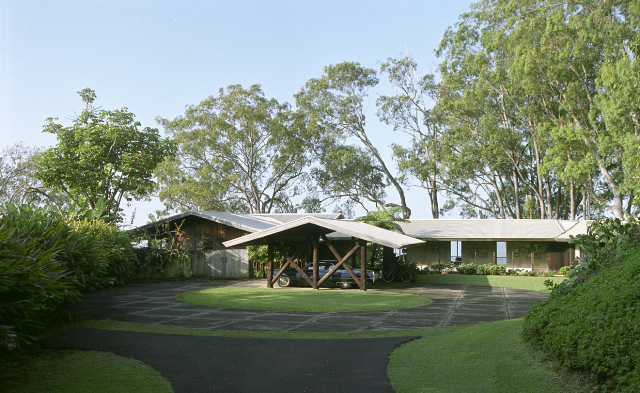
- View from driveway side (upslope)

- Location within Hawaii
- Location: 3300 Tantalus Dr., Honolulu, Hawaii
- Coordinates: 21°19′27″N 157°49′52″W
- Area: 1 acre (0.40 ha)
- Built: 1952
- Architect: Vladimir Ossipoff
- Architectural style: Hawaiian Modern
- NRHP reference No.: 08000207
- Added to NRHP: March 26, 2008

The Liljestrand House at 3300 Tantalus Drive in Honolulu, Hawaii, was designed by Vladimir Ossipoff for Dr. Howard and Betty Liljestrand, who had bought the hillside site overlooking downtown Oahu in 1948. Completed in 1952, the house "was perhaps Ossipoff's most intricate as well as his most widely publicized domestic commission." After it was featured in House Beautiful magazine as a Pace Setter House in 1958, it attracted hundreds of visitors in organized weekly tours. It was listed on the National Register of Historic Places in 2008.

The house is open to the public for regularly scheduled public tours, programs and events.

== Owners ==
Howard Liljestrand was the son of missionaries to Sichuan, China, where he had been raised. After completing medical degrees in the United States, he and Betty arrived in Hawaiʻi in 1937 en route to China. However, the chaos that followed the outbreak of the Second Sino-Japanese War earlier that year convinced them to pause in Honolulu, where both found employment at The Queen's Medical Center. Eventually they decided to settle in the Islands, build a home, and raise a family.

It took the Liljestrands until 1946 to find the perfect spot: on a secluded hillside, but within easy reach of work, school, and town. Howard had enjoyed youthful summers in China at a mountain retreat, and he and Betty often roamed the wooded ridge christened Tantalus by Punahou School students. Other prime hillside communities near town were already crowded, but Tantalus was still sparsely settled forest reserve land, lacking city water lines, and the few lots available were not very expensive. During one of their hikes in 1946, Howard and Betty found the perfect spot—along with its elderly owner enjoying the view. After they became better acquainted, Mr. Coulter offered to sell them the parcel of land for $2000, even though they offered him twice the price. Then the couple went looking for the perfect architect to build a home for them on that site, and found him in Vladimir Ossipoff.

== House ==
The Liljestrands presented Ossipoff with demanding requirements, while the topography and highly variable daily weather conditions—sun, wind, and rain—imposed further constraints. The house is on two terraces, with the carport, entrance, and main part of the long, narrow house on the uphill terrace, and a lower story opening onto the downhill terrace. On a third, lower tier is a swimming pool. The upper side of the house is well sheltered from frequent mountain showers, while low-lying wooden louvers draw cooling breezes toward the larger openings on the side facing downhill. A long, open-sided recreation room extends beneath the bedrooms and faces onto a wide lawn. The large master bedroom at one end is angled to preserve an old stand of eucalyptus trees, and a sharp, wraparound deck juts out from the living room end of the house, overlooking the pool, the treetops, and a wide expanse of the city and the leeward side of the island stretching into the distance. Every room has a view.

The house is made of wood frame with retaining walls of concrete block in support. Large glass windows under overhanging eaves combine with carefully placed partitions to provide both shade and filtered daylight. Interior walls of redwood are bleach-stained to mute the color and highlight the grain. The staircase, built-in cabinets, countertops, and several pieces of furniture were fashioned from the fine wood of a single, large monkeypod tree. The open-beamed ceiling adds to the spaciousness of the living rooms, while a sandstone fireplace with copper hood lends a simultaneous feel of coziness.

The exterior landscaping was designed by the noted landscape architects, Robert and Catherine Thompson, who were friends of the family.

== Liljestrand Foundation ==
The mission of the Liljestrand Foundation is to preserve and share Liljestrand House - a defining work of Hawaii architect Vladimir Ossipoff - and foster dialogue on imaginative design.

Upon Howard Liljestrand’s death in 2004, his four children inherited Liljestrand House. The Liljestrand Foundation was created by the Liljestrand family in 2007 with the vision of preserving Liljestrand House, its site and archives, and making that preservation beneficial to the public. Ownership of Liljestrand House was transferred to the foundation in December 2015. The family retained no ownership of the property, the house or the contents. Bob Liljestrand was the eldest son of Howard and Betty Liljestrand and served as president and founding director of the foundation until his death in 2021. Bob's son Shan Liljestrand currently serves as president of the foundation.

Preservation of the house is made possible through donations, public tours, and program revenues.

== Photo gallery ==
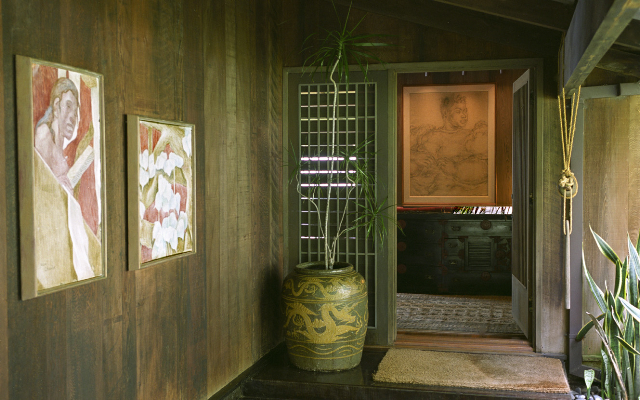
Front entrance, with Madge Tennent painting inside and Jean Charlot murals framed outside

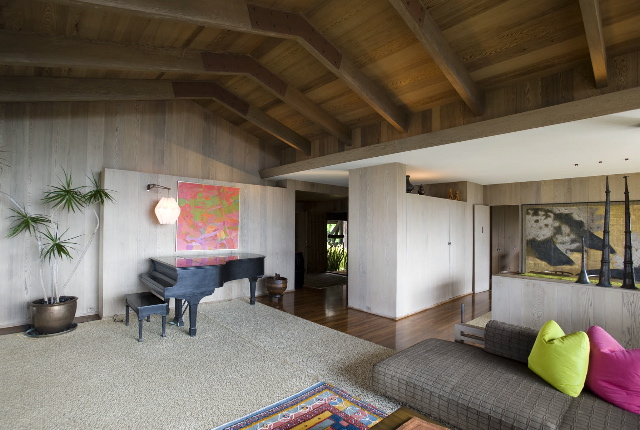
Living room, facing front entrance

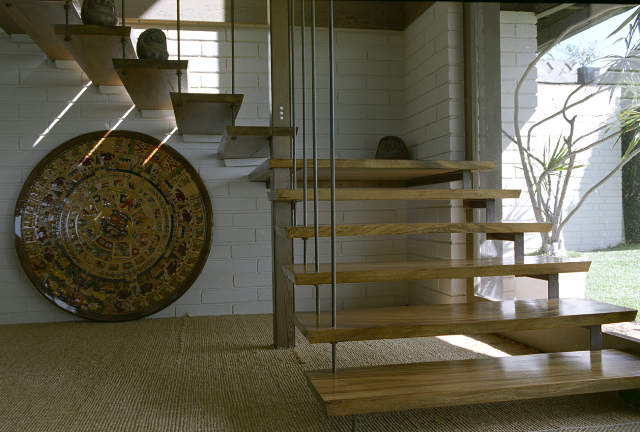
Stairway up to living room

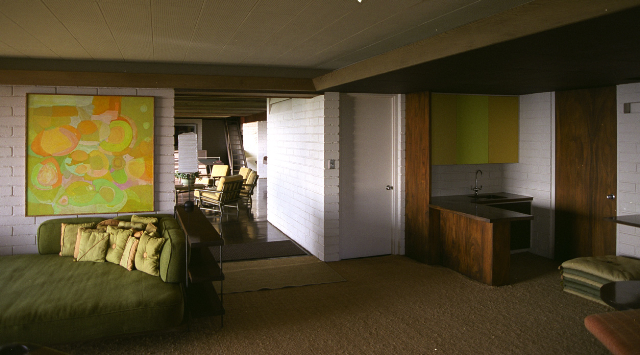
Downstairs, facing pavilion (open-sided recreation room)

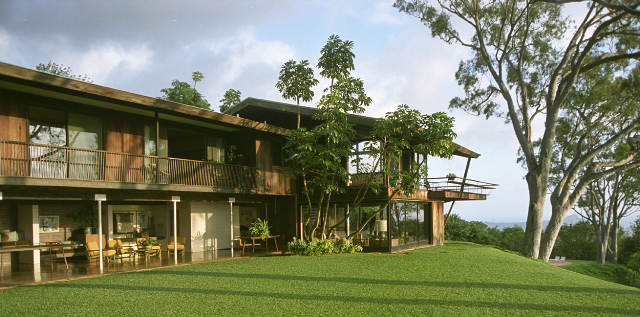
Makai (seaside) elevation, from lawn

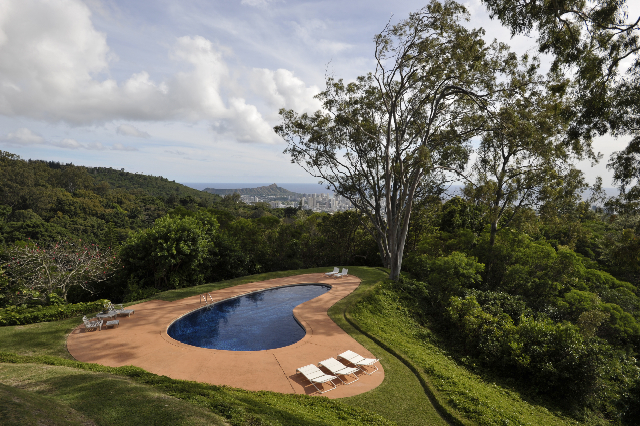
View over pool, with Diamond Head in distance

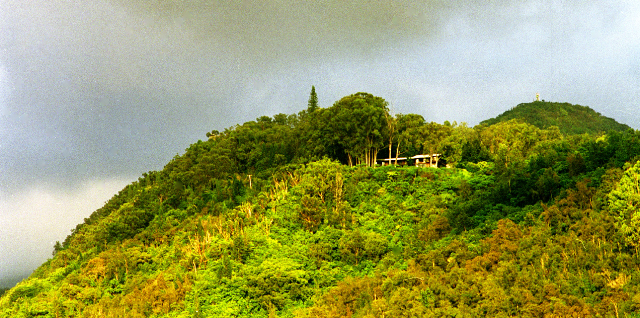
View from far below
