= Museum of Modern Art, Rio de Janeiro =

Museum of Modern Art of Rio de Janeiro
- Museu de Arte Moderna do Rio de Janeiro

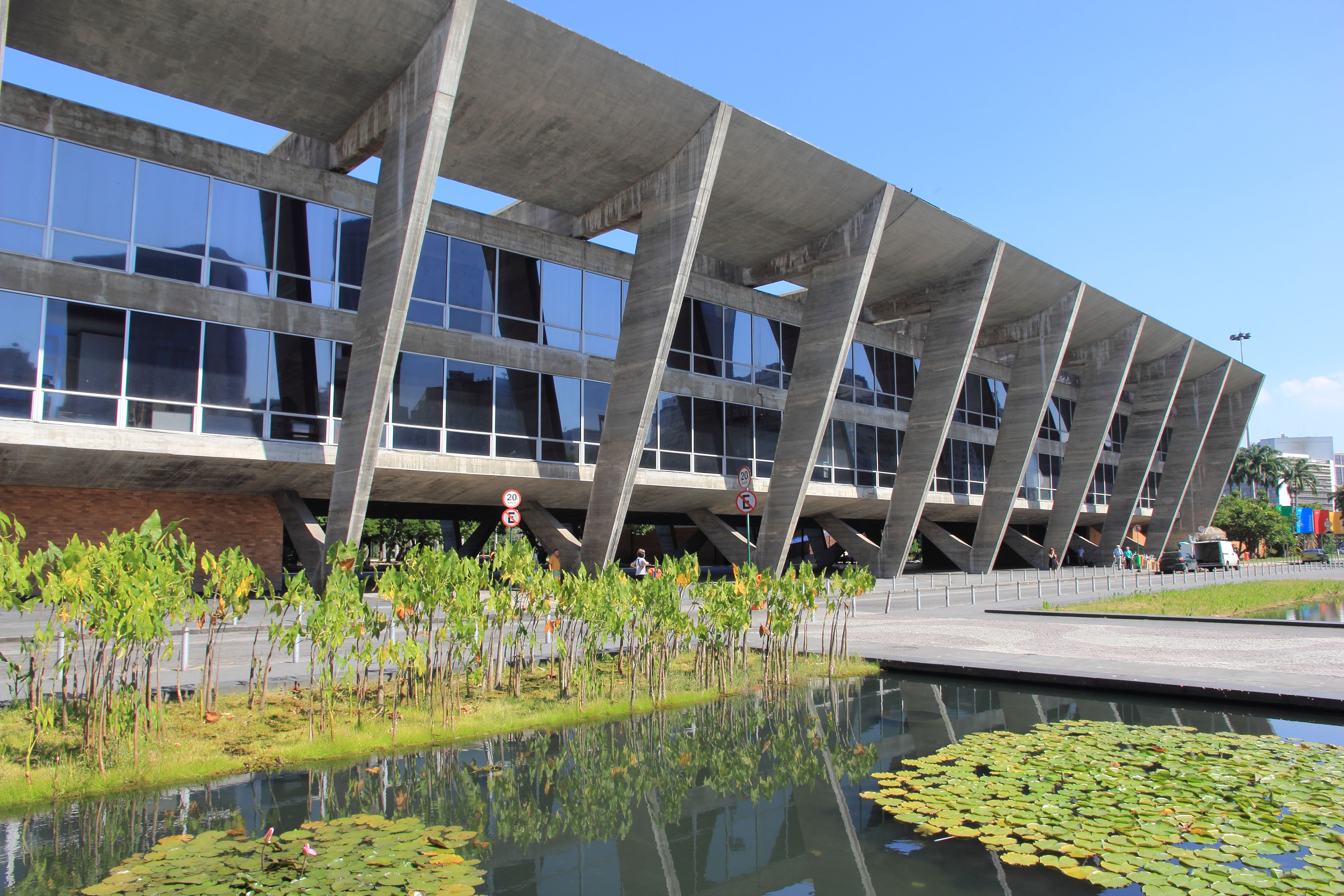
- The museum in 2013

- Location of Museum of Modern Art in Rio de Janeiro
- Established: 1948
- Location: Rio de Janeiro, Brazil
- Coordinates: 22.913375°S 43.171980°W
- Type: Art museum
- Visitors: 250,000 (2012)
- Director: Fabio Szwarcwald
- Curator: Fernando Cocchiarale
- Architect: Affonso Eduardo Reidy
- Website: mam.rio

The Museum of Modern Art of Rio de Janeiro (Portuguese: Museu de Arte Moderna do Rio de Janeiro, MAM) is a museum located in northeastern Flamengo Park, in the city of Rio de Janeiro, Brazil. It is in the Centro district, west of Santos Dumont Airport, on Guanabara Bay.

== Architecture ==
Flamengo Park was an urban planning project on the coast of Rio under the direction of Roberto Burle Marx (1909-1994) in the 1950s and 1960s. The Modernist concrete museum building, designed by Affonso Eduardo Reidy (1909-1964) with his partner Carmen Portinho serving as chief engineer, was completed in 1955. The museum's landmark Modernist gardens were designed by Burle Marx.

The main building has a dramatic cadence of external pillar elements, connected by longitudinal beams, providing a galley level free of internal columns or structural walls. The park was created on landfill in the bay, so the pillars footings reach 20 metres (66 ft) down.

A large outdoor terrace is framed by the entrance façades of the main building and theater wing. The northern façade has aluminum shutters to control the amount of (low) natural light entering the gallery space during the winter solstice period. The windows of the gallery are oriented to the north and south.

An inner courtyard was also designed by Burle Marx. A broad spiral ramp element reaches an upper level, with a roof terrace, restaurant, bar, and lounge overlooking Guanabara Bay, Sugarloaf, and Rio's other granitic mountain formations.

== Scope ==
Affonso Eduardo Reidy's essay for the meaning of the museum expressed:

The cultural influence of a modern art museum is not only drawn from the collection of works of art and of courses of study and conferences held there, but more particularly the creation of their own intellectual atmosphere in which the artist is to enrich their own work and ideas in which the public can absorb the artistic culture required by the mind of modern man.

The museum's scope is as an arts center, and includes:

1. exhibitions — galleries for the permanent collection and travelling shows.
2. school of art — with lecture and studio spaces.
3. theater — for concerts, plays, classical ballets, film exhibitions, and conferences.
4. operations — public services (dining, etc.), workshops, collections warehouses, administration offices and bookstore.

== 1978 fire ==
On July 8, 1978, a fire caused either by a cigarette or an electrical failure destroyed 90% of the museum's collection, including artworks from Pablo Picasso ("Cubist Head" and "Portrait of Dora Maar"), Joan Miró ("Persons in a Landscape"), Salvador Dalí ("Egg on a Plate, Without the Plate"), Max Ernst, Paul Klee, Diego Rivera, René Magritte, Louis Van Lint, Ivan Serpa, David Alfaro Siqueiros, Manabu Mabe and others – and all artworks showed in a big retrospective of artist Joaquín Torres-García.

== 2024 G20 Conference ==
The Museum of Modern Art was the location of the 2024 G20 Summit, an annual gathering of the leaders of the world's twenty largest economies.

== See also ==
- Ministry of Education and Health Building (Gustavo Capanema Palace), Rio de Janeiro — Affonso Eduardo Reidy part of architectural team.
