= Affonso Eduardo Reidy =

Brazilian architect

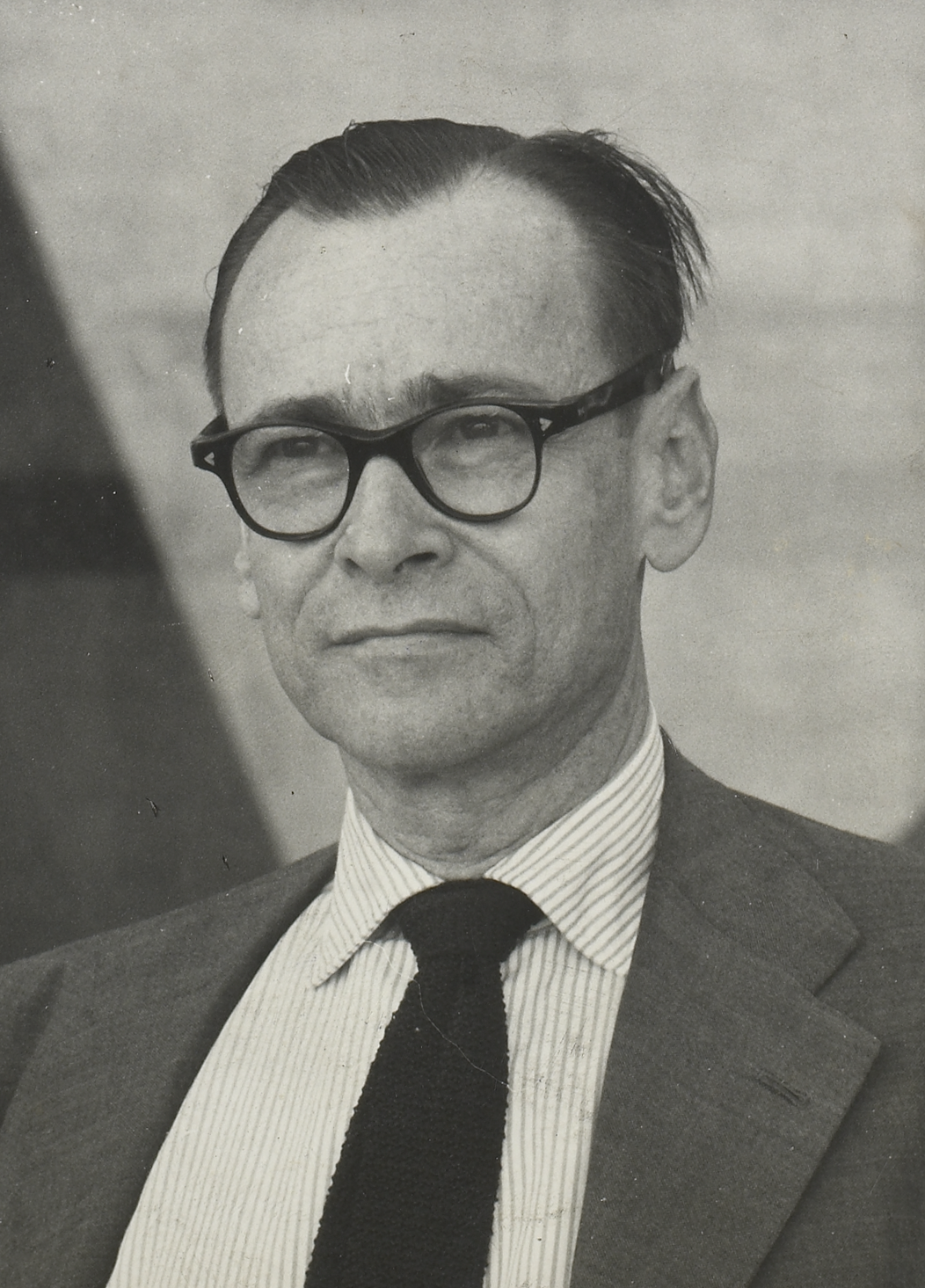
- Born: 26 October 1909; Paris, France
- Died: 10 August 1964 (aged 54); Rio de Janeiro, Brazil
- Occupation: Architect
- Spouse: Carmen Portinho
- Practice: Affonso Reidy
- Buildings: Museum of Modern Art, Rio de Janeiro, 1954-1960 (destroyed by fire, 1978; reconstructed by Henrique Mindlin).
- Projects: Pedregulho Housing Development, Rio de Janeiro. 1947-1955; Ministry of Education and Health, Rio de Janeiro. 1936+ with Lucio Costa, Oscar Niemeyer, Jorge Moreira, Ernani Vasconcelos and Carlos Leao; Le Corbusier, Consultant.

Affonso Eduardo Reidy (26 October 1909–10 August 1964) was a Brazilian architect. He was the son of an English father and a Brazilian mother. Reidy entered the Escola Nacional de Belas Artes in Rio de Janeiro at age 17. He apprenticed with the French urban planner Alfred Agache (1875–1959) during his studies. Reidy graduated and became an architect in 1930. Lúcio Costa appointed him as a teaching assistant to the architect Gregori Warchavchik (1896–1972) at the Escola Nacional de Belas Artes in the same year.

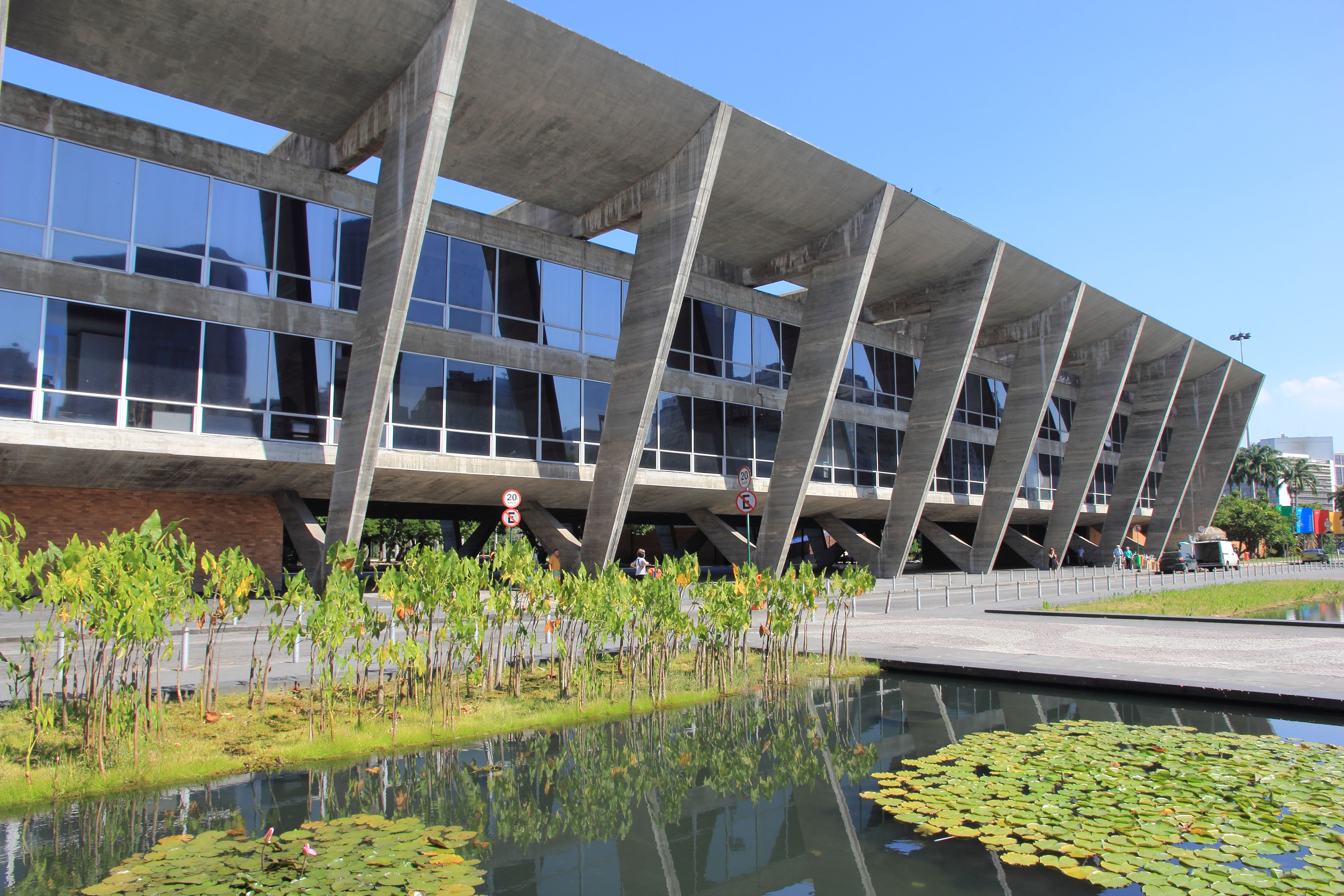
MAM—Museum of Modern Art, Rio de Janeiro.

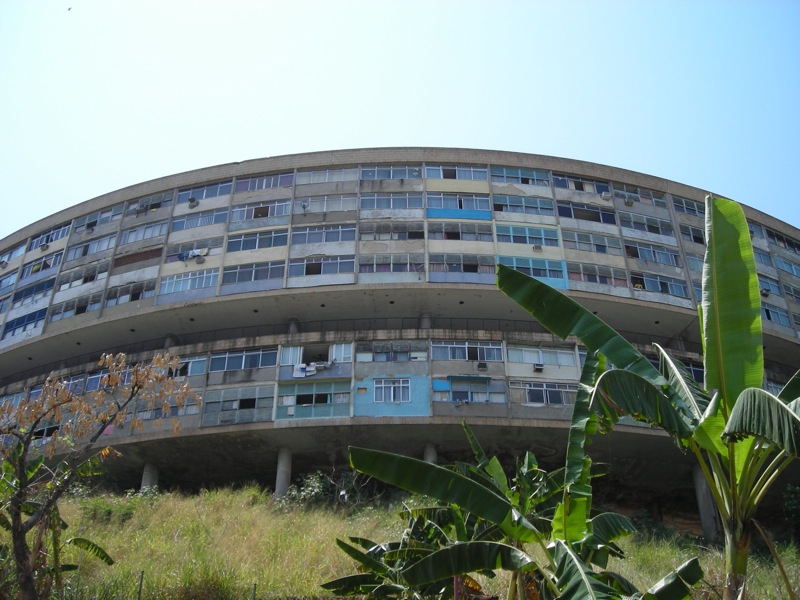
Pedregulho Housing Development, Benfica neighborhood of Rio de Janeiro.

== Projects ==
Projects by Affonso Reidy include:

- Pedregulho Housing Complex — Benfica neighborhood of Rio de Janeiro.
- Museum of Modern Art, Rio de Janeiro — landscape design by Roberto Burle Marx.
- Carmen Miranda Museum - located in the Parque Brigadeiro Eduardo Gomes (Flamengo Park)
- Ministry of Education and Health Building (Gustavo Capanema Palace, Rio de Janeiro) — with Lucio Costa, Oscar Niemeyer, Jorge Moreira, Ernani Vasconcelos. and Carlos Leao.

== See also ==
- Brazilian architects
- Modernist architecture in Brazil
