= Cypress Ranch High School =

Public school in Texas, United States

Location
- 10700 Fry Road; Cypress, TX 77433; United States; 29.9397°N 95.7195°W

Information
- Type: Public high school
- Established: 2008
- School district: Cypress-Fairbanks Independent School District
- NCES District ID: 4816110
- CEEB code: 441689
- Principal: Michael Maness
- Teaching staff: 216.69 FTE (2023-2024)
- Grades: 9-12
- Enrollment: 3,498 (2023-2024)
- Student to teacher ratio: 16.14 (2023-2024)
- Colors: Navy blue & gold
- Athletics: UIL 6A
- Athletics conference: University Interscholastic League
- Team name: Mustangs
- Website: cyranch.cfisd.net

Cypress Ranch High School is a secondary school located in Cypress, which is an unincorporated area in Harris County, Texas, near Houston. It is a part of the Cypress-Fairbanks Independent School District.

== History ==
Building and opening of the school

Trustees approved of the construction contract for Cypress Ranch High School and Warner Elementary, located on the 130 acre multi-campus site at Fry Road and Cypress North Houston, to Pepper-Lawson Construction, L.P. in the amount of $68,673,095.00. Both Cypress Ranch and Cypress Lakes High School were designed by PBK Architects, Inc. with modifications to existing plans used in the construction of Cypress Ridge High School, Cypress Woods High School, and Cypress Springs High School. Finally, Cypress Ranch opened for the 2008–2009 school year.

Viral anti-bullying video and South Park's spoof of anti-bullying video

On March 29, 2012, Cypress Ranch High School released a lip dub video on YouTube called "Who Do U Think U R." for their anti-bullying campaign and to compete in the Great American No Bull Challenge video contest. According to the video's YouTube page, the entire project was created by Cypress Ranch students. More than 1,000 students participated in the project. The video was parodied in the Comedy Central animated series, South Park, in the 2012 episode, Butterballs.

== Demographics ==
The demographic breakdown of the students enrolled for 2025-26 was:

- African American: 18.75%
- Hispanic: 25.91%
- White: 26.87%
- Native American: 0.29%
- Asian: 23.83%
- Pacific Islander: 0.12%
- Two or More Races: 4.23%

Out of all of the students attending the school, 26.03% are eligible for free or reduced meals.

== Sports teams ==
- Baseball: won state championship in 2012 and 2015.
- Football: AAAAAA D1 Football Finalist in 2014
- Further Records and Statistics

== Notable alumni ==
- Shemar Bartholomew - NFL cornerback for the Indianapolis Colts
- Danielle Bradbery - country singer and winner of NBC's The Voice
- Colton Cowser - outfielder for the Baltimore Orioles
- Drake Dabney - NFL tight end for the Green Bay Packers
- Keith Ford - Former NFL running back
- JJ Goss - pitcher for the Tampa Bay Rays
- Bryce Johnson - Outfielder for the San Diego Padres
- Ty Madden - Pitcher for the Detroit Tigers
- Corbin Martin - Pitcher for the Arizona Diamondbacks
- DiDi Richards - Professional basketball player for the New York Liberty
