= Ryan Fodje =

American football player (born 2007)

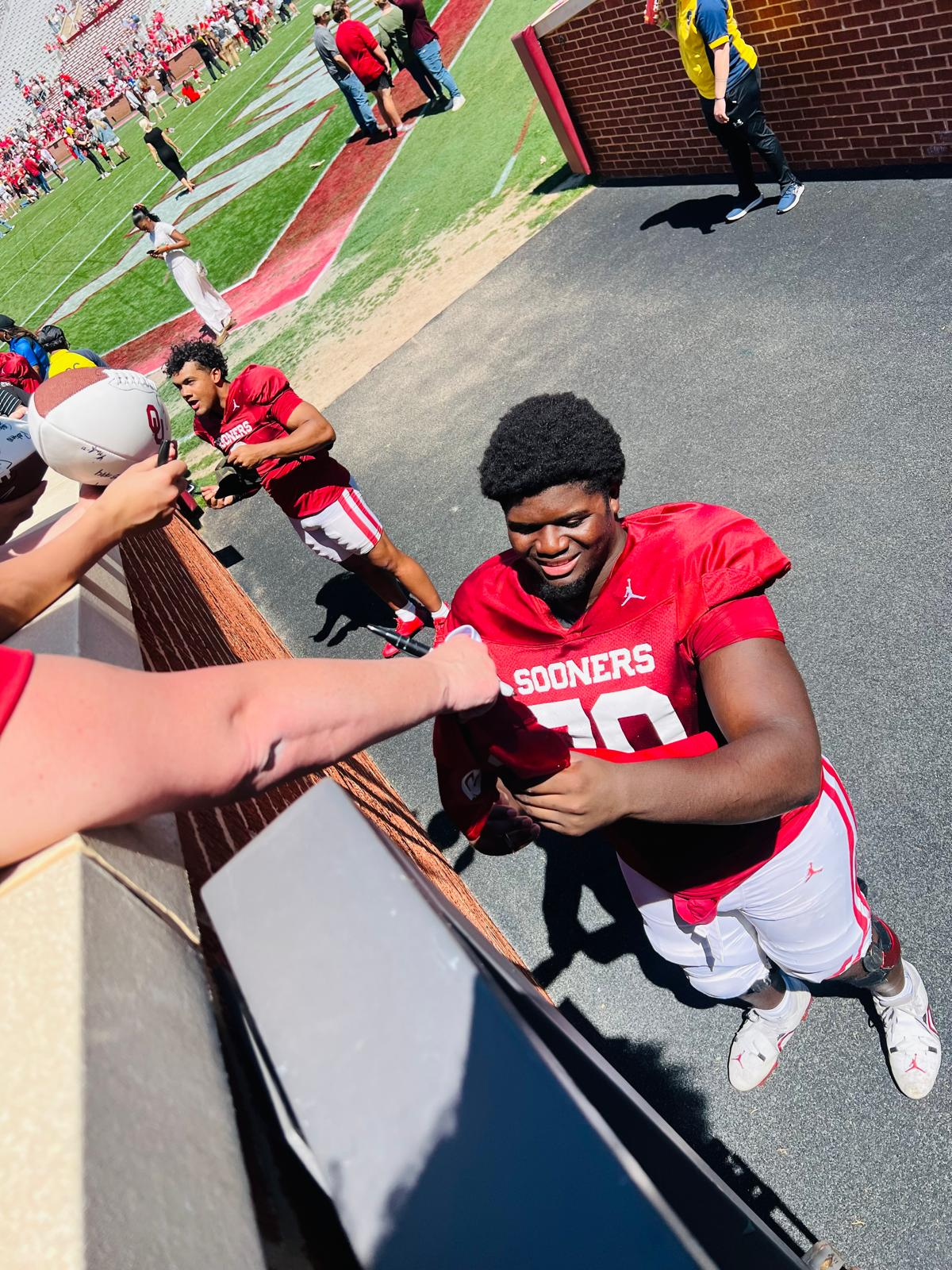
- Fodje during his freshman season at Oklahoma.

No. 70 – Oklahoma Sooners
- Position: Offensive lineman

Personal information
- Born: 2007 (age 18–19)
- Listed height: 6 ft 5 in (1.96 m)
- Listed weight: 322 lb (146 kg)

Ryan Fodje (born c. 2007) is an American college football offensive lineman for the Oklahoma Sooners. A consensus four-star recruit from high school, he is noted for his rapid development in the sport, which he began playing only upon entering high school.

== Early life and high school career ==
Fodje grew up in Cypress, Texas, and attended Bridgeland High School (Bridgeland HS). He is a latecomer to the sport of football, stating he "didn't even know what football was" when he started playing as a freshman. He spent countless hours learning the game and quickly developed into one of the top offensive line prospects in the nation.

During his junior season (2023), he was a first-team selection for District 16-6A, helping lead Bridgeland High School to a 9–2 record and an appearance in the Texas 6A D-I playoffs. He also competed in track and field for Bridgeland, where he throws the shot put, with a recorded mark of 45 feet, 5.75 inches (13.86 m).

As a consensus four-star prospect in the Class of 2025, Fodje was rated as a top-100 recruit nationally by multiple scouting services, including On3 (No. 68) and 247Sports (No. 70). He was named a finalist for Dave Campbell's Texas Football 2024 Whataburger Super Team and was selected to the 2025 Navy All-American Bowl. He committed to the University of Oklahoma on February 4, 2024, choosing the Sooners over offers from programs including Texas, Oregon, and Tennessee.

== College career ==
Fodje officially signed with the Oklahoma Sooners on December 4, 2024, and enrolled at the university in January 2025. He has played in all four of Oklahoma's games in the 2025 season. The coaching staff has credited him for his dedication and "doing things right over and over," with the expectation that he would contribute immediately to the offensive line.

=== 2025 season ===
Fodje saw rotational action in early games against Temple and Kent State. On October 26, 2025, Fodje made his first career start at right tackle against the No. 8 ranked Ole Miss. He played all 67 offensive snaps in the contest after injuries to veteran lineman Derek Simmons forced a shift in the starting unit.

== Statistics ==
The following table reflects Fodje's game-by-game participation and performance grades during his freshman season at Oklahoma, as measured by Pro Football Focus (PFF).

2025 Regular Season Game Log
Opponent	Position	Snaps	Overall Grade	Notable Result
Illinois State	RG	56	62.4	Majority of game played at right guard
Temple	RG/RT	22	59.8	Rotation at tackle and guard
Kent State	RG	24	60.1	Second-highest snaps for reserve OL
Ole Miss	RT	67	56.6	First Career Start (Tackle)
Tennessee	RT	66	48.3	Second start; faced top-10 pass rush
Alabama	RG	40	65.7	Key reserve during third-down packages
LSU	RG	68	63.0	Started final 2025 regular season game
Total	—	357	61.2	(2025 Regular Season totals)
