= Bridgeland Community, Texas =

Unincorporated community in Harris County, Texas

Bridgeland, Texas
Project
- Construction started: October 2003
- Completed: 2037 (est.)
- Opening date: 2006
- Status: In progress
- Size: 11,500 acres (4,700 ha)
- Developer: Howard Hughes Holdings Inc.
- Architect: Clark Condon; Kirksey; Lake Flato; Studio RED
- Website: bridgeland.com

Physical features
- Major buildings: 20,000 homes
- Public spaces: Parks, lakes, hiking trails
- Divisions: Lakeland Village; Creekland Village; Prairieland Village; Parkland Village

Location
- Interactive map of Bridgeland Community, Texas
- Coordinates: 29.95663°N 95.73227°W
- Country: United States
- State: Texas
- County: Harris
- Location: Houston, Texas

Area
  - Total: 11,500 acres (4,700 ha)

Population (2019)
  - Total: 11,000

Bridgeland is a planned community near Houston, Texas, built by Howard Hughes Holdings.

Bridgeland is an 11,500-acre (47 km^{2}) master-planned community to the northwest of Houston in Harris County, between U.S. Route 290 and Interstate 10. Bisecting Bridgeland is Segment E of the Grand Parkway, a 15.2-mile thoroughfare for which construction broke ground in 2011 and opened in December 2013.

Planned for 20,000 homes and approximately 70,000 residents, Bridgeland is developed by Howard Hughes Holdings Inc., which also develops The Woodlands and The Woodlands Hills master planned communities in the Greater Houston area; Seaport District in New York City; Downtown Columbia in Maryland; Summerlin in Las Vegas; Ward Village in Honolulu, Hawaii; and Teravalis in the Greater Phoenix, Arizona, area.

== History ==
In the mid-1800s, European settlers began to establish small farms within the Katy Prairie and where Bridgeland now sits, growing corn, potatoes, cotton and raising cattle. During the 1940s, and through the next two decades, the land was primarily used for rice farming. After rice production ceased, the fields were converted to improved pastures to provide foraging areas for cattle. Approximately 10,167 acres were purchased for development in 2003 and sales of new homes in Bridgeland began in 2006. In 2007 General Growth Properties (GGP) purchased an additional 1,234 acres of land from the Texas General Land Office. Over the course of development, additional parcels of land were acquired bringing the community's total acreage to 11,500. In 2009 during the economic downturn, GGP filed for bankruptcy but did not include its master planned communities of The Woodlands and Bridgeland in that filing. The Howard Hughes Corporation was spun off from GGP and in 2011 acquired majority interest in both development projects, which it now manages, as well as others in its portfolio.

== Geography ==
Bridgeland consists of 11,500 acres of mostly flat to gently rolling terrain in northwest Harris County. It is located on and along the eastern margins of the Katy Prairie spanning two watersheds. The property's northern boundary abuts the Cypress Creek corridor and to the south, Langham Creek. Other existing natural and constructed features include Mallard Lake and Ramey Lake, Longenbaugh Pond and the K-150 Canal now known as Josey Lake.

== Education ==
Students living in Bridgeland's Lakeland Village and those in Parkland Village attend schools in the Cypress-Fairbanks Independent School District (CFISD). Children living in Prairieland and Creekland Villages will be zoned to Waller ISD with a small section of Prairieland Village zoned to both Cy-Fair ISD and Katy ISD.

=== Cypress-Fairbanks Independent School District ===
- Margie Sue Pope Elementary School, Jim and Pam Wells Elementary School, and Sue McMichael McGown Elementary School
- Sprague Middle School
- Bridgeland High School

Pope Elementary School is in The Cove subdivision. It was named after a longtime CFISD teacher. It opened in August 2013 as the first of nine on-site schools planned.

Jim and Pam Wells Elementary School, another elementary school in Bridgeland, opened in 2017. Jim and Pam Wells were also longtime CFISD teachers and employees.

=== Waller Independent School District ===
- Richard T. McReavy Elementary School, located in Prairieland Village, was the first Waller ISD elementary school to be established in the Bridgeland complex. Its operations began in August 2024. It is the zoned school of this area.
- Zoned junior high school: Waller Junior High School
- Waller High School is the zoned high school for all of Waller ISD

=== Colleges ===
- Lone Star College is the designated community college for residents of Cy-Fair ISD. Blinn College is the designated community college for residents of Waller ISD.

=== Histories of schools ===
In the beginning residents were zoned to Robison Elementary School, Spillane Middle School, and Cypress Woods High School.

Residents were at one point rezoned to Warner Elementary School, and Cypress Ranch High School. In 2017, the entire development was to be rezoned to Bridgeland High School.

=== Other school districts ===
Future phases of Bridgeland will be served by Katy Independent School District and the Waller Independent School District.

=== Schools ===
- Pope Elementary School
- Bridgeland High School
- Roy J. Sprague Jr. Middle School
- Wells Elementary
- Sue McGown Elementary School
- Waller ISD elementary school

=== Private Schools ===
The first private school, Cypress Christian School, purchased 40 acres of land in 2021 to move their K-12 campus to Prairieland Village. The school will serve 1,000 students and is slated to open for the 2025-2026 school year. The community's first charter school, Harmony Public Schools, purchased a 28-acre parcel of land in Creekland Village in August 2022. The school will serve 450 students from pre-kindergarten to second and sixth grades in the first phase of development, which is slated to open ahead of the 2025-2026 school year. A future phase will include a second building for middle and high school classes that is slated for opening for the 2026-2027 school year. Students living in the Greater Houston area meeting requirements are eligible to attend.

== Villages ==
Bridgeland's master plan consists of four distinct villages: Lakeland Village, Creekland Village, Prairieland Village and Parkland Village. Each village will have clusters of neighborhoods anchored by a village center. The Bridgeland Town Center is a centralized location between the villages for businesses and amenities.

== Recreation ==
Bridgeland's master plan details 3,000 acres of open space, including 900 acres of lakes. Three of four planned recreation complexes are open, with one in each village: Lakeland Activity Center, Dragonfly Park and Activity Center and Longwing Landing.

More than 250 miles of trails are planned for the community, with many miles already open, including the first phase of Cypress Creek Nature Trail, a wooded trail in the Cypress Creek corridor that has educational signage and wildlife observation areas.
