= Cypress Woods High School =

Public school in Texas, United States

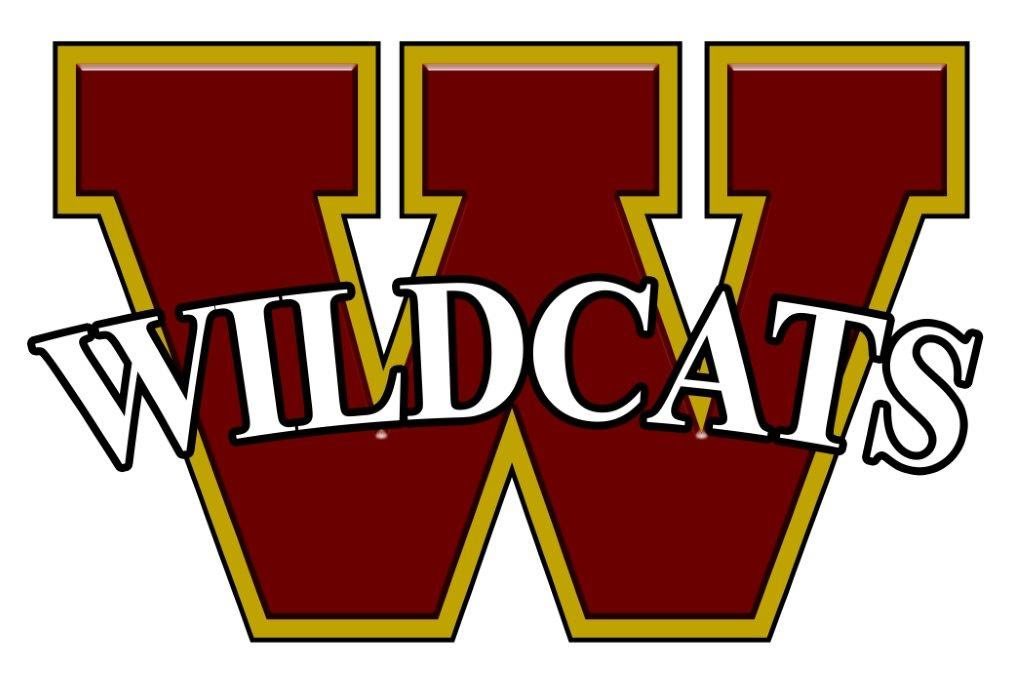

Location
- 13550 Woods Spillane Blvd; Cypress, Texas 77429; United States; 29.9707°N 95.6819°W

Information
- Type: Public high school
- Motto: 212°
- Established: 2006
- School district: Cypress-Fairbanks Independent School District
- Principal: Lloyd Turner
- Teaching staff: 220.13 FTE
- Grades: 9–12
- Enrollment: 3,391 (2023–2024)
- Student to teacher ratio: 15.40
- Colors: Crimson Red and Gold
- Athletics: UIL 6A
- Athletics conference: University Interscholastic League
- Team name: Wildcats
- Newspaper: The Crimson Connection
- Yearbook: The Crimson
- Website: Cypress Woods High School website

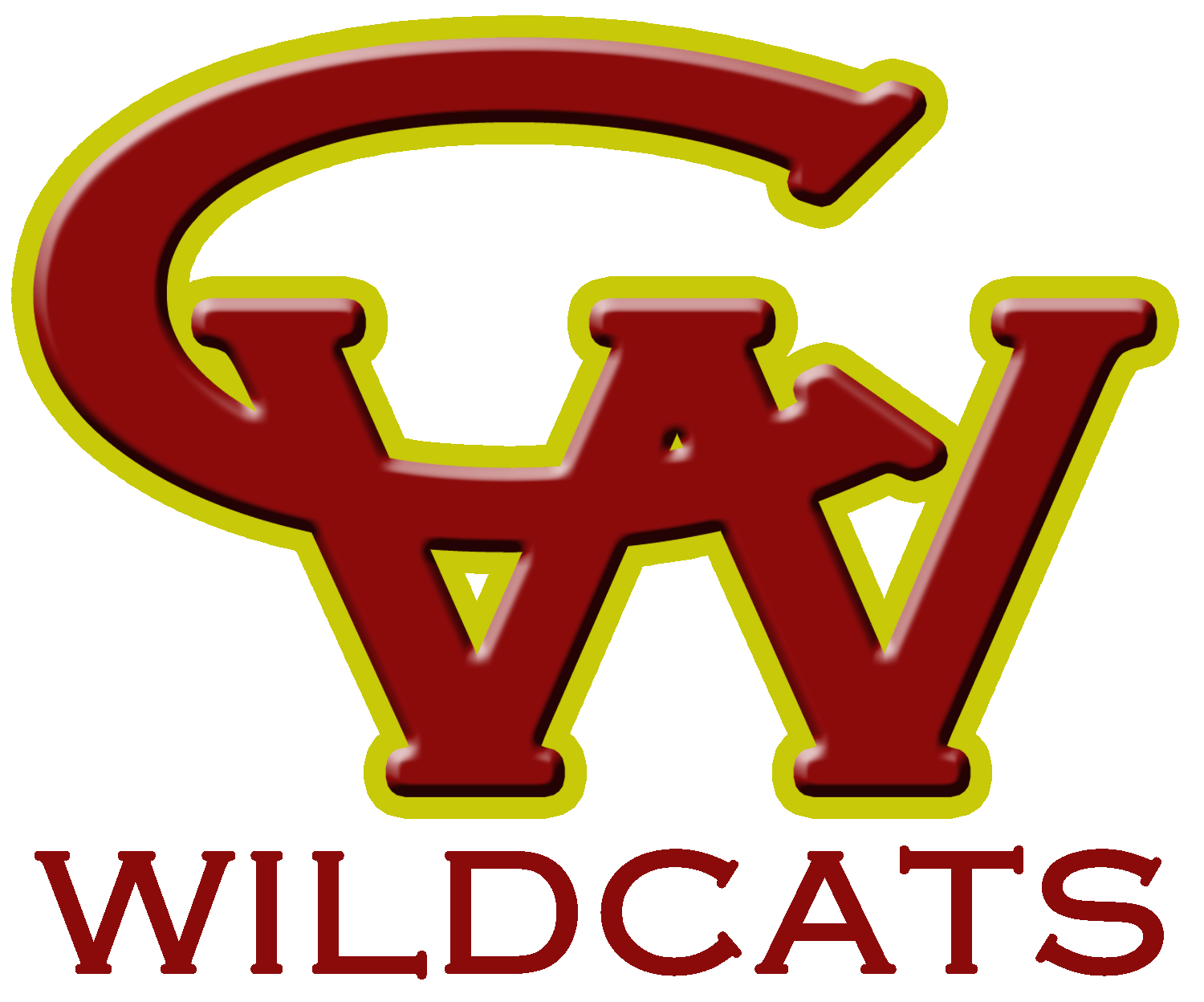

Cypress Woods High School, commonly known as Cy Woods, is a secondary school located in Cypress, which is an unincorporated area of Harris County, Texas, United States, near Houston.

Since the start of the 2023-2024 School Year, the principal of Cypress Woods is Lloyd Turner, who was the principal for Aragon Middle School. The school mascot is the Wildcat.

== History ==
Cypress Woods, announced in 2005 as Cypress-Fairbanks Independent School District High School #8, is part of the Cypress-Fairbanks Independent School District. The school opened in the fall of 2006 due to rapid growth of CFISD. The 504,626-square-foot (46,881.3 m^{2}) campus was built at a cost of 50.9 million United States dollars by Pepper-Lawson Incorporated on a 182-acre (0.74 km^{2}) site. The campus was designed by PBK. CWHS relieved Cy-Fair High School and Cypress Falls High School.

The first graduating class was the Class of 2009. About 140 staff members (including 100 teachers) served about 2,100 students when Cypress Woods opened.

The first group of students joined the administration in selecting the school's mascot, Wildcats, prior to the school's opening. The board of trustees approved crimson red and gold as the school's colors.

== Campus ==
The Campus layout was the third of five CFISD High Schools to use a similar layout, reminiscent of a mall, with Cy-Springs and Cy-Ridge opening before in 1997 and 2002, respectfully, and Cy-Lakes, and Cy-Ranch opening after in 2008.

The school shares a campus with Robison Elementary School and Spillane Middle School; this campus takes up 182 acres (74 ha) of space. The Carlton Center is connected to the high school building and provides pre-vocational programs for students with disabilities. The school participates in a variety of varsity level sports at the 6A level and club level. The 6A sports include: baseball; basketball; cross country; football; golf; soccer; softball; tennis; swimming and diving; track and field; volleyball; wrestling; and water polo. The club sports include: bowling; fishing; ice hockey; and lacrosse.

== Academics ==
For the 2018–19 school year, the school received an A grade from the Texas Education Agency, with an overall score of 94 out of 100. The school received an A grade in each of the three performance domains, with a score of 95 for Student Achievement, 91 for School Progress, and 92 for Closing the Gaps. The school received five of the seven possible distinction designations for Academic Achievement in Mathematics, Academic Achievement in Social Studies, Top 25%: Comparative Academic Growth, Post-Secondary Readiness, and Top 25%: Comparative Closing the Gaps. The school did not receive distinction designations for Academic Achievement in Science or Academic Achievement in English Language Arts/Reading. In 2019, the school was the overall champion of the UIL state academic meet, with 105.5 points in total.

== Demographics ==
The demographic breakdown of the 3,320 students enrolled for 2019–20 was:

- African American: 10.6%
- Hispanic: 30.0%
- White: 49.4%
- American Indian: 0.4%
- Asian: 10.9%
- Pacific Islander: 0.1%
- Two or More Races: 2.7%

21.6% of the students were eligible for free or reduced-cost lunch.

== Feeder patterns ==
Schools that feed into Cypress Woods include:

- Elementary schools: Farney, Robison, Sampson, Black (partial), Keith (partial), Ault (partial)
- Middle schools: Goodson, Spillane (partial), Salyards (Partial)

== Notable alumni ==
- Cammile Adams (2010), Olympic athlete
- Bryce Callahan (2010), cornerback for the Denver Broncos
- Jared Lakind (2010), American-Israeli professional baseball pitcher
- Ryan Hendrix (2013), MLB pitcher
- Chase McLaughlin (2014), placekicker for the Cleveland Browns
- Erica Ogwumike (2015), former college basketball player for the Rice Owls
- Christian Jones (2018), college football offensive lineman for the Texas Longhorns
- Munzer Kabbara (2021), Olympic swimmer
- Nancy Mulkey (2016), My Giant Life star
