= IEO =

IEO may refer to:

- Independent Evaluation Office, of the World Bank
- International Economics Olympiad, an International Science Olympiad
- International English Olympiad, a competition conducted by the Science Olympiad Foundation
- Istituto Europeo di Oncologia, the European Institute of Oncology
- Interior-Earth object or Atira asteroid
- Institut d'Estudis Occitans (Institute of Western Studies), a cultural organization
- Initial exchange offering
