= Bridgeland High School =

Public school in Texas, United States

Location
- 10707 Mason Road; Cypress, Texas 77433; United States; 29.9315°N 95.7590°W

Information
- Type: Public high school
- Motto: "Win the Day!"
- Established: 2017
- School district: Cypress-Fairbanks Independent School District
- NCES District ID: 4816110
- Principal: Richard Dixon
- Faculty: 217.76 FTE
- Grades: 9-12
- Enrollment: 3,647 (2023–2024)
- Student to teacher ratio: 16.75
- Colors: Orange and navy
- Athletics: UIL 6A
- Athletics conference: University Interscholastic League
- Team name: Bears
- Newspaper: The Bridge
- Yearbook: Kodiak
- Website: bridgeland.cfisd.net

Bridgeland High School is a high school in the Bridgeland community in unincorporated Harris County, Texas, in the Houston metropolitan area. It is part of the Cypress-Fairbanks Independent School District (CFISD).

== History ==
Michael Smith was the first principal of Bridgeland High School. Before Bridgeland opened, he was the principal of Cy-Fair High School.

The opening relieved Cypress Ranch High School.

== Campus ==
Bridgeland High School is located near Texas State Highway 99 (Grand Parkway), off of Mason Road. It has a four-story academic wing, which is the first of its kind in the district.

Bridgeland is a part of an "Educational Village", a multi-campus site that includes Wells Elementary and Sprague middle school. The high school will be the tallest structure in the complex.

== Academics ==
For the 2018–2019 school year, the school received an A grade from the Texas Education Agency, with an overall score of 95 out of 100. The school received an A grade in two domains, Student Achievement (score of 94) and Closing the Gaps (score of 96), and a B grade for School Progress (score of 83). The school received four of the seven possible distinction designations for Academic Achievement in English Language Arts/Reading, Academic Achievement in Social Studies, Post-Secondary Readiness, and Top 25%: Comparative Closing the Gaps.

== Demographics ==
The demographic breakdown of the 3,543 students enrolled for 2020–21 was:

- African American: 11.4%
- Hispanic: 21.1%
- White: 52.8%
- Native American: 0.5%
- Asian: 9.1%
- Pacific Islander: 0.2%
- Two or More Races: 3.9%

14.7% of the students were eligible for free or reduced-cost lunch.

== Feeder patterns ==
Schools that feed into Bridgeland include:

- Elementary schools: McGown, Swenke, Wells, Ault (partial), Keith (partial), Pope (partial),
- Middle schools: Sprague, Salyards (partial)

== Notable alumni ==
- Conner Weigman (2022) – college football player for the Texas A&M Aggies and the Houston Cougars.
