= Berry Center =

Berry Center may refer to:

- Berry Center of Northwest Houston, Cypress, Texas, United States
- Berry Events Center, Marquette, Michigan, United States
