= Windfern High School =

Location
- 12630 Windfern Road; Harris County (Houston address), Texas; United States; 29.934231°N 95.572801°W

Information
- Type: Public secondary
- Established: 1995
- School district: Cypress Fairbanks Independent School District
- Principal: Craig Pliskin
- Grades: N/A
- Enrollment: ~200
- Campus: Suburban
- Color: N/A
- Mascot: Lighthouse
- School hours: 7:15–4:45
- Website: Official Website

Windfern High School is a public secondary school located in unincorporated Harris County, Texas, United States.

Windfern High School, often referred to as The Lighthouse, is a campus of choice in the Cypress-Fairbanks Independent School District. Windfern's main campus focus is graduation leading to post-high school education and lifelong learning.

== History ==
The school opened in August 1995.

== Students ==
Windfern students generally fall between the ages of 17 and 21, and take anywhere from one to five classes per semester. A student typically transfers to Windfern because certain challenges have delayed them in the pursuit of the traditional path to graduation. The reasons for these delays are widely varied and are truly unique to each student, therefore, an application process is employed to select which students would most benefit.

A standard full Windfern course load is three two-hour classes.. It is also not uncommon for a student to take only the one or two classes needed to graduate. Some students may arrive in the afternoon for a class, or may just come in the mornings. There is not a fixed regimen to which all students must adhere.

== Campus ==
Windfern is located in the former Cypress-Fairbanks Independent School District Administration Building. Students utilize the parking lot of Pridgeon Stadium located directly adjacent to the school. Windfern is an open campus, meaning students are welcome to leave at certain times of the day. Classes start at 7:15 am and last until 4:45 pm. The majority of students, however, are in class between the hours of 8:10 and 2:30. Students are allowed one hour to eat lunch, which is usually eaten off campus because the former administration building offers limited food facilities.

== Graduation ==
Windfern holds two graduations per year. One in December, for the students completing all of their coursework in the fall semesters, and another in June for students finishing in the spring semesters. The staff at Windfern have recognized that there are no graduation speakers with a better message than the actual graduates who must audition for a spot on stage. Usually the top three speakers are chosen by a panel which consists of the campus administration and other staff.

== Feeder Patterns ==
Windfern is not fed by any specific middle or elementary schools because one must go through the application process before being accepted as a student. Windfern is a service campus for all of the other traditional, large campuses in the district.

== Controversy ==
In 2017, Windfern's principal expelled a student for refusing to stand during the Pledge of Allegiance. The student said that she did it because of "police brutality" and "Donald Trump being President." After a television station covered the story, the administration reversed its decision.
