= Cypress Lakes High School =

Public school in Texas, United States

Location
- 5750 Greenhouse Rd; Katy, TX 77449; United States
- 29.85361°N 95.70349°W

Information
- Type: Public high school
- Established: 2008
- School district: Cypress-Fairbanks Independent School District
- Principal: Lanette Bellamy
- Faculty: 217.09 FTE
- Grades: 9-12
- Enrollment: 3,256 (2023-2024)
- Student to teacher ratio: 15.00
- Colors: Red & Silver
- Athletics: UIL 6A
- Athletics conference: University Interscholastic League
- Team name: Spartans
- Website: cylakes.cfisd.net

Cypress Lakes High School is a secondary school located in an unincorporated area in Harris County, Texas, near Houston and with a Katy postal address. Cypress Lakes, originally named Cypress-Fairbanks Independent School District High School #10, is part of the Cypress-Fairbanks Independent School District and serves students in grades 9-12. It was built along with Cypress Ranch High School and opened in fall 2008. Cypress Lakes relieve the population of Cypress Falls High School, Cypress Springs High School, and Langham Creek High School.

== History ==
The district selected PBK Architects as the designer of the new school which uses similar blueprints to the existing Cypress Ridge, Cypress Springs, and Cypress Woods schools, following the design of a mall, that being of one main hallway becoming split into sub-hallways into the rooms. Originally the school was scheduled to open in fall 2009. The rapid growth in CFISD prompted the district to schedule the opening of the school in fall 2008. The first graduating class was the Class of 2011.

The school's first principal, Sarah Harty, was a former principal of Cypress Springs High School; she moved from Cy Springs to Cy Lakes upon the opening of the latter.

On March 28, 2014, former Houston Rockets center Dwight Howard visited the students at Cypress Lakes High School for winning the "Block Out Violence" program.

In 2016 Cypress Park High School opened, taking territory from the attendance zone of Cypress Lakes. In turn Cypress Lakes's attendance boundary took an area formerly in the boundary of Cypress Springs High School.

== Academics ==
For the 2018-2019 school year, the school received a B grade from the Texas Education Agency, with an overall score of 86 out of 100. The school received a B grade in each of the three performance domains, with a score of 87 for Student Achievement, 87 for School Progress, and 83 for Closing the Gaps. The school received one of the seven possible distinction designations for Top 25%: Comparative Closing the Gaps.

== Feeder patterns ==
Schools that feed into Cypress Lakes include:

- Elementary schools: Lieder, Sheridan, Wilson, Emery (partial), McFee (partial), Tipps (partial), Brosnahan (partial)
- Middle schools: Watkins, Thornton (partial)

== Notable alumni ==
- Josh Nebo (2015) – basketball player for the Maccabi Tel Aviv of the Israeli Basketball Premier League and EuroLeague
- De'Aaron Fox (2016) – basketball player for the San Antonio Spurs of the NBA
