= Cody Risien =

American football player (born 1957)

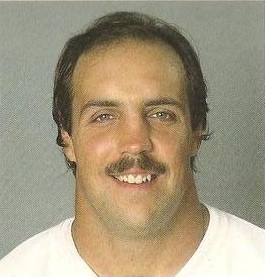

No. 63
- Position: Offensive tackle

Personal information
- Born: March 22, 1957 (age 69); Bryan, Texas, U.S.
- Listed height: 6 ft 7 in (2.01 m)
- Listed weight: 290 lb (132 kg)

Career information
- High school: Cy-Fair (Cypress, Texas)
- College: Texas A&M
- NFL draft: 1979: 7th round, 183rd overall pick

Career history
- Cleveland Browns (1979–1989)

Awards and highlights
- Second-team All-Pro (1983); 2× Pro Bowl (1986, 1987); PFWA All-Rookie Team (1979); Cleveland Browns Legends; First-team All-SWC (1978); Second-team All-SWC (1977)

Career NFL statistics
- Games played: 146
- Games started: 140
- Fumble recoveries: 2
- Stats at Pro Football Reference

Cody Lewis Risien (/ˈraɪzɛn/ RY-zen; born March 22, 1957) is an American former professional football player who was an offensive tackle for 11 seasons with the Cleveland Browns of the National Football League (NFL). Risien blocked for four 1,000-yard rushers. He was a part of five AFC Central Division titles (1980, 1985, 1986, 1987, 1989) and was selected to two Pro Bowls (1987, 1988).

He played college football for the Texas A&M Aggies. Risien is also a 1975 graduate of Cy-Fair High School in Houston, Texas.

== Early life ==
Risien was born in Bryan, Texas, near College Station. His family moved around Texas. When he was in high school in 1971, his family moved to Cy-Fair. Beginning in his sophomore season, he played on Cy-Fair High School's football varsity team. However, they never made the playoffs in the three seasons he was there.

== College career ==
Risien played college football for the Texas A&M Aggies. In his sophomore season, the Aggies went 10–2 and were ranked seventh in the country. In his time there, he made two All-SWC teams.

== Professional career ==
Risien was drafted 183rd overall in the seventh round of the 1979 NFL Draft by the Cleveland Browns. In his rookie season, he started 10 games and played in all 16 as the Browns had a 9–7 record. He also made the All-Rookie Team. At 6 ft 7, he was the tallest guard in league history at the time.

After that season, Risien moved to the tackle position. This time he started all the games as the Browns held an 11–5 record in 1980 and won the AFC Central Division title. However, they lost to the Oakland Raiders in the divisional round.

The following season, the Browns fell to a 5–11 record. A lockout-shortened season then gave them a 4–5 record, good enough to get into the playoffs where they lost to the Raiders once again.

In 1984, Risien missed the entire regular season due to a preseason knee injury. He returned in 1985, helping the Browns clinch another AFC Central Division title. In 1986, he made his first Pro Bowl appearance. In his final season, he played every game despite tearing cartilage in his knee.

Risien announced on March 22, 1990 that he was retiring. However, he reported to training camp in June the following season to try to play for an 11th season. A few days later, he officially retired.

== Post-playing career ==
Before turning pro, Risien had graduated from with a degree from the Texas A&M School of Architecture in 1979. In 1990, Risien began working in the construction industry in Cleveland for Schirmer Construction. A decade later, he moved back to Texas and began working with a large construction company based in Austin. Cody worked at Austin Commercial, a large commercial construction manager, as a Sr. Project Manager for over 20 years prior to retiring. He also did ministry, becoming a lay minister at the St. Barnabas Episcopal Church in Bay Village.

== Personal life ==
Cody is married to Amy (Hough) Risien. Cody has seven daughters. 4 of them are step daughters. They live in the greater Austin area with his wife, Amy.

== Legacy ==
Cody was inducted into the Cleveland Browns Hall of Legends in 2010.

Cody was inducted into the Texas A&M Athletic Hall of Fame in 2011.
