= Cypress Park High School =

Public school in Texas, United States

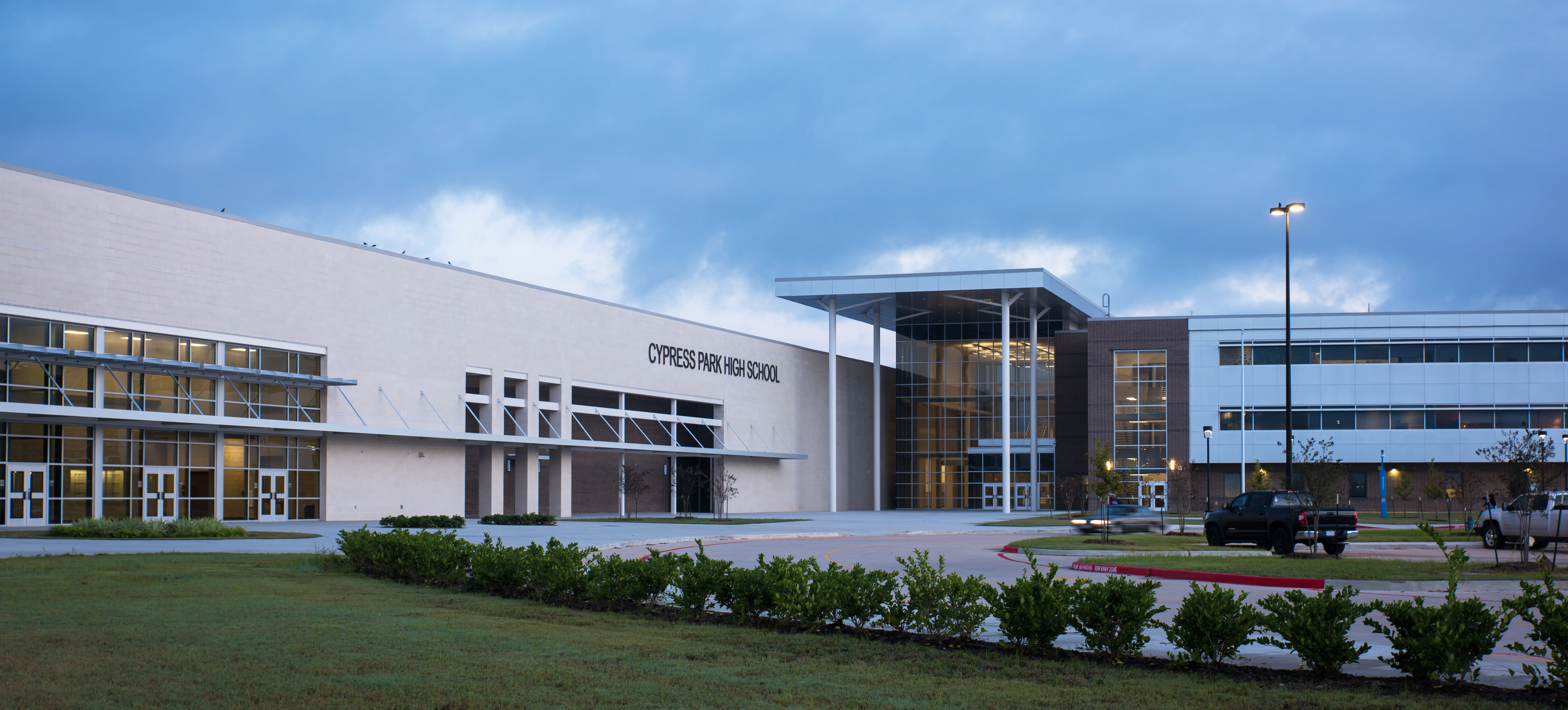

Location
- 7425 Westgreen Blvd; Cypress, TX 77433; United States; 29.8847123°N 95.7430579°W

Information
- Type: Public high school
- Motto: "Rise Up! Take Courage! Do It!"
- Established: 2016
- School district: Cypress-Fairbanks Independent School District
- Principal: Michael Contreras
- Faculty: 200.38 FTE
- Grades: 9-12
- Enrollment: 3,051 (2023-2024)
- Student to teacher ratio: 15.23
- Colors: Black & Gold
- Athletics: UIL 6A
- Athletics conference: University Interscholastic League
- Team name: Tigers
- Website: cypark.cfisd.net

Cypress Park High School (nicknamed Cy Park) is a high school located in Cypress, an unincorporated area of Harris County, Texas, in Greater Houston. It is a part of the Cypress-Fairbanks Independent School District (CFISD) and is in its southwestern part.

== History ==
CFISD purchased the site that now contains Cypress Park High in 2006. The district considered building a new high school there shortly after the purchase occurred, but it delayed its plans due to the Texas state government removing funding to the district and the Great Recession. The district resumed its plans due to an increase of students in the district.

Cy-Park is the district's 11th traditional high school to open; it was tentatively known as "HS No. 11" until the CFISD board approved the school's permanent name in August 2015. The opening relieved Cypress Lakes High School and Cypress Springs High School. It was funded by a 2007 school bond.

The school opened on August 22, 2016. In its first year it had 9th grade students (freshmen) and added one more grade level each subsequent year until all four years were present. The district anticipates that the school will hold 3,000 students.

The school's first principal is Chris Hecker; he was hired in that role by the CFISD board in 2015, and he previously was the principal of CFISD's Dean Middle School in Houston. In its first school year it had 48 teachers.

== Campus ==
The campus, designed by PBK Architects and built by Satterfield & Pontikes, has a three-story classroom wing, a cafeteria building, a utility plant building, and an athletic and art building. The campus has a total of 592,000 square feet (55,000 m^{2}) of space. The school uses a layout not used in previously-built CFISD high schools.

Cypress Park is located within a complex of CFISD schools, referred to as an "Educational Village", which will also have an elementary and middle school and cover a total of 179-acre (72 ha) of land; it will have a central food service area.

== Academics ==
For the 2018–2019 school year, the school received a B grade from the Texas Education Agency, with an overall score of 86 out of 100. The school received a B grade in each of the three performance domains, with a score of 82 for Student Achievement, 88 for School Progress, and 81 for Closing the Gaps. The school received four of the seven possible distinction designations for Academic Achievement in Science, Academic Achievement in Social Studies, Post-Secondary Readiness, and Top 25%: Comparative Closing the Gaps.

== Athletics ==
The school, upon its opening, hired Greg Rogers, previously the Cypress Falls High School American football team assistant coach and girls' track team head track coach, as its head coach and the coach of the school's football. The remainder of the athletic staff had been hired by July 2016. Cypress Park will begin 6A varsity play in 2018 UIL Season.

== Demographics ==
The demographic breakdown of the 1,216 students enrolled for 2017-18 was:

- African American: 27.7%
- Hispanic: 57.4%
- White: 8.4%
- Native American: 0.9%
- Asian: 3.8%
- Pacific Islander: 0.0%
- Two or More Races: 1.8%

65.1% of the students were eligible for free or reduced-cost lunch. For 2017–18, Cypress Falls was a Title I school.

== Feeder patterns ==
Schools that feed into Cypress Park include:

- Elementary schools: Hemmenway, M. Robinson, Walker, Emery (partial), Hoover/Jowell (partial), André (partial), Brosnahan (partial)
- Middle schools: Rowe, Thornton (partial)

== Notable alumni ==
- Harold Perkins Jr. (2022) – American football linebacker
