= Harold Perkins Jr. =

American football player (born 2004)

Harold Perkins
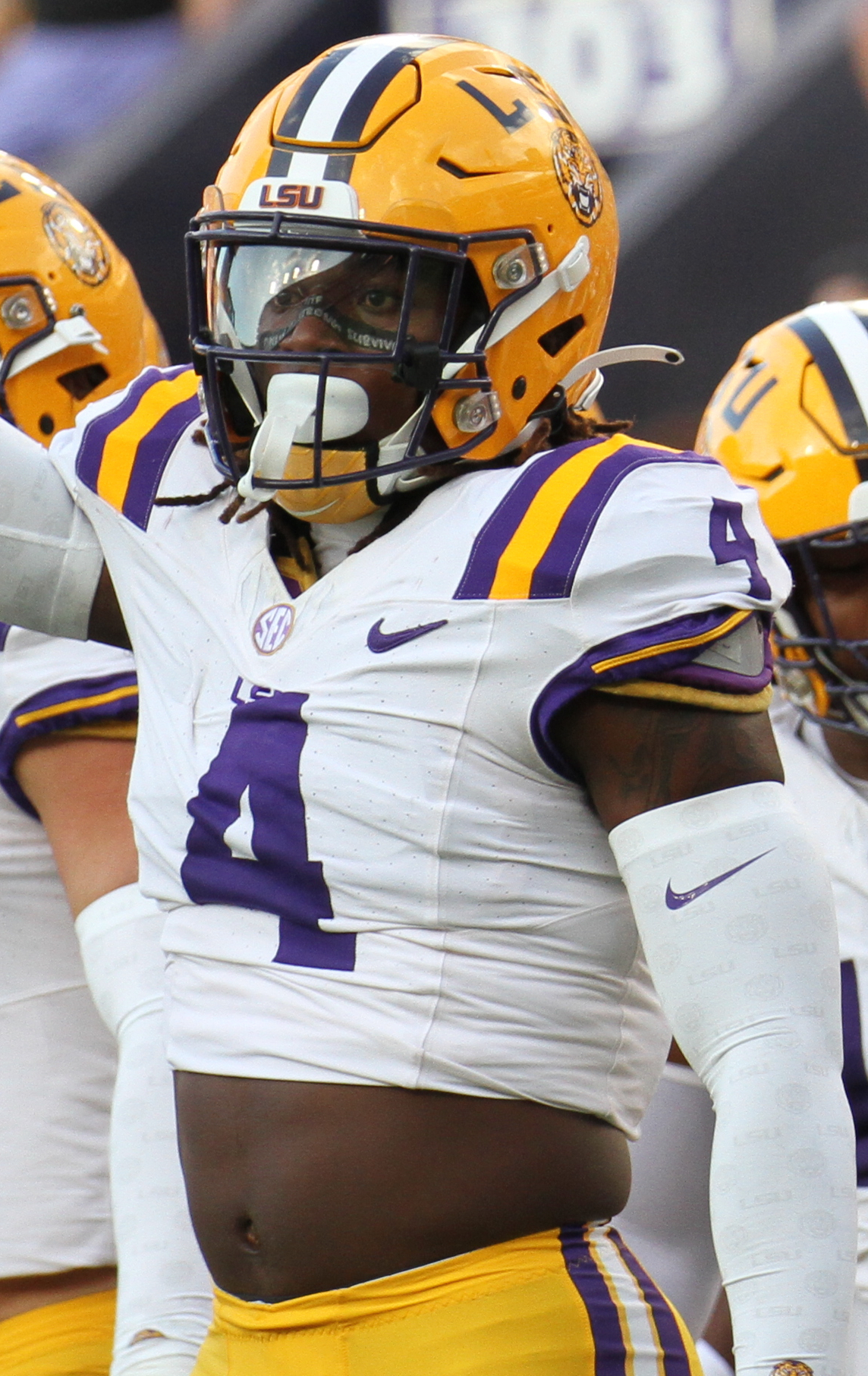
- Perkins in 2023

No. 56 – Atlanta Falcons
- Position: Linebacker
- Roster status: Active

Personal information
- Born: September 10, 2004 (age 22); New Orleans, Louisiana, U.S.
- Listed height: 6 ft 1 in (1.85 m)
- Listed weight: 223 lb (101 kg)

Career information
- High school: Cypress Park (Cypress, Texas)
- College: LSU (2022–2025)
- NFL draft: 2026: 6th round, 215th overall pick

Career history
- Atlanta Falcons (2026–present)

Awards and highlights
- First-team All-SEC (2022); Second-team All-SEC (2023); Third-team All-SEC (2025)

Career NFL statistics as of Week 4, 2026
- Tackles: 32
- Sacks: 0.5
- Fumble recoveries: 1
- Pass deflections: 1
- Stats at Pro Football Reference

Harold Perkins Jr. (born September 10, 2004) is an American professional football linebacker for the Atlanta Falcons of the National Football League (NFL). He played college football for the LSU Tigers and was selected by the Falcons in the sixth round of the 2026 NFL draft.

== Early life ==
Perkins was born in New Orleans, Louisiana, but his family was displaced by Hurricane Katrina a year after his birth. Perkins’ mother, Bertha Walton, grandmother, and aunt attempted to gather the family elsewhere in New Orleans, but the storm was too much. They eventually climbed through two houses to seek refuge in the hallway of their neighbor’s home until Perkins' uncle evacuated the family in a 2004 Chevrolet Blazer. 17 members of the family would evacuate to Texas soon after.

Perkins grew up in Cypress, Texas and played high school football and basketball at Cypress Park High School. Perkins played linebacker and running back, earning first team All-Greater Houston as a utility player on offense. He was rated No. 4 nationally and No. 1 at the linebacker position in ESPN's rankings of the 2022 college football recruiting class. He originally committed to Texas A&M, then decommitted, and ultimately signed with LSU. He was the top recruit in LSU's 2022 recruiting class. Between 2009 and 2022, Perkins was one of at least 26 LSU football players who were displaced by Katrina during or before their freshman year in college. Others included Grant Delpit, Saahdiq Charles, and Leonard Fournette.

== College career ==
=== 2022 ===
Perkins won a starting spot at linebacker as a freshman in the fall of 2022. In LSU's upset victory over Alabama, he registered seven pressures and was selected as the SEC Defensive Player of the Week. After the game, LSU coach Brian Kelly said of Perkins: "He's a bit of a throwback, and a throwback in this sense, 'just tell me what to do. I don't need all the other things. And I'll figure it out as I go.'" In week 10 against Arkansas, in a performance described as “dominating”, Perkins tied the LSU single-game record for quarterback sacks with four and forced two fumbles, including the game winner. Following the Arkansas game, Perkins was selected as the SEC Defensive Player of the Week for the second week in a row as well as the Walter Camp Defensive Player of the Week. Through the first ten games of the 2022 season, Perkins totaled 52 tackles, 7.5 sacks, two forced fumbles, and an interception. At the end of the season, he was named to Pro Football Focus's PFF True Freshman All-America team.

=== 2024 ===
On September 22, 2024, it was announced that Perkins had suffered a torn anterior cruciate ligament and would miss the remainder of the season.

=== College statistics ===
Year	Team	Games		Tackles					Interceptions					Fumbles			
Year	Team	GP	GS	Solo	Ast	Cmb	TfL	Sck	Int	Yds	Avg	TD	PD	FR	Yds	TD	FF
2022	LSU	14	8	39	33	72	13.0	7.5	1	-3	-3.0	0	2	0	0	0	4
2023	LSU	13	13	43	32	75	13.0	5.5	1	0	0.0	0	5	0	0	0	3
2024	LSU	4	4	5	12	17	1.5	0.0	0	0	0.0	0	0	1	1	0	0
2025	LSU	12	11	26	30	56	8.0	4.0	3	50	16.7	0	3	1	0	0	1
Career		43	36	113	107	220	35.5	17.0	5	47	9.4	0	10	2	1	0	8

== Professional career ==
Pre-draft measurables
Height	Weight	Arm length	Hand span	Wingspan	40-yard dash	10-yard split	20-yard split	Vertical jump	Broad jump	Bench press
6 ft 0 7/8 in (1.85 m)	223 lb (101 kg)	31 3/8 in (0.80 m)	8 1/8 in (0.21 m)	6 ft 5 1/8 in (1.96 m)	4.40 s	1.56 s	2.63 s	35.0 in (0.89 m)	10 ft 4 in (3.15 m)	20 reps
All values from NFL Combine/Pro Day

Perkins was selected by the Atlanta Falcons in the sixth round with the 215th overall pick of the 2026 NFL Draft.
