= Cy-Fair High School =

Public school in Cypress, Texas, US

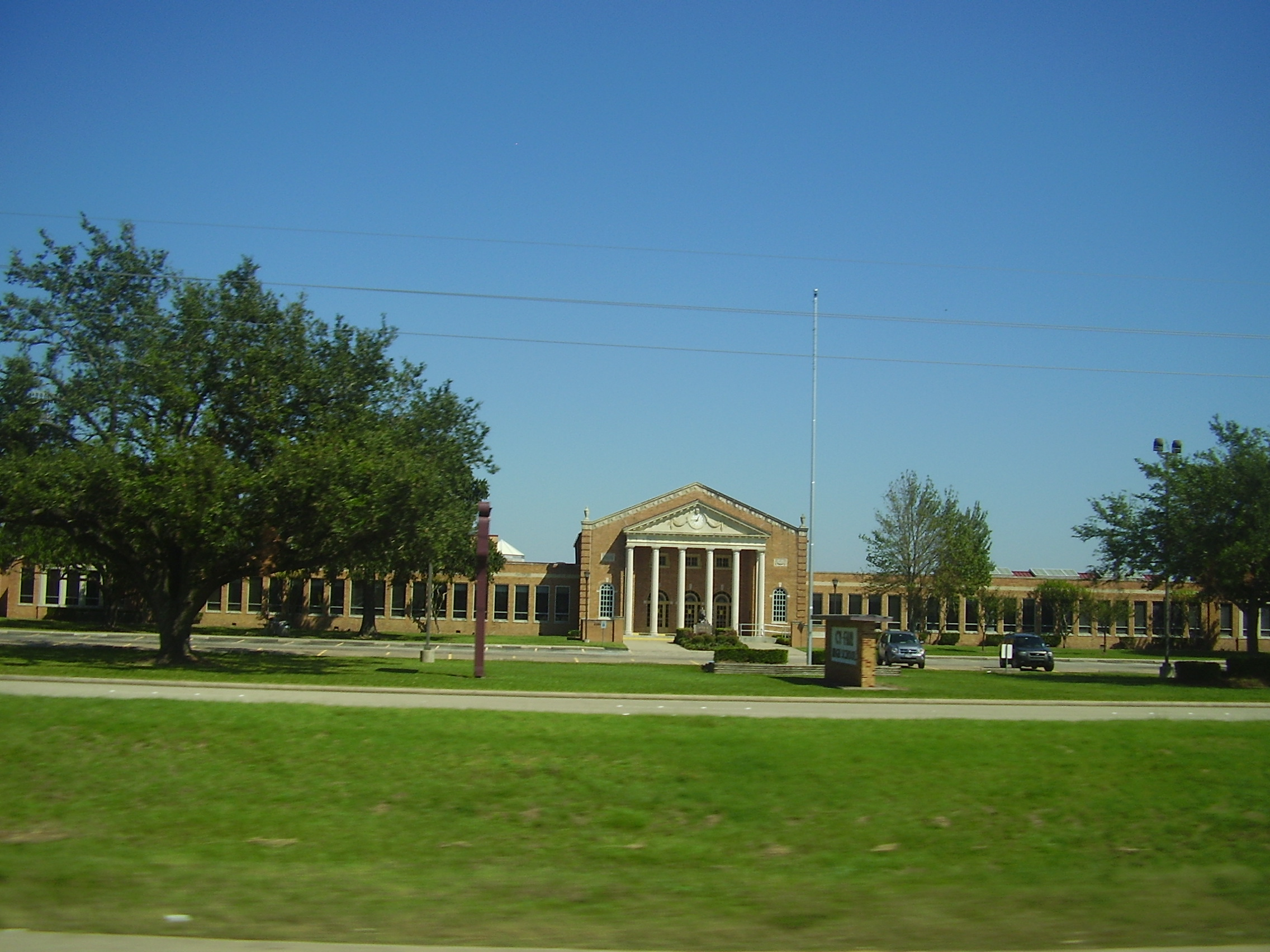

Location
- 22602 Hempstead Freeway (U.S. Highway 290); Cypress, Harris County, Texas 77429; 29.939117°N 95.652673°W

Information
- Type: Co-Educational, Public, Secondary
- Motto: Bobcat Fight Never Dies (BFND)
- Established: 1942
- School district: Cypress-Fairbanks Independent School District
- Principal: Dirk Heath
- Teaching staff: 225.59 (on FTE basis)
- Grades: 9–12
- Enrollment: 3,412 (2023–2024)
- Student to teacher ratio: 15.12
- Colors: Maroon and White
- Athletics: UIL 6A District 17
- Athletics conference: University Interscholastic League
- Team name: Bobcats
- Phone: (281) 897-4600
- Website: cyfair.cfisd.net

Cy-Fair High School is a secondary school located in Cypress, which is an unincorporated place in Harris County, Texas, near Houston. The school is located along U.S. Highway 290 and is part of the Cypress-Fairbanks Independent School District. The school mascot is the bobcat, and the school's colors are white and maroon.

== History ==
=== 1884-1942: Establishment of the Cypress and Fairbanks's separate school systems ===
When the New Orleans Railroad Company's track line to Houston was built in 1856, two towns were established, with Cypress on one side of the track and Fairbanks on the other. Cypress and Fairbanks remained being two separate towns with separate school systems throughout the early 1900s. Though both of their school systems had schools for children up to eighth grade, once they reached high school, students in Fairbanks had to travel to Houston every day for school, and the Cypress high school students had to travel to Addicks.

A 20-acre plot of land was handed out to the district by Louis Telge, also known as the grandfather of the previous School Board members John and Chester Telge. In 1884, the Big Cypress Schoolhouse, No. 2. Dist. 6, was built on the newly donated land in Cypress, Texas. It was also called the "Cypress School". The building was originally a one-room school, however, over the years, the Cypress School was expanded to include seven rooms, a superintendent's office, a library, and a wood-framed schoolhouse for high school students. By 1937, the high school students were transferred to a separate facility, the newly built Rural High School No. 5, which was part of the Fairbanks School District. In December 1939, the citizens living in the area voted to combine the two districts into one united district.

=== 1942-1972: Opening of Cy-Fair High School, racial desegregation, Carverdale students, and Jersey Village High School ===
In the spring of 1942, Cy-Fair High School was officially opened, and students from Rural High School No. 5 were transferred to the new school. First Lady Eleanor Roosevelt, visited the school on the day it opened. The school received its accreditation less than a year after opening. According to Community Impact, Jane Ledbetter with the Cypress Historical Society stated that the school "really solidified the two districts coming together". The wood-framed schoolhouse at the Cypress School burned down in late 1942.

In 1944, CFISD’s Cypress Agriculture and Rodeo Program was established. The following year, the program brought in $12,000.

The Cypress area was quite rural at the time of the school's grand opening, however, in the latter half of the 20th century, Cypress was transitioning from rural to suburban.

Somewhat close to Cy-Fair High school was the Carverdale School for African-American students, which was founded in 1925 when a German dairy farmer donated his farmhouse, which was first used as a Baptist church and school for younger students. The next year, the school was renamed Fairbanks Colored School. At the time, very few teachers worked at the school. From 1928 to 1951, Clara Scott was the school's only teacher.

By 1956, Fairbanks Colored School, which served students ranging from first grade to 12th grade, relocated to Clara Road (named after Clara Scott in her honor in 1937). The school's name was changed to Caverdale School, and was expanded to include a gymnasium, a home economics department, auto mechanics shop class, and a science lab. Like Cy-Fair, the school was progressing rapidly and embracing the open model concept for schools. In 1967, Caverdale students began enrolling at Cy-Fair High School under the "Freedom of Choice" option, eventually totaling 800.

On August 3, 1970, the Caverdale School was closed due to a school board vote. All high school-aged students were transferred to Cy-Fair High School. The Caverdale School building was repurposed into a campus for the Houston Community College. The campus was later torn down, with warehouses being built in its place.

Cy-Fair High School remained the only standing high school in the Cypress Fairbanks School District until Jersey Village High School opened in 1972.

=== 1999-2017: School renovation, 2016 flood, rezoning, and Hurricane Harvey ===
From 1999 to 2001, the school was renovated and further expanded, adding 20 classrooms and a new library. Plans were made to renovate the school in 1998, due to the school becoming increasingly cramped, and the desire to update the classrooms to make way for advancing technology. Voters approved for a bond issue that granted the school more than $29 million in funding for the restoration of the building. The roof of the main corridor at the school was soon removed, and the old Cy-Fair Brigade gym was taken down.

Following heavy rainfall, Cy-Fair High School was flooded on April 18, 2016, as a result of the April 2016 North American storm complex, which affected many parts of the greater Houston area. Cy-Fair was one of the 57 campuses in the Cypress Fairbanks District damaged by the flood. All schools in the district were closed for a week.

On February 5, 2017, the Cy-Fair High School Brigade, along with many other dance teams from the school district, performed with Lady Gaga at the Super Bowl LI Halftime show that took place at NRG Stadium in Houston, Texas.

As part of high school rezoning, a portion of Cy-Fair's attendance zone, as well as portions of Cypress Falls High School and Cypress Woods High School's attendance zones, was to be reassigned to Cypress Ranch High School in 2017.

On August 26, 2017, the school was, once again, flooded as a result of Hurricane Harvey. All of the schools in the Cypress Fairbanks District postponed the opening of the school year of 2017–2018 for two weeks before reopening and setting its new first day of the school year on September 11. Shortly after the hurricane hit, Cy-Fair High School's rugby team volunteered to clean out the flood-damaged homes within their community. The team cleaned out 27 homes, and were honored with a plaque for their contributions to the community.

=== 2020-present: COVID-19 pandemic, 2021 snowstorm, bus route budget cuts ===
In the spring of 2020, due to the COVID-19 pandemic, all schools in the Cypress-Fairbanks School District shut down their campuses, canceling all in person classes for the rest of the 2019–2020 school year. Students and teachers transitioned to using an online learning program.

At the beginning of the 2020-2021 school year, teachers and students returned to campus for a traditional classroom setting, although students had the option to continue to use online learning at home as well. Cy-Fair students would stop using the online remote learning program during the 2021-2022 school year, except in case of emergencies.

In February 2021, all district schools were shut down when Texas was hit with a snowstorm caused by the February 2021 North American cold wave, which resulted in the 2021 Texas power crisis. The snowstorm left dozens of district campuses with massive water damage, some with burst pipes caused by power outages and extremely low temperatures. The students were able to return to school on February 22, with the damages being fixed.

Cy-Fair High School had the highest number of confirmed COVID-19 cases in the 2021–2022 school year, according to district data.

On May 23, 2024, a gun was reported in a trashcan in one of the boys' restrooms. The school and the Cyress Fairbanks ISD Police Department investigated the incident.

During the 2024-2025 school year, the school bus budget was reduced for all schools at CFISD. 79 bus routes were cut without warning, creating massive traffic jams, and four children getting into accidents while walking or cycling to school on busy streets. All middle and high school students in the district who lived two miles or less from their school lacked access to a school bus, because of the budget reduction.

== Academics ==
For the 2018–2019 school year, the school received an A grade from the Texas Education Agency, with an overall score of 90 out of 100. The school received a B grade in two domains, School Progress (score of 87) and Closing the Gaps (score of 85), and an A grade in Student Achievement (score of 92). The school received one of the seven possible distinction designations for Top 25%: Comparative Academic Growth. Cy-Fair was one out of the thirteen CFISD schools have been named to the 2018–2019 Texas Honor Roll, which is an award that recognizes public elementary, middle and high schools that demonstrate high levels of student academic achievement, improvement in achievement over time, and reduction in achievement gaps. For high schools, Honor Roll recognition includes measures of college readiness in students.

The average SAT score at Cy-Fair High School was 1177 for 2018–2019 graduates. The average ACT score was 20.5.

== Athletics ==
Cy-Fair competes athletically in District 17-6A of the University Interscholastic League.

=== Football ===
In 1976, the Bobcats clinched the 16-4A Conference Championship with one of the most electrifying offenses in the Houston area, racking up an impressive average of over 30 points per game. Despite their stellar season, the Bobcats' run ended in the state playoffs, where they fell to a powerhouse Temple Wildcats squad that advanced to the state championship game.

The 1985 football team finished with a 13–1–1 record, losing to perennial power Permian High School 7–10 in the 5A state semifinals.

In 1987, a third-round playoff game against North Mesquite High School ended in a 28–28 tie, with Cy-Fair advancing to the next round due to a 6–5 advantage in penetrations within the 20-yard line. They lost to the eventual champion Plano Senior High School 21–24 in the 5A state quarterfinals.

In 2017, the football team was undefeated with a 15–0 record, winning the 6A Division 2 State Championship over Midway High School.

=== Boys' basketball ===
The 1969–70 boys' basketball team advanced to the 3A state championship game, losing in the final.

In the 1970–71 season, the team won the 4A State Championship, and were given the honorific title of "National Champions". The 1970–71 season was the first in 4A for Cy-Fair High School It is worth noting that Cy-Fair only used five players in the State Championship game against Wheatley. The five were twin brothers Ronald and Donald Dunlap, Jerry Mercer, Bobby Metcalf and Andrew Jones. Jones transferred to Cy-Fair from Carverdale, when Carverdale was closed in the summer of 1970. The other four starters played on the 1969–1970 State 3A runner-up team.

Cy-Fair's head coach, Ronnie Truitt, was a member of the 1954 Milan (Ind.) High boys basketball team, the very team that inspired the film Hoosiers.

The team advanced to the 4A state semifinals in the 1977–78 season. Led by all state selection Alan Howard.

Boys' basketball was the first co-district champion in over a decade in the 2019–20 season achieving a 25–9 overall record and 13–2 in district.

=== Girls' basketball ===
The girls' basketball team won the 5A state championship in the 2007–08 season, defeating DeSoto High School in the final with senior All-American Nneka Ogwumike and her sister sophomore Chiney Ogwumike. The team won another 5A state championship in the 2009–10 season.

=== Volleyball ===
The 1986–87 girls' volleyball team were the 5A state champions, defeating Amarillo High School in the final.

The 2007–2008 girls' volleyball team competed in 5A Region III District 17, achieving a 45–3 overall record with an undefeated district season at 15–0. The team ranked 5th in the state of Texas and 49th nationally.

The 2013–14 girls' volleyball team competed in 5A Region III District 17, achieving a 45–4 overall record with an undefeated district season at 18–0. The team ranked 8th in the state of Texas and 47th nationally.

=== Cross Country ===
The Cy-Fair high school girls’ cross country teams placed among the top 15 teams at the UIL Class 6A Cross Country State Championships, held on November 8, 2014, at Old Settlers Park in Round Rock. Cy-Fair placed 10th overall with a score of 235.

=== Swimming ===
The 2021–2022 girls’ swim team claimed the District 17-6A titles, with 140 points, on February 2, 2022.

== Music ==
=== Band ===
On October 14, 2017, the Cy-Fair High School marching band claimed the grand champion award, or first place in Enrollment Class V, repeating in earning the top award at the third annual Battle at the Berry Marching Contest held at Cy-Fair FCU Stadium. The contest was hosted by the Cypress Springs High School marching band, and featured featured 19 bands from across the Houston area competing in four different classifications based on marching band enrollments.

On April 2, 2022, Cy-Fair High School's indoor percussion ensemble competed in the Texas Color Guard Circuit Percussion/Winds State Championship Finals that was held at Texas A&M University's Reed Arena. The ensemble won in the Percussion Scholastic Open division.

On September 30, 2023, the Cy-Fair High School marching band won their first Bands of America Shenandoah regional, or first place in Enrollment Class AAAA, at the North Houston Bands of America regional Marching Contest held at Woodforest Bank Stadium. They won with 81.000 as their score. It was hosted by the College Park High School marching band. It featured 33 bands from across the Houston area competing in two different classifications based on school enrollment.

On October 30, the Cy-Fair High School marching band competed at the UIL Class 6A State Marching Band Championships at the Alamodome in San Antonio. The following day, the CFHS marching band performed "Caging the Swarm" in the Finals Round. Since the establishment of the 6A classification in 2006, this was the first time the band made it to the final round for 6A in the school's history, and the Cy-Fair and Bridgeland bands were the school district's first ever participants in the Finals Round.

Almost a year later, on September 28, 2024, at the Bands Of America North Houston Regional located at Woodforest Bank Stadium in Conroe, Texas, the school's band earned a second place spot for their production, “Gravity.”

=== Choir ===
On March 2, 2019, the Cy-Fair High School's Cy-Fair Singers won first place at the prestigious Madrigal & Chamber Choir Festival at the Coker United Methodist Church in San Antonio. They were crowned first-place winners out of 38 competing ensembles. They were named as the 2020 honor choir.

== JROTC ==
In the second Marksmanship and Drill Meet, Cy-Fair High School won 10 trophies in 2018.

Cy-Fair High School Air Force JROTC unit has won the Distinguished Unit Award for four years in a row, starting from the school year 2016–2017 and until 2019–2020.

== Journalism ==
The school won two awards for their student-produced publications, one of which was recognized at the Columbia Scholastic Press Association Spring Scholastic Convention, held March 16–18 at Columbia University in New York City. Journalism students at Cy-Fair High School receive a Silver Crown Award at the 2016 CSPA Spring Convention for their 2014–2015 student newspaper, The Reporter. The Reporter was one of 14 schools nationwide to receive the Silver News Print Crown. Prior to the CSPA convention, the 2014–2015 Cy-Fair yearbook, The Bobcat, won the gold medalist Certificate. In addition, the Reporter staff won third place in the Typography: Overall look of the entire paper category.

The school has a newspaper website with articles written by students, called Daily Maroon.

== Art ==
For the art contest held by the Houston Livestock Show and Rodeo, in 2021, three Cy-Fair students won the 2021 Blue Ribbon Award, and one student even made it into the 2D finalist category, receiving a special merit award.

== Foreign Language ==
In the 25th annual Texas State German Contest that happened in 2007, held at the University of Texas at Austin, Cy-Fair High School was placed in second place, followed by Austin Westwood High School. Because Cy-Fair had made it into the top 5, they received a plaque and a monetary contribution.

== Clubs ==
Cy-Fair High School has many after school clubs, such as:

- Book Club
- Computer Science Club
- National Honor Society
- French National Honor Society
- Science Olympiad
- Animation Club
- Spanish Club
- Carpe Diem Poetry Club
- Key Club
- HOSA
- Asian Student Association
- PALS
- Paws For A Cause
- BCTV (Bobcat TV)
- Physics Club
- Future Business Leaders of America
- Sociedad Honoraria Hispánica
- Drama Club
- Environmental Action Committee
- Rubik's Cube Club
- Future Farmers of America
- Anime Club
- Girls That Code
- Guitar Club
- Magic: The Gathering (MTG) Club
- Destination Imagination
- Chess Club
- Family, Career and Community Leaders of America.
- Brigade
- Art Club
- Black Student Union (BSU)
- FCA
- FCCLA
- Finance Club
- Booster Club (non-profit that helps to improve UIL sanctioned athletic programs of Cy-Fair High School and to fund scholarships)
- Parkour Club
- No Place For Hate
- Student Mental Health Alliance
- Table Top Teenagers
- Game Development Team

== Demographics ==
=== Students ===
The demographic breakdown of the 3,414 students enrolled for 2023–24 was:

- White: 31.6%
- Hispanic: 38.0%
- African American: 17.6%
- Asian: 8.6%
- Native American: 0.5%
- Pacific Islander: 0.1%
- Two or More Races: 3.6%

47.9% of students attending Cy-Fair High School are economically disadvantaged.

38.4% of the students were eligible for free or reduced-cost lunch in the school year of 2019–2020.

For the class of 2020, the four-year graduation rate at Cy-fair High School is 94.2%, and the dropout rate for all students, regardless of grade level, was 0.9% in the school year of 2019–2020.

In 2018–2019, 3.5% of the students were enrolled in bilingual and English language learning programs. This increased in the school year 2020–2021, with the percentage being 4.2%.

=== Teachers/Staff ===
The average number of years a teacher has been employed in any district, whether or not there was an interruption in service, is 12.5 years.

The average teacher salary at the school is $55,737.

== Feeder patterns ==
All Arnold Middle School and some Hamilton Middle School students are within Cy-Fair High School's attendance boundary.

There are four elementary schools that feed into Arnold Middle School:

- Adam Elementary
- Danish Elementary (partial)
- Lamkin Elementary (partial)
- Millsap Elementary (partial)

There are two elementary schools that feed into Hamilton Middle School within Cy-Fair's attendance boundary:

- Black Elementary (partial)
- Hamilton Elementary (partial)

== Notable alumni ==
- Austin Deculus — National Football League (NFL) player
- Sandy Duncan — Actress, comedian, singer, and dancer.
- Robbie Grossman — Major League Baseball (MLB) outfielder
- Lindsey Harding — professional basketball player
- Jonathan Horton — gymnast
- Braden Mann — National Football League (NFL) player
- Sam McGuffie — National Football League (NFL) player, Olympic bobsledder
- Cal McNair — National Football League (NFL) owner
- Chiney Ogwumike — Women's National Basketball Association (WNBA) professional basketball player
- Nneka Ogwumike — Women's National Basketball Association (WNBA) professional basketball player
- Tony Oller — actor/musician, was on Disney Channel for the show As the Bell Rings and other shows such as CSI: NY and Gigantic
- Cody Risien — National Football League (NFL) player
- Molly Searcy — Anime voice over and stage theatre actress
- Carlene Watkins — actress, was on shows such as Best of the West, Tough Enough, and Tortellis
- Hayden Wesneski — Major League Baseball (MLB) pitcher
- Fred Whitfield — calf roper
- Woody Williams — MLB pitcher
- Brock Wright — National Football League (NFL) player
- Tony Wyllie — NFL executive

== Notable faculty ==
- Dan Kubiak, member of the Texas House of Representatives from 1969 to 1983 and again from 1991 to 1998, taught and coached at Cy-Fair from 1963 to 1968
- Ed Pustejovsky, head football coach from 2004 to 2020 and campus athletic director at Cy-Fair High School. Seven district football titles and 13 playoff trips. 6A Div II state championship title in 2017
