= Langham Creek High School =

Public school in Texas, United States

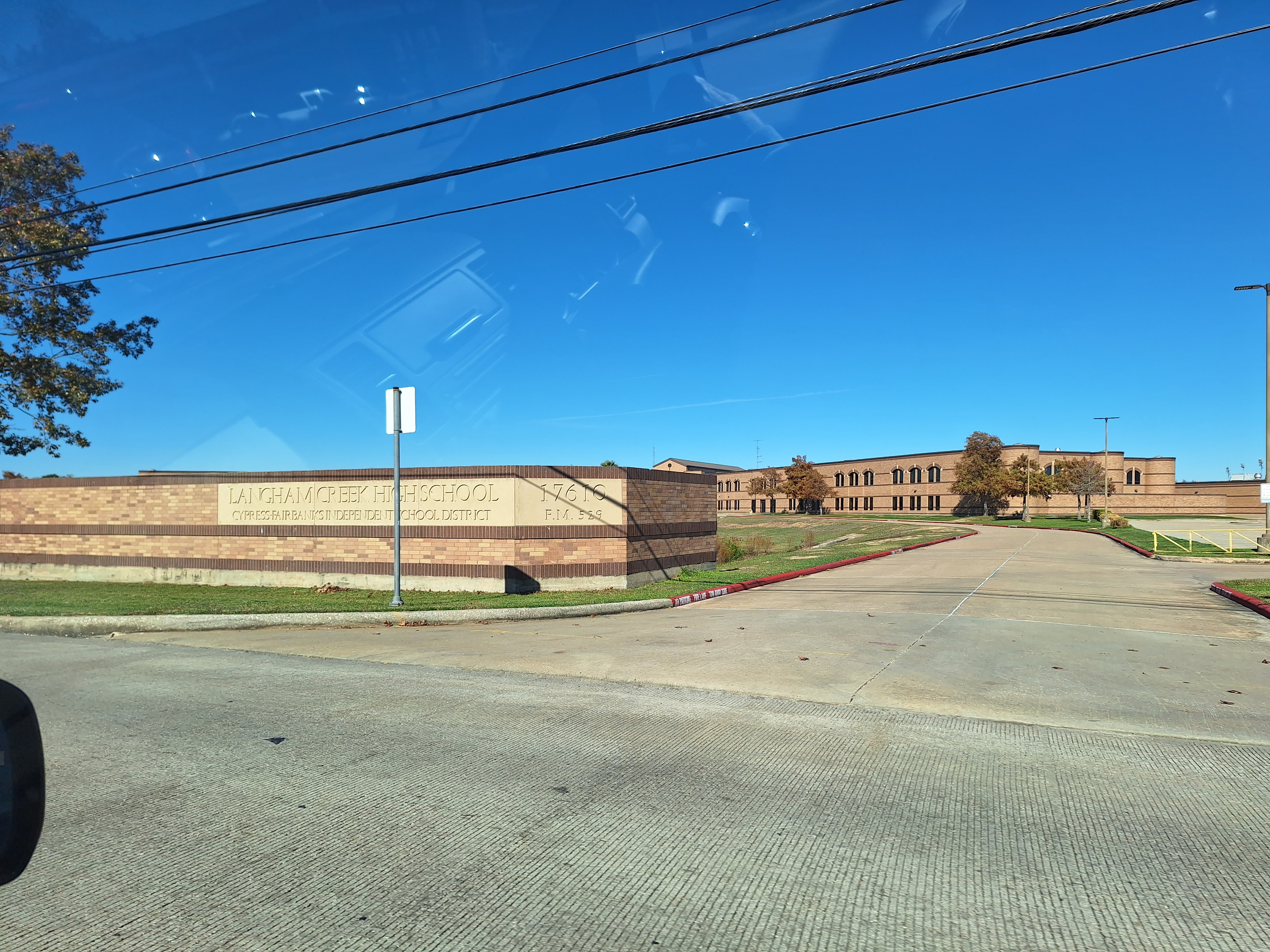

Location
- 17610 FM 529; Houston, Texas 77095; United States; 29.88134°N 95.67712°W

Information
- Type: Public high school
- Established: 1984
- School district: Cypress-Fairbanks Independent School District
- Principal: José Martinez
- Faculty: 197.54 FTE (2023–2024)
- Grades: 9–12
- Enrollment: 2,871 (2023–2024)
- Student to teacher ratio: 14.53 (2023–2024)
- Colors: Red, black and white
- Athletics: UIL 6A
- Athletics conference: University Interscholastic League
- Team name: Lobos
- Website: langhamcreek.cfisd.net

Langham Creek High School is a high school located in an unincorporated area in Harris County, Texas, United States, near Houston. Langham Creek, which was established in 1984, is part of the Cypress Fairbanks Independent School District. Several communities, including Concord Bridge, Westgate, Northglen, Copper Lakes, and parts of the Copperfield subdivision, are zoned to the school.

The mascot is the "lobo", Spanish for "wolf", and the school's motto is "The Power of the Pack is the Lobo. The Power of the Lobo is the Pack." The mascot may have been selected as an homage to the red wolves that were hunted for bounty in the area during the 1950s and 1960s. Carcasses of the wolves were strung along the fences at the nearby intersection of FM 529 and State Highway 6, which became known as Wolf Corner.

== History ==
The school was established in 1984, and it opened for its first official semester in fall of 1985. Due to Cy-Fair High School, Jersey Village High School, and Cypress Creek High School being the only three existing high schools in the Cypress Fairbanks School District, the three schools were getting crowded. To fix the issue, the district wanted to open a fourth school. They built the Langham Creek High School on an area formerly known as Wolf Corners.

Langham Creek was the fourth senior high school in the growing school district. At the time it was the largest high school under one roof and the largest two-story building in the state. In order to accommodate students by not transferring seniors and even juniors, the first year of Langham Creek was actually held in what is currently Labay Middle School. It housed a freshman and sophomore class, as well as an eighth grade class, and was considered Langham Creek Interim High School. Since the eighth grade class was not technically a high school class, all eighth grade classrooms and activities were separated from the other classes. This was during the 1984-1985 school year, while the current building was being completed. The following year, the doors were opened to the brand new building with three classes, freshmen, sophomores and juniors. There was not a senior class in the first year of the building being opened; the first seniors to graduate from Langham Creek were the class of 1987.

Langham Creek was named a National Blue Ribbon School in 1990-91.

In 2016, as part of high school rezoning, a portion of Cypress Falls High School's attendance zone was reassigned to Langham Creek High School, while a portion of Langham Creek's zone was reassigned to Cypress Springs High School.

== Academics ==
For the 2018-2019 school year, the school received an A grade from the Texas Education Agency, with an overall score of 90 out of 100. The school received a B grade in two domains, School Progress (score of 89) and Closing the Gaps (score of 89), and an A grade in Student Achievement (score of 91). The school received six of the seven possible distinction designations. The only distinction designation the school did not receive was Post-Secondary Readiness.

For two years in a row, LCHS was the only CFISD district high school that earned all 7 EOC Distinction Designations, which recognizes outstanding academic achievement in reading/ELA on a variety of indicators.

== Feeder patterns ==
Schools that feed into Langham Creek include:

- Elementary schools: Holmsley, Lowery, Metcalf, Birkes (partial), Copeland (partial), Hoover / Jowell (partial), Tipps (partial), Woodard (partial)
- Middle schools: Aragon, Kahla (partial)

== Computer science ==
- The Langham Creek HS Computer Science Team has won the TCEA Large School State Championship seven times (1991, 1992, 1993, 1996, 1997, 1998, 1999).
- The Langham Creek HS Computer Science Team has won the UIL 5A State Championship three times (1992, 1993, 1999).

== Science Olympiad ==
Langham Creek Science Olympiad (also known as LCHS SciOly), competes in Division C of the Texas Science Olympiad within the Houston region, notably at Rice University, and regularly qualifying for the Texas State Tournament at Texas A&M with recent mid-tier state appearances including 23rd in 2024 and 25th in 2026. Beyond competing across core academic, laboratory, and engineering build events, the program anchors regional scheduling as the host of the annual Langham Creek High School Invitational, welcoming a competitive field of Division C teams from across Texas each season.

=== Recent Season Results ===
Season	Regional Place	State Place
2024	3rd	23rd
2025	5th	—
2026	5th	25th

== Band ==
As of 2021, the Langham Creek High School Band had made UIL sweepstakes for the previous 33 years. They also advanced to every UIL 5A Texas State Marching Band contest from 1994 through 2012, and in 2016, placing top 10 in 1996, 1998, 2000, 2002, 2004, and 2006. In 2002 and 2006 the Langham Creek High School Symphonic Band won the Texas UIL Honor Band Competition.

== Demographics ==
The demographic breakdown of the 2,871 students enrolled for 2023-24 was:

- African American: 18.7%
- Hispanic: 52.9%
- White: 17.0%
- Native American: 0.4%
- Asian: 8.4%
- Pacific Islander: 0.1%
- Two or More Races: 2.5%

58.9% of students attending Langham Creek High School are economically disadvantaged.

== Legal issues ==
In the 2021-2022 school year two female teachers resigned while being investigated for sexual relations with students.

== Notable alumni ==
- Quartney Davis (2016) - NFL wide receiver
- Eric Edwards Jr. (born 2000), American hurdler
- Bert Emanuel (1989) - former NFL wide receiver
- Lilly Ghalichi (2001) - American Lawyer, Blogger, Businesswoman, and Reality Television Star
- Kelechi Osemele (2007) - NFL offensive lineman
- Riff Raff - rapper
- Jamar Williams (2002) - former NFL linebacker
- Bryant Barnes (2021) - American singer-songwriter
