= Russell Shepard =

American football player (born 1990)

No. 89, 19, 81
- Positions: Special teamer Wide receiver

Personal information
- Born: September 17, 1990 (age 36); Houston, Texas, U.S.
- Listed height: 6 ft 1 in (1.85 m)
- Listed weight: 195 lb (88 kg)

Career information
- High school: Cypress Ridge (Houston)
- College: LSU
- NFL draft: 2013: undrafted

Career history
- Philadelphia Eagles (2013)*; Tampa Bay Buccaneers (2013–2016); Carolina Panthers (2017); New York Giants (2018–2019)
- * Offseason or practice squad member only

Career NFL statistics
- Receptions: 60
- Receiving yards: 847
- Receiving touchdowns: 6
- Total tackles: 45
- Forced fumbles: 1
- Stats at Pro Football Reference

Russell Shepard (born September 17, 1990) is an American former professional football player who was a wide receiver and special teamer in the National Football League (NFL). He played college football for the LSU Tigers and was signed as an undrafted free agent by the Philadelphia Eagles. Shepard has also played for the Tampa Bay Buccaneers, Carolina Panthers, and New York Giants.

== Early life ==
Shepard attended Cypress Ridge High School in Harris County, Texas. He started his high school career as a quarterback.

Although Shepard was heavily recruited by Texas and received interests from Florida, Michigan, and USC, he announced his decision to accept a scholarship from Louisiana State University on March 3, 2008. He committed to LSU because he believed he would get the best chance at playing quarterback there. Texas told Shepard that if he didn't win the starting job at quarterback, then he could play other positions. USC likewise found him to be a Reggie Bush-type player in their offense.

He graduated high school in December 2008 to start his college career a semester early. Shepard stated that he intended to learn the team's football system during LSU's spring practices that year.

He played in the 2009 Under Armour All-America Game on January 4, 2009. As of March 2009, he was ranked as the #3 Athlete on ESPN150 for the high school class of 2009.

As a senior, the 6-1, 179-pound Shepard rushed for 1,946 yards and 28 touchdowns and threw for 1,843 yards and 20 touchdowns for legendary coach Gary Thiebaud. Shepard also led Cy-Ridge to a 17-5A district championship in 2007. Alongside Matt Barkley, Shepard was considered the top quarterback of the high school class of 2009 by both Rivals.com and Scout.com before converting to wide receiver upon arriving at LSU.

He was compared to Florida wide receiver Percy Harvin by a Scouts, Inc. reporter.

=== Awards and honors ===
- Selected to the 2008 All-Greater Houston Team by the Touchdown Club of Houston.
- Won the 2008 Offensive Player of the Year award given by the Touchdown Club of Houston.
- First-team selection on Dave Campbell’s Texas Football Super Team
- 2009 PARADE All-American

== College career ==
Shepard played college football for the LSU Tigers. He saw time at running back and receiver early in his freshman year, particularly the former due to depth concerns at the positions, before permanently switching to receiver. He ended his LSU career with 52 receptions and 572 rushing yards.

== Professional career ==
=== Philadelphia Eagles ===
Shepard was signed as an undrafted free agent following the 2013 NFL draft.

=== Tampa Bay Buccaneers ===
One day after being released by the Philadelphia Eagles, Shepard was claimed off waivers by the Tampa Bay Buccaneers on September 1, 2013.

After leading the team in special teams tackles in 2014, Shepard was named special teams captain for the 2015 season, a role he would reprise in the 2016 season.

=== Carolina Panthers ===
On March 10, 2017, Shepard signed a three-year contract with the Carolina Panthers. On September 10, 2017, against the San Francisco 49ers in Week 1, he had two receptions for 53 yards, which included a 40-yard touchdown reception from quarterback Cam Newton. He finished the season with 17 receptions for 202 yards and one touchdown.

On May 14, 2018, Shepard was released by the Panthers.

=== New York Giants ===
On May 22, 2018, Shepard signed with the New York Giants on a one-year, $1.3 million deal worth up to $2 million in incentives. In Week 13 against the Chicago Bears, Shepard had 2 catches for 59 yards and a touchdown. The touchdown reception came from fellow wide receiver and fellow former LSU player Odell Beckham Jr.

On April 10, 2019, Shepard re-signed with the Giants. He was placed on injured reserve on September 26, with a foot sprain.

On September 17, 2020, Shepard announced his retirement from the NFL.

== Personal life ==
Shepard's mother is a medical recruiter for a local hospital, and his father runs his own construction business.
