= Cypress, Texas =

Unincorporated community in Texas, United States

- Unincorporated community
- Location within the state of Texas Cypress (the United States)
- Coordinates: 29°58′15″N 95°41′50″W
- Country: United States
- State: Texas
- County: Harris

Population (2020)
  - Total: 200,839
- Time zone: UTC-6 (Central (CST))
  - Summer (DST): UTC-5 (CDT)
- ZIP codes: 77429, 77433
- Area codes: 281/346/621/713/832

Cypress is an unincorporated community in Harris County, Texas, United States, located completely inside the extraterritorial jurisdiction of the city of Houston. The Cypress area is located along U.S. Route 290 (Northwest Freeway) twenty-four miles (35 km) northwest of Downtown Houston. The Cypress urban cluster ranks 50th in the top 100 highest-income urban areas in the United States.

Large scale residential and commercial development beginning in the 1980s transformed the once rural area into one of the Houston area's largest suburban communities. If it were to be incorporated as a city, it would be the second largest city in Greater Houston, the 18th largest city in Texas, and the 125th largest city in the United States.

== History ==
The recent find of a San Patrice projectile point at the Dimond Knoll site nearby on Cypress Creek attests to a human presence in the area by 7500 BC. By the early historic era, the area around present-day Cypress was populated by Atakapa and Akokisa Indian tribes, but they soon disappeared after the appearance of German settlers in the 1840s.

The German heritage is most notably reflected in the names of some of the major thoroughfares of the area, such as Huffmeister and Telge Roads. General Sam Houston and his Texas Army camped in the area on March 22, 1836 on the way to Harrisburg, which is now in East Houston, just days before the Battle of San Jacinto.

The area remained mostly rural until the early 1990s when developers began construction of several master-planned communities. The area is often referred to as Cy-Fair or Cypress-Fairbanks, which comes from when the Big Cypress School and Fairbanks High School combined in the 1930s to form Cy-Fair Senior High School and the Cypress-Fairbanks Independent School District. In March 2008, the Cypress Historical Society (CHS) was formed as a non-profit corporation with its primary mission being "...to discover, educate, promote, collect, preserve and make available to the public, historical documents and artifacts of the Cypress area". The CHS organization holds regular events aimed at exposing Cypress' residents to the historical and cultural foundation upon which the area was built.

== Geography ==
Cypress is located near the intersection of US Highway 290 and Spring-Cypress Road. Cypress is located within the Cypress Creek and Little Cypress Creek watershed. There are no official boundary lines for the exact area, but roads commonly mentioned to bound the area include FM 529 road as the southern border, HWY 6 and FM 1960 as the eastern border, and HWY 249 as the northern border.

Cypress has two distinct geographic profiles separated by Highway 290. The area northeast of US 290 is forested and thickly wooded, while the area southwest of 290 is predominately ranch land and grassy prairie dotted with scrub brush, Live oaks and Post oaks.

Cypress falls under the jurisdiction of Harris County Precincts 4 and 5 (separated by Cypress Creek).

Several of the subdivisions are built around man made lakes.

Major arteries include Highway 290 to the South and State Highway 249 to the east.

== Climate ==
The climate in this area is characterized by hot, humid summers and generally mild to cool winters. According to the Köppen Climate Classification system, Cypress has a humid subtropical climate, abbreviated "Cfa" on climate maps.

Due to its close proximity to the gulf coast, Cypress is occasionally hit by landfalling tropical storms and hurricanes; the most significant storms to impact the area in recent history have been Hurricane Alicia in 1983, Hurricane Ike in 2008, and Hurricane Harvey in 2017. According to Risk Factor, for the next 30 years, Cypress has a minor risk of flooding, meaning that it is probable that flooding may impact the everyday life in the area. 20% of all the properties in Cypress have a greater than 26% chance of being severely flooded over the next three decades.

== Demographics ==
As of the 2020 US Census, there were approximately 200,839 people living in the two zip codes labeled as Cypress (77429 population 94,176 and 77433 population 106,663). There were 66,150 housing units.

Average household income for Cypress was $138,261; median household income was $116,054.

== Healthcare ==
There are two major hospitals in the Cypress area: HCA Houston Healthcare North Cypress (formerly North Cypress Medical Center), and Memorial Hermann Cypress Hospital. Construction of Houston Methodist Cypress Hospital is currently under way on the former Texas Instruments/Compaq/Hewlett-Packard, Sysco campus, scheduled to open first quarter of 2025.

== Government and infrastructure ==
The area of Cypress is served by two professional fire departments, Cy-Fair Fire Department and Cypress Creek FD. It is also assisted by the city of Jersey Village in its fire suppression activities.

The United States Postal Service operates the Cypress Post Office at 16635 Spring Cypress Road.

Law enforcement for the Cypress area is provided by the Harris County Constable Precinct 4 and 5 and the Harris County Sheriff's Office.

== Economy ==
In 2023, OpenDoor.com named Cypress (77433) as the #1 hottest Zip Code for home buyers in the United States. In 2010, Sysco announced that it purchased the former Hewlett-Packard call center along U.S. Highway 290 in Cypress and that it would establish a shared services facility for its distribution centers in North America.

The National Football League's Houston Texans plan to move their headquarters and practice facility from NRG Stadium to Cypress in 2029.

== Education ==
=== Primary and secondary schools ===
==== Public schools ====
Cypress is served by Cypress-Fairbanks Independent School District and Tomball ISD. Cy-Fair ISD is the third largest school district in the State of Texas and one of the fastest growing in the United States. CFISD serves over 118,000 students as of 2024.

Cypress-Fairbanks ISD high school students attend Cy-Fair Senior High School, Cypress Lakes High School, Jersey Village High School, Cypress Creek High School, Cypress Falls High School, Cypress Woods High School, Cypress Springs High School, Langham Creek High School, Cypress Ridge High School, Cypress Ranch High School, Cypress Park High School and Bridgeland High School.

Windfern High School offers an alternative path toward graduation for accepted students from the above high school attendance zones.

==== Private schools ====
St. Elizabeth Ann Seton School, a K-8 Roman Catholic school operated by the Roman Catholic Archdiocese of Galveston-Houston, is in close proximity to Cypress.

Cypress Christian School, a K–12 private school, is located in the area.

Covenant Academy operates as a K-12 Classical Christian School.

The Oaks Adventist Christian School is in Cypress.

The closest Catholic high schools are Frassati Catholic High School in north Harris County, in the Spring area; and Saint John XXIII High School (formerly Pope John XXIII High School) in western Harris County, within Greater Katy. In addition St. Thomas High School, an all boys' high school in central Houston, has a bus service from and to Christ the Redeemer Catholic School.

Silverline Montessori School is a private Montessori school in Cypress.

=== Colleges and universities ===
Lone Star College (originally the North Harris Montgomery Community College District) serves the community. The territory in Cypress-Fairbanks ISD joined the community college district in 2000. Cypress is home of the Lone Star College–CyFair campus.

=== Public libraries ===
Harris County Public Library (HCPL) operates public libraries in the Cypress area.

LSC-Cyfair Library, a partner effort between HCPL and Lone Star College System, is located at 9191 Barker-Cypress Road on the Lone Star College–CyFair campus. The Northwest Branch Library is located at 11355 Regency Green Drive.

== Notable people ==
- Cammile Adams, Olympic swimmer; grew up in Cypress
- Mary Kay Ash, founder of Mary Kay Cosmetics; born in Hot Wells, which is now part of Cypress
- Shane Baz, American baseball player for the Tampa Bay Rays, born in Cypress, Texas
- James Bonamy, singer
- Bradley Bourgeois, soccer player
- Danielle Bradbery, winner of NBC's The Voice; attended Cypress Ranch High School
- Bryce Callahan, Professional football player on the Denver Broncos
- De'Aaron Fox, professional basketball player; attended Cypress Lakes High School
- Nneka Ogwumike, professional basketball player; attended Cy-Fair Senior High School
- Robbie Grossman, professional baseball player
- Jonathan Horton, Olympic gymnast; grew up and lives in Cypress
- Ryan Kaji, child YouTube star; born in Cypress
- Iris Kyle, ten-time overall Ms. Olympia professional bodybuilder
- Jared Lakind, American-Israeli professional baseball pitcher
- Chiney Ogwumike, American basketball player for the Los Angeles Sparks; went to Cy-Fair Senior High School in Cypress, Texas
- Tony Oller, actor and singer-songwriter; former Disney Channel star; reared in Cypress
- Cat Osterman, American softball player; 2-time medal winning Olympian; attended Cypress Springs High School, in Cypress, Texas.
- Didi Richards, basketball player for the New York Liberty; attended Cypress Ranch High School
- Molly Searcy, American anime voice actress and stage actress
- Fred Whitfield, rodeo cowboy
- Chase McLaughlin, Tampa Bay Buccaneers Kicker; attended Cypress Woods High School
