= Tony Wyllie =

American sports executive

- Born: Hubert Anthony Wyllie; December 31, 1967 (age 58); Brooklyn, New York, U.S.
- Education: Texas Southern University and Rice University
- Occupation: NFL Executive
- Years active: 1991 to present
- Employer: Washington Redskins
- Title: Senior Vice President of Communications
- Awards: 5x Pete Rozelle Award winner
- Website: Tony Wyllie Official Site

Tony Wyllie (born December 31, 1967) is the CEO of The Collective Engine. Prior to this position he was regional president and managing director for Special Olympics North America. He has previously worked as senior vice president of communications for the Washington Redskins of the National Football League (NFL), as well as an executive for the St. Louis Rams, Tennessee Titans, and Houston Texans. He is a five-time recipient of the Pro Football Writers of America Pete Rozelle Award for public relations, and the only executive to receive it for their work on three different teams.

== Early life and education ==
Wyllie was born in Brooklyn, New York and moved to Houston as a child. He attended Cy-Fair High School just outside Houston. Wyllie graduated from Texas Southern University with a degree in journalism, and later earned his MBA from Rice University.

== Career ==
=== Early career ===
While attending Texas Southern University, Wyllie became a game-day intern for the Houston Oilers in 1991. Wyllie's job included public relations tasks, including interacting with the sports journalists in the Houston Oilers press box. In 1992, he became a public relations intern with the San Diego Chargers. In 1993, he then became a public relations intern for the Dallas Cowboys, where he received a Super Bowl ring after the Cowboys' victory in Super Bowl XXVIII. In addition to his work with the NFL, Wyllie was also an intern for the Houston Astros from 1991 to 1992, and was a contributor to the Associated Press, Houston Chronicle, and Houston Post between 1990 and 1992.

=== Los Angeles and St. Louis Rams ===
In 1994 Wyllie replaced David Pearson as the assistant director of public relations for the Los Angeles Rams. He remained with the Rams when the team moved to St. Louis in 1995, becoming the St. Louis Rams. Wyllie was the spokesperson for the Rams during the transition between cities, handling press requests and providing media responses regarding the logistics of the move from Los Angeles to St. Louis. During his tenure with the Rams the team underperformed, so Wyllie's job required him to deal with the negative press surrounding the team's losing record and to promote positive news stories for the struggling franchise. In 1997 Wyllie was awarded the Pete Rozelle award for the top public relations team in the NFL by the Pro Football Writers of America. During his tenure with the Rams he was also chosen by the NFL to work on the public relations for the 1996 and 1997 NFC Championship games. Wyllie stayed with the Rams until 1998.

=== Tennessee Oilers and Titans ===
In 1998 Wyllie became the youngest public relations director in the NFL when he was selected by the Tennessee Oilers as their PR director. He was awarded his second Pete Rozelle award for his work with the team in 2000, after the team had been renamed the Titans. He was also selected by the NFL as the public relations person for the 1999 Pro Bowl. Wyllie stayed with the Titans until 2000, and during his tenure the Titans went to the Super Bowl only to lose to his previous team, the Rams.

=== Houston Texans ===
In 2000 Wyllie left the Titans to become the Vice President of Communications for the Houston Texans during the team's first year of operations. The team would not debut until 2002, so for the first two years Wyllie worked on projects such as revealing the Texans' logo and other organization building activities. During the team's first draft week owner Bob McNair stated that, "This is an opportunity for me to promote the Texans and the city of Houston. It seems [VP/Communications] Tony Wyllie has lined me up for interviews with just about every media outlet in [New York] ... I knew there'd be a lot of interest in the Texans, but I didn't anticipate there'd be this much."

During his tenure with the Texans he was awarded the Pete Rozelle award three more times in 2004, 2007 and 2010, making him the only executive in NFL history to be awarded the prize for his work on three different teams. During this time Wyllie also worked as an adjunct professor at Texas Southern University. In 2010 Wyllie was awarded the Spirit Award from the Houston Association of Black Journalists.

=== Washington Redskins ===
In May 2010 Wyllie became a Senior Vice President with the Washington Redskins, in charge of the communications department. One of the more controversial decisions Wyllie advised Redskins owner Daniel Snyder on was Snyder's libel lawsuit against the Washington City Paper. NBC Sports quoted Wyllie as saying that the move was not done as a part of Wyllie's attempts to manage the team's image, but rather in order to demand better accuracy and responsibility by journalists critical of Snyder. Wyllie's tenure with the team has been marked by his encouragement of Snyder to increase his public and community profile, and to help improve the team's image with its fan base. His job has also involved working directly with each team's upcoming stars on their early career image and injuries, such as Robert Griffin III, as well as with their veteran players. ESPN sports analyst Stephen A. Smith described Wyllie as "one of the best in the business" in terms of public relations executives in the NFL. In 2014 game against the Dallas Cowboys, Wyllie prevented ESPN reporter John Sutcliffe from interviewing the Redskins' quarterback Colt McCoy after Sutcliffe attempted to interview McCoy without prior arrangement. After the event, ESPN did not complain of the outcome, and the NBC stated that Sutcliffe has provoked the situation. Upon his departure in 2019, he was the team’s longest tenured public relations person. Work in the NFL after this included in 2020, Wyllie inducted Isaac Bruce into the NFL Hall of Fame.

=== Super Bowls ===
Over his career Wyllie has been on the public relations team for the NFL for eight different Super Bowls. For example, during Super Bowl XL Wyllie helped players from the competing teams with arranging and executing national interviews.

== Special Olympics North America ==
In 2019, Wyllie left the Washington Team on his own accord to become the regional president and managing director of the Special Olympics North America. The owner of the Redskins Dan Snyder said of his departure that “I’m very proud of this tremendous accomplishment … Tony will always be a member of the Redskins family.” Wyllie is also the founder and CEO of The Collective Engine.

== Boards ==
Wyllie has served on the boards of the Ensemble Theatre in Houston, the March of Dimes, the Management Leadership for Tomorrow-Houston, the John P. McGovern Museum of Health & Medical Science, the Houston Texans YMCA and the Touchdown Club of Houston. He also is on the County Christian School board in Ashburn, VA.

== Personal life ==
Wyllie is a member of the Kappa Alpha Psi and Sigma Pi Phi Fraternities. He is married to his wife Natasha, with whom he has two children, James Anthony and Toni Simone. Texans owner Bob McNair named a race horse after Wyllie, calling the horse "Tony Terrific". He is currently also a professor at the Georgetown University Sports Industry Management faculty. In 2004 Wyllie was awarded Texas Southern University Distinguished Alumni Award. In 2007 Wyllie then received an MBA from Rice University, being sent to the school by Texans owner Bob McNair. Wyllie delivered the Winter Commencement speech to the class of 2013 at his alma mater Texas Southern University on December 13, 2013, and received the Outstanding Alumni Award from that school in 2017. That year he was also inducted into the National Black College Alumni Hall of Fame. In 2020 it was announced that Wyllie was selected by Isaac Bruce to be his presenter into the Football Hall of Fame Wyllie will be the second PR Executive to serve as a Hall of Fame presenter since Gary Wright from the Seahawks in 1995.
