= The Oaks Adventist Christian School =

Coordinates: 29.9741°N 95.6008°W

Houston Adventist Academy
- Cypress, Texas; United States

Information
- Type: Private Seventh Day Adventist Primary and Secondary School
- Motto: Raising the standard of Excellence in service of God and Humanity
- Established: 2003
- Grades: kindergarten^{th} through 12th
- Campus type: Urban
- Colors: Grey, Blue, and Red
- Mascot: Tiger
- Website: www.houaa.org

Houston Adventist Academy, previously known as The Oaks Adventist Christian School, is a private Christian school located in Cypress, an area in unincorporated Harris County, Texas, with PreKindergarten (4 year old) through twelfth grade. It is a part of the Seventh-day Adventist education system, the world's second largest Christian school system.

== History ==
The Oaks Adventist Christian School opened in the fall of 2003.

It was previously in another unincorporated area of Harris County, near Houston.

The school opened its current campus in August 2011.

Plans were in the works to open a daycare facility on the campus in the summer of 2014.

== See also ==
- List of Seventh-day Adventist secondary schools
- Seventh-day Adventist education
