= Initial exchange offering =

Term in cryptocurrency

An Initial exchange offering (IEO) is the cryptocurrency exchange equivalent to a stock launch or Initial public offering (IPO). An IEO is the process of digital asset (e.g. coins or tokens) procurement through an established exchange for the purpose of raising capital for start-up companies. Exchanges act as a middleman between investors and the startup, profiting from fees generated by services rendered during the due diligence process and funding phase. IEOs and initial coin offerings (ICOs) share similar characteristics; however, an IEO can be seen as an evolution from the ICO due to legal influence and an increase in financial regulations within the cryptocurrency market.

== History ==
The first use of an IEO by a major exchange was in January 2019, with the launch of Binance's platform Binance Launchpad.

== Characteristics and risks ==
IEOs allow startups to raise capital through the sale of utility tokens or coins directly on a cryptocurrency exchange. This model aims to reduce investor risk compared to traditional ICOs, as the hosting exchange conducts due diligence and vets the project prior to the token sale. Startups benefit from the exchange's brand reputation and existing user base, which provides access to a larger pool of potential investors. Furthermore, the use of utility tokens can provide mutual benefits by granting investors specific access or privileges within the startup's ecosystem.

Despite the vetting process, the IEO model introduces distinct costs and vulnerabilities. Startups are required to pay listing fees to the exchange for their analytical services, which often includes a predetermined percentage of the total capital raised. Furthermore, the security and quality of exchanges vary widely, meaning poorly regulated platforms may host insecure offerings. The U.S. Securities and Exchange Commission (SEC) has warned that the involvement of an exchange does not eliminate the risk of fraud, and investors remain vulnerable to market manipulation tactics such as pump and dump schemes.

== Procedure ==
A successful IEO must follow specific guidelines during the due diligence stage of IEO selection. Since exchanges use their company brand to promote and invite investors to purchase a startup's token or utility coin, they ensure the project and company are reliable and trustworthy. Platforms that promote new startups analyze and vet the business's white paper, team, business plan, tech, and assess the tokenomics of the business. Exchanges vet and analyze businesses to ensure the plans and projects align with the values of the exchange. This protects the exchange from damaging its reputation and ensures the business is following global legal requirements, such as Anti-Money Laundering Acts for cryptocurrency sales.

== Regulation ==
Following the major rise of IEOs in 2019, many regulatory agencies have not created legal restrictions. The Securities and Exchange Commission commented on IEOs, stating:

"Be cautious if considering an investment in an IEO. Claims of new technologies and financial products, such as those associated with digital asset offerings, and claims that IEOs are vetted by trading platforms, can be used improperly to entice investors with the false promise of high returns in a new investment space. As described below, IEOs may be conducted in violation of the federal securities laws and lack many of the investor protections of registered and exempt securities offerings."

As of 2022, regulation in major industries has been limited, and only a few nations have implemented some level of restriction. Registered national security exchanges and automated trading systems (ATSs) are governed by federal laws and regulations aimed at protecting investors and preventing fraudulent and manipulative trading practices. Several online trading platforms mislead investors into believing that they are registered or meet any of the regulatory requirements for a national securities exchange or an ATS, and so do not provide investors with the investor protections that such exchanges or ATSs provide. By failing to comply with federal securities laws, an IEO and/or trading platform may be operating unlawfully and may not be offering the investors and market protections and remedies these laws are designed to provide. Consider carefully whether the trading platform and the company involved in the IEO have complied with federal securities laws.

== Red flags ==
The following are signs of fraud or illegal behaviour, as stated by the SEC:

1. In the absence of discussion or reference to the U.S. federal securities laws, the IEO and online trading platform should be considered as a red flag.
2. Any offering that declares it will avoid the federal securities laws of the United States by occurring on an overseas trading platform, but nonetheless allows US investors to invest, should be regarded as a red flag.
3. IEOs that claim to be vetted by the trading platforms are a red flag. A security offered in the IEO may violate U.S federal securities laws regardless of whether the trading platform vetted the offering.

Further, the SEC cautioned that there is no such thing as an "SEC-approved IEO."

== Comparison of IEO and ICO ==
ICOs were the first method used by cryptocurrency companies to raise money. Ethereum followed suit in 2014, raising about $18.3 million. Its blockchain project was based on the so-called charitable foundation model, in which investors donate to support the project.

The concepts of IEOs and ICOs may seem similar. During the boom of 2017-2018, ICOs on Ethereum were held daily, resulting in many projects raising millions of dollars, although there were also many dubious and fraudulent offerings on the market. Since ICOs could not be verified, the more reliable concept of IEO gradually emerged based on them. In addition, many ICOs were later found to violate U.S. securities laws, which led to various lawsuits and refunds to investors. There are much greater risks involved in participating in an ICO. Investors must send bitcoin or ether to a smart contract or website and hope they receive tokens. Anyone with a little knowledge of smart contracts and web development skills can create a spectacular website with a promising plan of action and start raising money. Thus, investing in an ICO is considered more risky.
