= Berry Center of Northwest Houston =

Sports complex in Harris County, Texas, United States

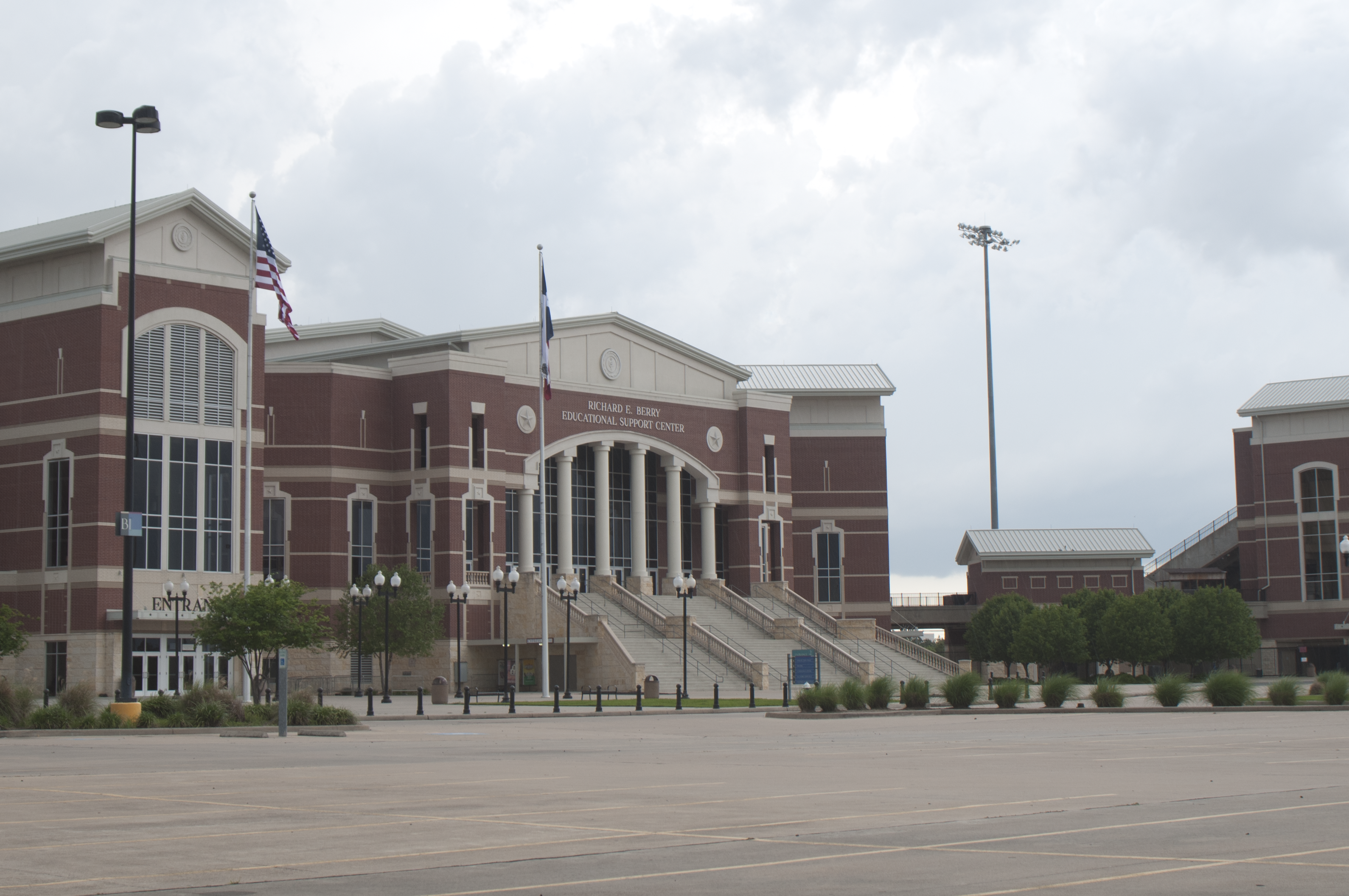
- Interactive map of Berry Center of Northwest Houston
- Location: 8877 Barker Cypress Road; Cypress, Texas 77433
- Coordinates: 29°54′21″N 95°41′19″W
- Owner: Cypress-Fairbanks Independent School District
- Operator: Cypress-Fairbanks Independent School District
- Capacity: 9,500 (arena); 11,000 (outdoor stadium: Cy-Fair FCU Stadium); 490 (theatre)

Construction
- Opened: May 2006
- Cost: $ 84.0 Million
- Architects: PBK Architects and HOK Sport

Tenant
- Texas Copperheads (af2) (2007–2008)

The Berry Center of Northwest Houston (commonly known as Berry Center) is a multi-purpose sports complex located in Cypress, Texas. It was completed in March 2006 and consists of five separate facilities: an arena, stadium, theater, conference center and food production center. It was named after former Cy-Fair ISD superintendent Richard E. Berry. It serves as one of the two football stadiums used by CFISD, the other being Ken Pridgeon Stadium.

Amenities include the 11,000-seat Cy-Fair FCU Stadium used for football and soccer, a 15,333-square-foot (1,424.5 m^{2}) conference center used for staff development able to be partitioned into 17 rooms, a 456-seat auditorium, a multi-purpose arena designed for a maximum capacity of 9,500 people with 8,300 fixed seats, and a floor banquet seating and catering facility to accommodate the preparation and serving of 1,000 meals.

In May 2016, the naming rights to the football stadium, previously known as simply "The Berry Center," were sold to Cy-Fair Federal Credit Union. The stadium was renamed "Cy-Fair FCU Stadium" for $1.5 million, to be paid over the span of 10 years.

== Cy-Fair FCU Stadium ==
Cy-Fair FCU stadium hosts football, soccer, and band competitions. It was known as the Berry Center until 2016.

== Events ==
TobyMac recorded and filmed the Grammy award-winning live album Alive and Transported in the arena.

The Newsboys recorded and filmed the live album Houston We Are GO there.

The Berry Center hosted auditions for season 7 of American Ninja Warrior.

Rick Perry held a campaign rally in the arena during the 2010 Texas governor race.

The Berry Center hosted the State Farm College Slam Dunk and 3-Point Championships in 2016.

2017 UIL Texas State High School Wrestling Championship

Cypress Fairbanks Independent School District High School Graduations

2020 UIL Texas State High School Wrestling Championship
