= Kirksey Architecture =

Kirksey LEED EB Headquarters in Houston, Texas

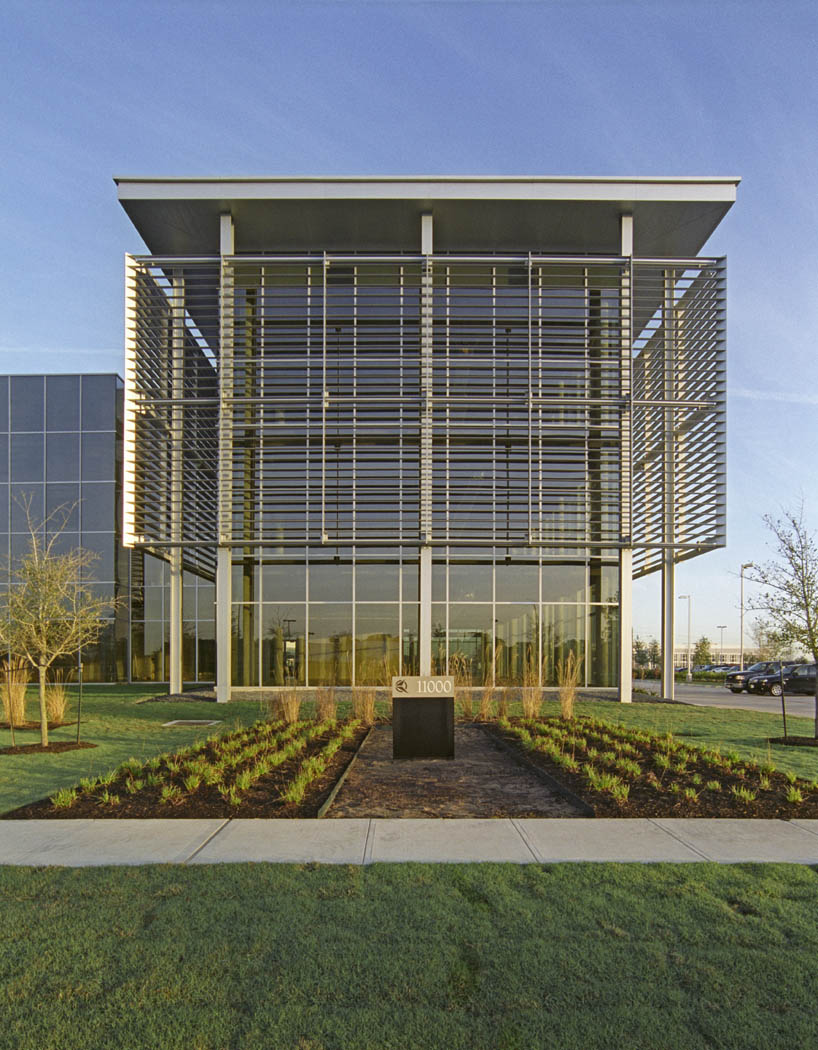
The Satterfield & Pontikes' building earned the first LEED Gold rating in Houston

Founded in 1971, Kirksey Architecture began as a small commercial architecture firm and today has evolved into a diverse organization of 12 specialized and practiced groups, each focusing on a particular business segment. Kirksey is headquartered in Houston, Texas on a LEED certified corporate campus.

Kirksey specializes in designing health-conscious buildings. This was formalized through the creation of the EcoServices team, a private think-tank and consulting group whose focus is to mainstream environmentally friendly building practices. The team educates other firm members and the community on green building practices. A basicGREEN program was developed that prescribes sustainable design measures to be implemented on every project, regardless of LEED Certification and at no added cost to the project.

Kirksey currently has over 27,000,000 sq ft (2,500,000 m^{2}) of LEED projects certified or underway, and has designed many of Houston's first LEED buildings including:

- 1st LEED certified building in Houston (Silver, New Construction)
- 1st LEED CI in Houston (Silver, Commercial Interiors)
- 1st LEED EB in Texas (Existing Building, our own corporate headquarters)
- 1st LEED CS (Core and Shell), which is also the 1st Gold certified building, in Houston

Kirksey retrofitted their building to become the first LEED EB (existing building) certified in Texas as well as operating internally as a green company for many years through recycling efforts, tree planting, green cleaning programs, and alternative transportation incentives for employees.

== Notable Kirksey projects ==
Memorial Hermann Medical Plaza in the Texas Medical Center

- Kirksey Headquarters, Houston, Texas – LEED for Existing Buildings
- SpawGlass Construction Corporation, Houston, Texas – LEED Silver for New Construction
- American Heart Association, Houston, Texas – LEED Certified for New Construction
- Satterfield and Pontikes Headquarters, Houston, Texas – LEED Gold for Core and Shell
- DNA Westway I, Houston, Texas – LEED Gold for Core and Shell
- HealthSouth Medical Center, "Digital Hospital", Birmingham, Alabama
- Palisade Palms, Galveston, Texas
- University of Texas Health Science Center, South Texas Research Facility, San Antonio, Texas
- University of Houston, Calhoun Lofts, Houston, Texas
- Texas A&M University, Agriculture Headquarters Building, College Station, Texas
- The Houstonian Hotel, Club & Spa, Houston, Texas
- Memorial Hermann Medical Plaza, Houston, Texas
- Texas Woman’s University, Houston, Texas
- Tellepsen Downtown Family YMCA, Houston, Texas
- Astrodome Parking Project, Houston, Texas

== Awards ==
Texas Woman's University won many awards including interior design awards from IIDA and ASID

- #1 Largest Houston-Area Green Architect, Houston Business Journal, 2010
- Houston Business Journal’s Landmark Award for the University of Houston Calhoun Lofts and CITYCENTRE (The Lofts), 2010
- ASID Design Award, First Place: Hospitality/Restaurant for FiveSeven Grille, 2009
- IIDA Design Excellence Award - Small Corporate for Central Houston Offices, 2009
- Houston Business Journal’s Landmark Award for Yellowstone Academy and Texas Southern University's School of Public Affairs, 2009
- Texas Construction Magazine's Best of 09', Best of Office Projects for Friedkin Companies Campus, 2009
- Houston Business Journal’s Fast 100 Enterprise Champion, 2008
- Mayor’s Proud Partner Award, 2008
- Greater Houston Partnership, 2008 Quality of Life Visionary Green Building Award
- Houston Business Journal, Houston’s Best Places to Work, 150-500 employees, 2008
- USGBC Outstanding Environmental Team for SYSCO, 2008
- Texas Construction Magazine's Best of 08’, Award of Excellence Higher Education for Houston Community College Learning Hub & Science Center, 2008
- Texas Construction Magazine's Best of 08’, Best of Office/Corporate for Granite Westchase II, 2008
- Greater Houston Partnership’s Houston’s Greatest Mid-Size Company, 2007
- TSA Design Award, Commercial New Construction, 2007
- IIDA Design Excellence Award - Institutional/Education, 2007
- AIA Houston Chapter, Award: Interiors, 2007
- AIA Houston Chapter, Honor Award: Architecture, 2007
- American Subcontractor’s Association, Houston Chapter, A/E Firm of the Year, 2007
