= Ken Pridgeon Stadium =

Outdoor American football stadium in Houston, Texas

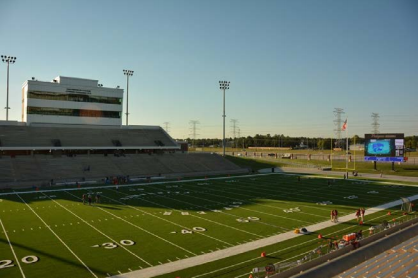
- Pridgeon Stadium before a game in 2016.
- Interactive map of Ken Pridgeon Stadium
- Location: 12550 Windfern Rd. A, Houston, TX 77064
- Coordinates: 29°56′8.73″N 95°34′11.76″W
- Owner: Cypress-Fairbanks Independent School District
- Operator: Cypress-Fairbanks Independent School District
- Capacity: 12,000

Construction
- Opened: 1977

Ken Pridgeon Stadium is an outdoor American football stadium located in Houston, Texas. The stadium was built in 1977 and, along with Cy-Fair FCU Stadium, and serves as the home field for some Cypress-Fairbanks Independent School District varsity football games and soccer games. Cy-Fair ISD Stadium was renamed Ken Pridgeon Stadium in 1994, in honor of Oran Kenneth Pridgeon, who served as Cy-Fair ISD Athletic Director from 1967 to 1998.

In May 2014, as part of a US$1.2 billion bond referendum, the stadium received $40 million for upgrades and renovations that were scheduled to be completed in two parts. Some of the earlier renovations included parking lot upgrades, concrete replacements, the addition of LED lighting, as well as improvements to the stadium's sewage system. The renovations were completed between December 2016 and January 2017, which included a new natatorium expected to seat 950 people, a new two-story press box, new ticket booths, restrooms, concessions stand, and an elevator that goes up to the press box. Pridgeon Stadium is the Oldest American football stadium in the Cypress-Fairbanks Independent School District aside from Cy-Fair FCU Stadium
