= PBK Architects =

PBK Inc.
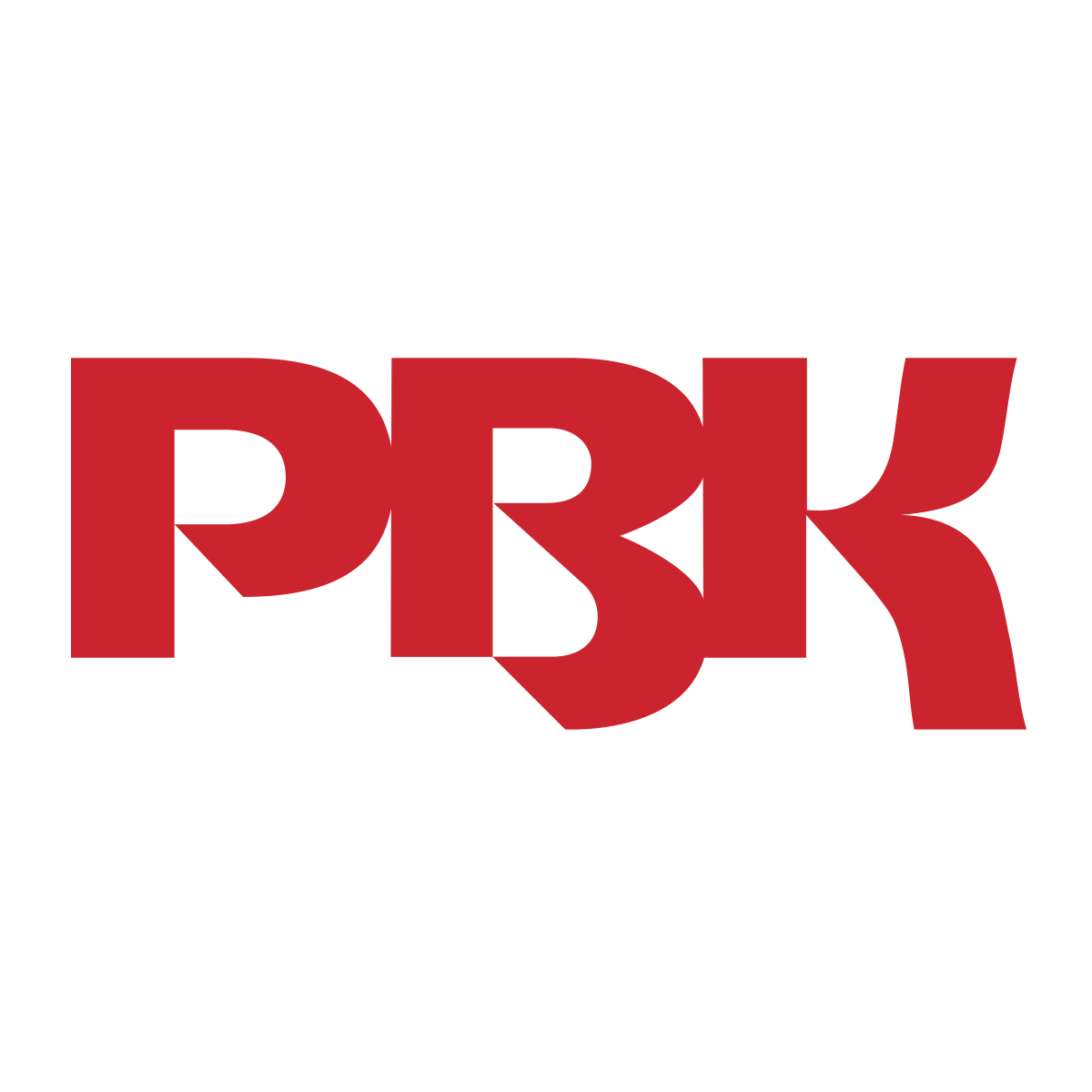

Practice information
- Founded: 1981
- Location: 11 Greenway Plaza; Houston, Texas

Significant works and honors
- Buildings: Leonard E. Merrell Center; Richard E. Berry Educational Support Center (with HOK Sport)

Website
- pbk.com

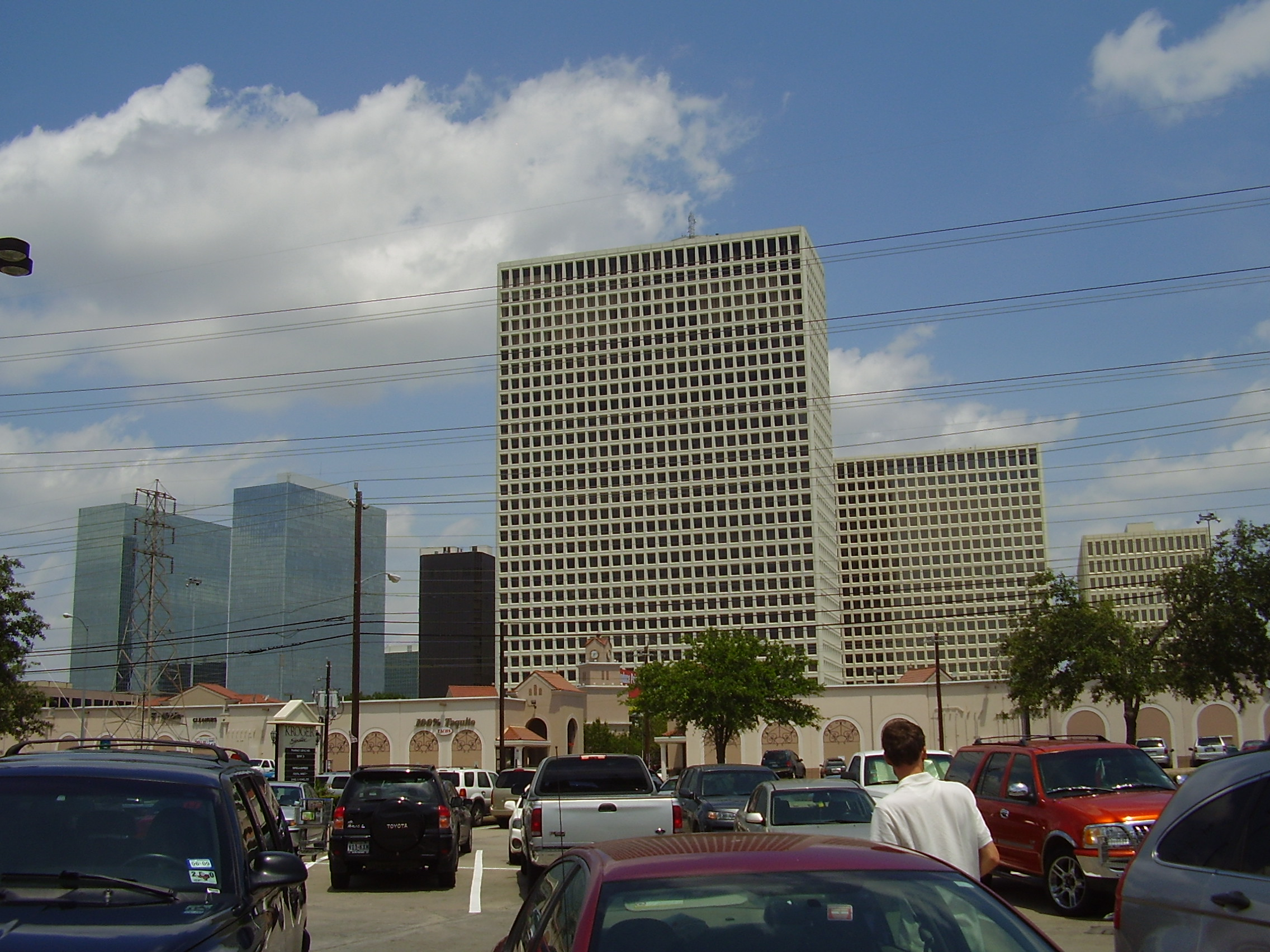
Greenway Plaza, which has the PBK headquarters

PBK is a full-service architectural planning and design firm headquartered in Houston, Texas. The firm provides services related to architecture, engineering, interior design, planning, technology and facilities consulting. The firm also specializes in educational architecture, sports, healthcare, corporate and municipal facilities.

== History ==
PBK Architects is an American architectural planning and design firm headquartered in Houston, Texas. The firm was founded in 1981 by architect Dan Boggio, AIA, LEED AP BD+C, who continues to serve as its Executive Chairman. From its inception, PBK established a multidisciplinary practice offering architecture, engineering, interior design, planning, and facilities consulting services. Over time, the firm expanded to dozens of offices across the United States, becoming one of the largest architecture and engineering firms in the region.

PBK is particularly recognized for its extensive contributions to educational architecture, with a long-standing focus on K–12 and higher education facilities. Beginning in the 1980s and 1990s, the firm developed a reputation for designing large-scale public school campuses that integrated safety, flexibility, biophilic design, and community use. Its work helped pioneer concepts such as multi-campus "education villages", which combine multiple grade levels and shared resources within a single, cohesive site plan.

Throughout the 2000s and 2010s, PBK expanded its educational portfolio nationally, delivering elementary schools, middle schools, high schools, career and technical education (CTE) centers, and university buildings. The firm became known for research-driven design approaches that support evolving "next and best" teaching methodologies, daylighting strategies, building resiliency, adaptable learning environments, and student-centered campus planning.

In addition to education, PBK works across sectors including sports, healthcare, civic, and municipal architecture; however, educational facilities remain central to its identity and growth. By the early 2020s, industry rankings regularly cited PBK as a leading firm in the education market sector, reflecting decades of sustained influence on the planning and design of learning environments in the United States.

== Notable PBK Buildings ==
- Atascocita High School
- Richard E. Berry Educational Support Center
- John Paul Stevens High School
- McKinney Boyd High School
- Leonard E. Merrell Center
- Tompkins High School
