= Science Olympiad Foundation =

Educational foundation in India

Science Olympiad Foundation (SOF)
- The logo of the organization
- Abbreviation: SOF
- Formation: 1998; 28 years ago
- Founder: Mr. Mahabir Singh
- Type: Non-profit
- Legal status: Foundation
- Purpose: Education
- Headquarters: Gurugram, Haryana, India
- Region served: North India
- Services: Education
- Official language: English
- Secretary General: Mahabir Singh (Director)
- Affiliations: British Council, Techfest, TCS Star Sports (formerly), National University of Singapore, Wipro
- Website: sofworld.org

Science Olympiad Foundation (SOF) is an educational foundation established in 1998, based in New Delhi, India which promotes science, mathematics, general knowledge, introductory computer education and English language skills among school children in India and many other countries through various Olympiads. However, they are not the official organizer of Olympiads in India.

== Olympiads ==
Every year over 91000+ schools from 70+ countries register for the 8 Olympiad exams and millions of students appear in them.

=== Current ===
Annually, about 5 million students take part in each of the following Olympiad exams:

- International Computer Science Olympiad (ICSO) is a single level exam. It was the second Olympiad conducted by SOF. It has been conducted since 2000. Students from class I-X may participate in the examination.
- International Science Olympiad (ISO) is conducted at two levels each year. It was the first Olympiad conducted by SOF. It has been conducted since 1998. Students from class I-XII may participate in the examination.The name of the Olympiad was changed from "National Science Olympiad (NSO)" to "International Science Olympiad (ISO)" in 2026.
- International Mathematics Olympiad (IMO) is conducted at two levels each year. Students from class I-XII may participate in the examination.
- International English Olympiad (IEO) used to be a single level exam each year, but since 2017–2018 it is conducted at two levels. Students from class I-XII can participate in this Olympiad.
- International General Knowledge Olympiad (IGKO) is a single level exam. Students from classes I-X may participate in the examination. This Olympiad was introduced in the 2017–2018 academic session.
- International Commerce Olympiad (ICO) is a single level exam. Students from classes XI and XII may participate in the examination. It is conducted in partnership with ICSI. Under The Ministry of Corporate Affairs.
- SOF International Social Studies Olympiad (ISSO) is a single level exam. Students from classes III-X may participate in the examination.
- SOF International Hindi Olympiad (IHO) is a single level exam. Students from classes III-X may participate in the examination.

=== Former ===
- National Cyber Olympiad Level-2 (NCO) was formerly a two-level exam, but it has been converted to a single level exam since 2017–18.
- International Sports Knowledge Olympiad (ISKO) was conducted only once, during the 2016–2017 session. It was a single level exam conducted in partnership with Star Sports in which students of classes 1 to 10 could participate.

== Eligibility and pattern ==
For Level 1:

Students from classes 1 through 12 can participate. The exams consist of 35 multiple choice questions of 40 marks for classes I to IV, and 50 multiple choice questions for classes V to XII of 60 marks, to be answered in one hour. Five questions that are part of the 'Achievers' section' carry three marks (and for primary classes excluding 5th, it has only two marks) each whereas the remaining questions carry one mark each. Students are required to mark their answers on an OMR sheet. Results are announced for every student and they include the student's international rank, regional rank (since 2020-21), zonal rank, city rank and school rank and winners are awarded with cash prizes, medals, trophies, gift certificates and Merit Certificates. SOF also generates a performance report for all participating students and schools, as well as awards teachers and principals whose pupils excelled in the exam. SOF also runs 3 scholarship Schemes for under privileged girl students, for students from defence and internal security families and for academically brilliant students.

For Level 2:

If fulfilled the eligibility criteria, students participated in the Level 1 olympiads of NSO, IMO, IEO qualify for the Level 2 conducted at various centres in India.

== Controversies ==
Although being a non-governmental organisation it works on a profit-making model and charges heavily for its books and study materials. Silver Zone Foundation, a similar 24-year-old Olympiad company, rakes in 50% of its revenues from book sales and the rest from exam registration fees (at Rs 120 per student). Close to a million kids from 5,000 schools have been sitting their Olympiads every year, claims CEO Kamal Kishore.

Questions are deliberately asked from their own books which are not according to state prescribed board syllabi which compel students to buy their expensive books.

The foundation has been criticized by Anwesh Mazumdar, national coordinator, Science Olympiads from the academics at Homi Bhabha Centre for Science Education saying, "It is a misrepresentation to call a competition an Olympiad if it has no culmination on the international stage." He argues that the original science Olympiads — the first was in Maths held in Romania in 1959 — pursue nobler goals of intellectual inquiry. "These companies should not call it an 'Olympiad'; call it a competition if necessary. For example, the International Mathematical Olympiad is the real deal, but Science Olympiad Foundation, a private organisation, has an exam called the International Mathematics Olympiad, parents are misled and even the international organisers are concerned," says Mazumdar, adding that they have contemplated patenting the name.

There have been demands for government intervention to regulate the exams. Ashok Pandey, director at Ahlcon International School in Delhi, admits that private Olympiads need to be better regulated. "I had initially decided not to host them, but gave in when parents insisted," says Pandey.
