= Cypress-Fairbanks Independent School District =

School district in Texas, United States

Address
- 11440 Matzke Road Cypress, Texas, 77429; United States

District information
- Type: Public
- Grades: Pre-K - 12
- Established: December 1939; 86 years ago
- Superintendent: Douglas Killian
- NCES District ID: 4816110

Students and staff
- Enrollment: 114,881 (2020–2021)
- Faculty: 7,659.35 (on an FTE basis)

Other information
- Website: www.cfisd.net

The Cypress-Fairbanks Independent School District (CFISD, often referred to as Cy-Fair) is an independent school district with its headquarters in Cypress, Texas, United States. Cy-Fair ISD is the largest Recognized school district in the state of Texas with 75 out of 78 campuses receiving an 'Exemplary' or 'Recognized' rating by the Texas Education Agency in 2010.

The district covers a small portion of Houston (including the Fairbanks section), the city of Jersey Village, and other unincorporated areas in Harris County (including Cypress). The district covers 186 square miles (480 km^{2}) of land.

Cypress-Fairbanks ISD is part of the taxation base for Lone Star College System (formerly North Harris Montgomery Community College District).

In August 2023, the district had 95 general-purpose campuses (fifty-eight elementary schools, twenty middle schools, thirteen high schools, and four special program facilities).

== History ==
The first official classes in the area were held in a church. However, in 1884, local residents built a one-room house on donated land. In 1939, an election was held in which voters in the Cypress and Fairbanks school systems approved the creation of the Cypress-Fairbanks Consolidated School District; the measure passed by a vote of 129-66 in Cypress and 90-87 in Fairbanks.

The two individuals most frequently credited for the creation of Cypress-Fairbanks Consolidated School District (CSD was changed to ISD in the early 1960s) were Trustee J. F. Bane, of the Fairbanks school system, and Superintendent E. A. Millsap (1932–1942), of the Cypress school system.

Since 2006, Children at Risk, a non-profit organization based in Houston, publishes its "Annual School Rankings" which ranks Houston metropolitan area schools using a formula going beyond the state’s school accountability system, using traditional indicators such as whether students passed state exams, drop-out and graduation rates along with less commonly used indicators such as counseling and poverty intervention. In 2012, Children at Risk evaluated and ranked 150 high schools in the greater Houston area and 8 CyFair-ISD high schools (out of a total of 10) appeared in the rankings. Additionally, Cypress Ridge High School ranked fifth among Greater Houston’s Best Urban, Comprehensive High Schools.

During the wake of the Uvalde school shooting in 2022, Texan schools were all told to assess security measures for the protection of students, teachers, and staff in schools. In response to this, CFISD did so by adding bullet resistant glass, man traps, lock-down buttons, intruder locks for classroom doors, walls to schools that were previously open-concept, and signs that remind people to not leave their doors open for many of their schools.

In 2022 the district began requiring parental permission for students to check books out of school libraries.

== Statistics ==
By the 2006-2007 school year, the district was the third largest in Texas with more than 70 campuses and 100,603 students.

In the 2010-2011 school year the district had over 106,000 students. Of them, 42.5% were Hispanic, 31% were White, 15.5% were Black, 8% were Asian, and others included Native Americans and people of two or more races.

In the 2017-2018 school year, district enrollment reached 116,138 students.

== Transportation ==
In 2009, in the midst of budget deficits caused by decreased state funding, the board voted to only have school bus services for a resident who lives more than two miles from his or her school, as opposed to having service for residents living more than one mile away. Activity (late) bus service was also discontinued for most CFISD schools. Bus service continued and was expanded to accommodate student mothers, delivering mothers and their children to schools and district funded daycares on campus. If a student has to cross a major street then bus service is available even if the student lives within 2 miles of the school. Starting in the beginning of 2013-2014 school year, activity (late) bus service are back for most CFISD schools and in the 2014 CFISD Bond, the board voted to bring back school bus services for residents living more than one mile away starting in the 2014-2015 school year.

== Schools ==
=== High schools ===
The district has 12 high schools. Eleven are located in unincorporated Harris County, and one in Jersey Village.

- Cy-Fair High School (opened 1940)
- Jersey Village High School (opened 1972)
- Cypress Creek High School (opened 1977)
- Langham Creek High School (opened 1984)
- Cypress Falls High School (opened 1992)
- Cypress Springs High School (opened 1997)
- Cypress Ridge High School (opened 2002)
- Cypress Woods High School (opened 2006)
- Cypress Ranch High School (opened 2008)
- Cypress Lakes High School (opened 2008)
- Cypress Park High School (opened 2016)
- Bridgeland High School (opened 2017)
- The Wood Academy (opened 2026)

=== Middle schools ===
- Anthony Middle School
- Aragon Middle School
- Arnold Middle School - National Blue Ribbon School in 1990-91 and 1997–98
- Bleyl Middle School - National Blue Ribbon School in 1983-84 and 1990–91
- Campbell Middle School
- ]https://cook.cfisd.net/ Cook Middle School]
- Dean Middle School (Houston)
- Goodson Middle School
- Hamilton Middle School
- Hopper Middle School
- Kahla Middle School
- Labay Middle School - National Blue Ribbon School in 1988–89, 1992–93, and 1997–98
- Rowe Middle School
- Salyards Middle School
- Smith Middle School
- Spillane Middle School
- Sprague Middle School
- Thornton Middle School - National Blue Ribbon School in 1999–2000
- Truitt Middle School
- Watkins Middle School - National Blue Ribbon School in 2001–02

=== Elementary schools ===
- Adam Elementary School
- André Elementary School
- Ault Elementary School
- Bane Elementary School (Houston)
- Bang Elementary School
- Birkes Elementary School
- Black Elementary School
- Brosnahan Elementary School
- Byrd Elementary School
- Copeland Elementary School
- Danish Elementary School
- Duryea Elementary School
- Emery Elementary School
- Emmott Elementary School
- Farney Elementary School
- Fiest Elementary School - National Blue Ribbon School in 1993-94
- Elementary School - National Blue Ribbon School in 1991–92
- Frazier Elementary School
- Gleason Elementary School
- Hairgrove Elementary School
- Hamilton Elementary School
- Hancock Elementary School
- Hemmenway Elementary School
- Holbrook Elementary School (Houston)
- Elementary School
- Hoover Elementary School
- Horne Elementary School
- Jowell Elementary School
- Keith Elementary School
- Kirk Elementary School
- Lamkin Elementary School
- Lee Elementary School
- Lieder Elementary School
- Lowery Elementary School - National Blue Ribbon School in 1991–92
- Matzke Elementary School
- McFee Elementary School
- McGown Elementary School
- Metcalf Elementary School
- Millsap Elementary School
- Moore Elementary School
- Owens Elementary School - National Blue Ribbon School in 1998–99
- Pope Elementary School
- Post Elementary School (Jersey Village)
- Postma Elementary School
- Reed Elementary School
- Rennell Elementary School
- A. Robison Elementary School
- M. Robinson Elementary School
- Sampson Elementary School
- Sheridan Elementary School
- Swenke Elementary School
- Tipps Elementary School
- Walker Elementary School
- Warner Elementary School
- Wells Elementary School
- Willbern Elementary School
- Wilson Elementary School
- Woodard Elementary School
- Yeager Elementary School

== Other Facilities ==
In 2023, the district administrative departments moved to a new headquarters building located in Cypress. Known as the Mark Henry, Ed.D. Administration Building (MHAB), it is named for a previous district superintendent who retired at the end of 2023 after twelve years in the role.

The previous district headquarters was in northwest unincorporated Harris County. It was the 136,000-square-foot (12,600 m^{2}) Instructional Support Center (ISC), a former shopping center that was previously owned by the Federal Deposit Insurance Corporation (FDIC). The district purchased it for $1.4 million, then renovated 123,000 square feet (11,400 m^{2}) of the facility. The district spent $9 million to build its previous headquarters on Windfern Road, which opened in 1978.

- Berry Center of Northwest Houston
- Ken Pridgeon Stadium
- Carlton Center
- Brautigam Center

== See also ==
- List of school districts in Texas
