= Cypress Ridge High School =

Public school in Texas, United States

Location
- 7900 N. Eldridge Parkway; Houston, TX 77041; United States; 29.8925°N 95.6049°W

Information
- Type: Public high school
- Established: 2002
- School district: Cypress-Fairbanks Independent School District
- Principal: Abe Lozano
- Faculty: 244.94 FTE
- Grades: 9-12
- Enrollment: 2,891 (2023-2024)
- Student to teacher ratio: 11.80
- Colors: Forest green, navy, and white
- Athletics: UIL 6A
- Athletics conference: University Interscholastic League
- Team name: Rams
- Website: cyridge.cfisd.net

Cypress Ridge High School is a public secondary school located in unincorporated Harris County, Texas, near Houston. It was established in 2002 as Cypress-Fairbanks Independent School District High School #7. Cypress Ridge provides the deaf education program for Cy Fair ISD and surrounding school districts.

It serves Lakes on Eldridge.

== History ==
In 2016 a section of the Jersey Village High School attendance boundary was reassigned to Cypress Ridge. This occurred as part of a wave of high school rezoning.

== Academics ==
For the 2018–2019 school year, the school received a B grade from the Texas Education Agency, with an overall score of 88 out of 100. The school received a B grade in each of the three performance domains, with a score of 88 for Student Achievement, 87 for School Progress, and 87 for Closing the Gaps. The school received four of the seven possible distinction designations for Academic Achievement in Mathematics, Academic Achievement in English Language Arts/Reading, Post-Secondary Readiness, and Top 25%: Comparative Closing the Gaps.

== Feeder patterns ==
Schools that feed into Cypress Ridge include:

- Elementary schools: Bane, Emmott, Kirk, Bang (partial), Francone (partial), Hairgrove (partial), Holbrook (partial), Lee (partial), Post (partial), Willbern (partial)
- Middle schools: Campbell (partial), Dean (partial), Truitt (partial)

== Notable alumni ==
- Kovid Gupta, author of Kingdom of The Soap Queen: The Story of Balaji Telefilms
- Awsten Knight, lead singer of Waterparks
- Russell Shepard, former NFL Wide Receiver
- Willie Wright, former NFL offensive guard for the Cleveland Browns and Atlanta Falcons
