= Cypress Springs High School =

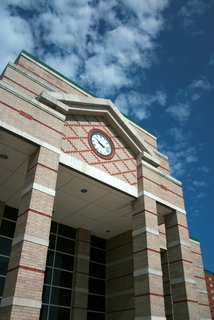

Location
- 7909 Fry Rd; Cypress, TX 77433; United States; 29.892327°N 95.7199994°W

Information
- Type: Public high school
- Motto: All day, Every day!
- Established: 1997
- School district: Cypress-Fairbanks Independent School District
- Principal: Plas Williams Jr.
- Faculty: 188.84 FTE
- Grades: 9-12
- Enrollment: 2,800 (2024–2025)
- Student to teacher ratio: 14.83
- Colors: Navy, red, and white
- Athletics: UIL 6A
- Athletics conference: University Interscholastic League
- Team name: Panthers
- Website: cysprings.cfisd.net

Cypress Springs High School, CSHS, or more commonly as Cy-Springs is located at 7909 Fry Road, in Cypress, an unincorporated community in Harris County, Texas.

Cypress Springs High School was established in 1997, making it the sixth high school within Cypress Fairbanks Independent School District to open its doors to students in the Cypress and Katy areas.

== History ==
The school first opened in 1997, becoming the sixth school in CFISD. The graduating class of 2008 was Cypress Springs' largest senior class with more than 1,000 students walking the stage at the Richard E. Berry Educational Support Center to receive their diplomas.

In the 2005–2006 school year, attendance at this high school reached more than 4,000 students due to the building boom taking place in the local area, making for a crowded school and crowded hallways.

In 2017, a team of school staff made an appearance on the second episode of the American cooking reality show The F Word under the name “School Pride” where they won against “The Cooking Cubans.”

== Academics ==
Each year, the Texas Education Agency assigns schools a score from 0 to 100 and a grade based on academic data. The school received a score of 80 in 2017–18, 83 in 2018–19, and 80 in 2021–22.

== Demographics ==
As of Oct. 31, 2025, the demographic breakdown of the 2,573 students enrolled was:

- Hispanic: 45.28%
- African American: 37.78%
- White: 6.84%
- Asian: 5.95%
- Native American: 0.39%
- Multi Race: 3.65%
- Pacific Islander: 0.12%

In the school year 2025-2026, 69.02% of students were on free/reduced lunch.

== Feeder Patterns ==
Schools that feed into Cypress Springs include:

- Elementary schools: Duryea, André (partial), Copeland (partial), Hoover/Jowell (partial), McFee (partial), Postma (partial)
- Middle schools: Hopper, Anthony (partial), Kahla (partial)

== Notable Alumni ==
- Taye Barber - National Football League (NFL) wide receiver
- Lawson Craddock - Pro Track and Road Racing Cyclist
- Kimberlyn Duncan - 2013 American 200m Champion Track & Field
- Courtney Enders - NHRA Super Stock Driver
- Erica Enders - NHRA Pro Stock Driver
- Derrick Lewis - UFC fighter
- Phillip McDonald - Professional Basketball Player
- Leon O'Neal Jr. - Professional Football Player
- Cat Osterman - Olympic Gold Medalist in Women's Softball
