= Patrick Paul =

American football player (born 2001)

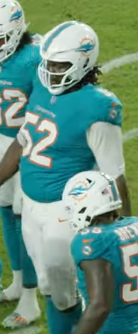
- Paul with the Miami Dolphins in 2024

No. 52 – Miami Dolphins
- Position: Offensive tackle
- Roster status: Active

Personal information
- Born: November 1, 2001 (age 25); Houston, Texas, U.S.
- Listed height: 6 ft 7 in (2.01 m)
- Listed weight: 325 lb (147 kg)

Career information
- High school: Jersey Village (Jersey Village, Texas)
- College: Houston (2019–2023)
- NFL draft: 2024: 2nd round, 55th overall pick

Career history
- Miami Dolphins (2024–present)

Awards and highlights
- First-team All-Big 12 (2023); 2× first-team All-AAC (2021, 2022)

Career NFL statistics as of Week 16, 2025
- Games played: 32
- Games started: 18
- Stats at Pro Football Reference

Patrick Martin Paul (born November 1, 2001) is an American professional football offensive tackle for the Miami Dolphins of the National Football League (NFL). Paul played college football at Houston and was selected by the Miami Dolphins in the second round of 2024 NFL draft. He is the grandson of the former Nigerian president Johnson Aguiyi-Ironsi and the younger brother of NFL guard Chris Paul.

== Early life ==
Paul was born on November 1, 2001, in Houston, Texas. He lived with his family in Nigeria, his parents' homeland, for two and a half years before moving back to Houston. Paul attended Jersey Village High School, spending his sophomore year at Cypress Creek High School. Paul was rated a three-star recruit and committed to play college football at Houston.

== College career ==
Paul redshirted his true freshman season with the Houston Cougars, but did start the final three games of the season. He started the first two games of his redshirt freshman season before it was ended by a foot injury. Paul started all 14 of the Cougars' games at left tackle in 2021 and was named first team All-American Athletic Conference. He repeated as a first team All-AAC selection as a redshirt sophomore. Paul considered entering the 2023 NFL draft, but ultimately decided to return to Houston for the 2023 season.

== Professional career ==
Pre-draft measurables
Height	Weight	Arm length	Hand span	Wingspan	40-yard dash	10-yard split	20-yard split	20-yard shuttle	Three-cone drill	Vertical jump	Bench press
6 ft 7 1/2 in (2.02 m)	331 lb (150 kg)	36 1/4 in (0.92 m)	9 3/8 in (0.24 m)	7 ft 2 1/4 in (2.19 m)	5.13 s	1.77 s	2.97 s	4.71 s	7.65 s	29.0 in (0.74 m)	30 reps
All values from NFL Combine/Pro Day

Paul was selected by the Miami Dolphins in the second round (55th overall) of 2024 NFL draft. Paul signed his four-year rookie contract on June 11, 2024.

== Personal life ==
Paul's grandfather is Johnson Aguiyi-Ironsi, who served as the President of Nigeria in 1966 before being assassinated. His older brother Chris played offensive tackle at Tulsa and was drafted by the Washington Commanders in the seventh round of the 2022 NFL draft.
