= Chris Paul (offensive lineman) =

American football player (born 1998)

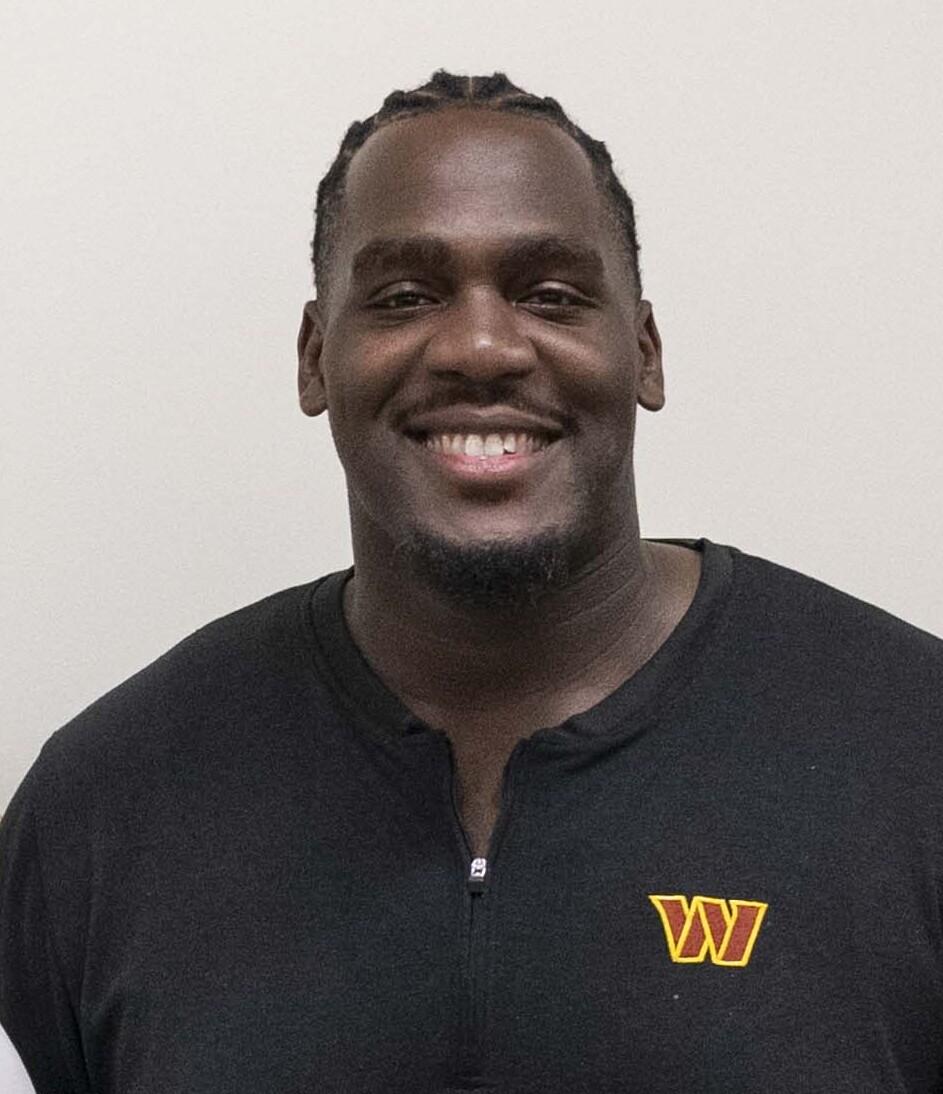
- Paul with the Washington Commanders in 2024

No. 75 – Washington Commanders
- Position: Guard
- Roster status: Active

Personal information
- Born: November 19, 1998 (age 27); Houston, Texas, U.S.
- Listed height: 6 ft 4 in (1.93 m)
- Listed weight: 324 lb (147 kg)

Career information
- High school: Jersey Village (Jersey Village, Texas)
- College: Tulsa (2017–2021)
- NFL draft: 2022: 7th round, 230th overall pick

Career history
- Washington Commanders (2022–present)

Career NFL statistics as of 2025
- Games played: 34
- Games started: 23
- Stats at Pro Football Reference

Christopher Kelechi Paul (born November 19, 1998) is an American professional football guard for the Washington Commanders of the National Football League (NFL). He played college football for the Tulsa Golden Hurricane and was drafted by the Commanders in the seventh round of the 2022 NFL draft. Paul is the grandson of the former Nigerian president Johnson Aguiyi-Ironsi and the older brother of NFL offensive tackle Patrick Paul. He has released R&B music under the stage name The Seventh.

== Early life ==
Paul was ranked as a two–star recruit by 247Sports coming out of Jersey Village High School in Jersey Village, Texas. He enrolled at The University of Tulsa in 2017 and played for the Tulsa Golden Hurricane football team, graduating with a bachelor's degree in computer information systems in May 2021. Paul played in the 2022 Senior Bowl for the American team.

== Professional career ==
Pre-draft measurables
Height	Weight	Arm length	Hand span	Wingspan	40-yard dash	10-yard split	20-yard split	20-yard shuttle	Three-cone drill	Vertical jump	Broad jump	Bench press
6 ft 3 7/8 in (1.93 m)	323 lb (147 kg)	33 5/8 in (0.85 m)	9 3/8 in (0.24 m)	6 ft 9 5/8 in (2.07 m)	4.89 s	1.71 s	2.84 s	4.83 s	7.74 s	27.0 in (0.69 m)	9 ft 1 in (2.77 m)	26 reps
All values from NFL Combine/Pro Day

Paul was selected by the Washington Commanders in the seventh round (230th overall) of the 2022 NFL draft and signed his four-year rookie contract on May 6, 2022. He made his first career start in the final game of his rookie season.

In the 2023 offseason, Paul lost out to Saahdiq Charles for the starting left guard position. After Charles was placed on injured reserve, Paul took over as starter in Week 8.

Starting in Week 3 of the 2025 season, the Commanders named Paul as the starting left guard replacing Brandon Coleman who started the first two games of the season. He played in all 17 games of the regular season, including 15 starts at left guard.

On March 19, 2026, Paul re-signed with Commanders on a one-year, $3 million contract. He was named the starting left guard again before the start of the 2026 season. In the last play before half-time in the Week 2 game against the Dallas Cowboys, Paul stepped on the foot of quarterback Jayden Daniels as he was attempting to drop-back and fell to the ground. This resulted in Daniels dislocating his left elbow after attempting to brace himself from the fall. In the Monday Night Football matchup against the San Francisco 49ers, Commanders running back Jeremy McNichols scored a 31-yard rushing touchdown in the fourth quarter with less than five minutes remaining in the game that tied the score at 23–23 with a possibility to take the lead with the extra point. The touchdown was called back due to Paul committing a facemask penalty and the game resulted in a 23–17 loss.

== Personal life ==
Paul's grandfather is Johnson Aguiyi-Ironsi, who served as the President of Nigeria in 1966 before being assassinated. His younger brother Patrick was selected by the Miami Dolphins in the second round of 2024 NFL draft. Paul has released R&B music under the stage name The Seventh.
