= Cheeseburger in Paradise (restaurant) =

Casual dining restaurant chain (2002–2020)

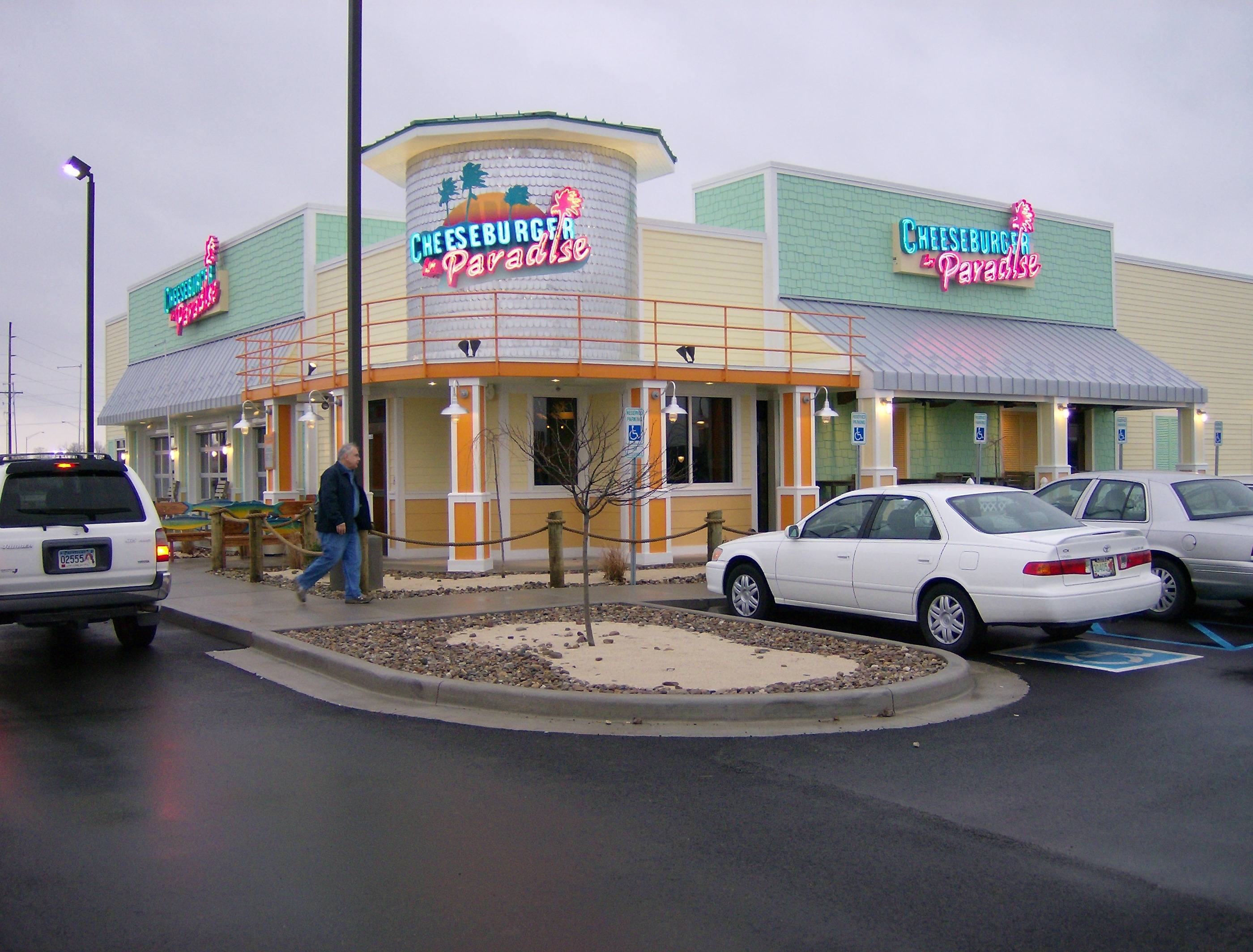
- Type: Subsidiary
- Industry: Restaurant
- Founded: 2002; 24 years ago in Southport, Indiana, U.S.
- Defunct: September 2020; 6 years ago
- Fate: Liquidation
- Headquarters: Houston, Texas, United States
- Number of locations: 38 (At peak, 2006)
- Area served: United States
- Key people: President: Steve Overholt
- Parent: Luby's
- Website: Last archive of official website

Cheeseburger in Paradise was a casual dining island-themed restaurant chain in the United States that operated between 2002 and 2020. The last location, located in Secaucus, New Jersey, temporarily closed in March 2020 and this was made permanent in September 2020. The restaurants were characterized by their Key West-style architecture and island decor.

== History ==
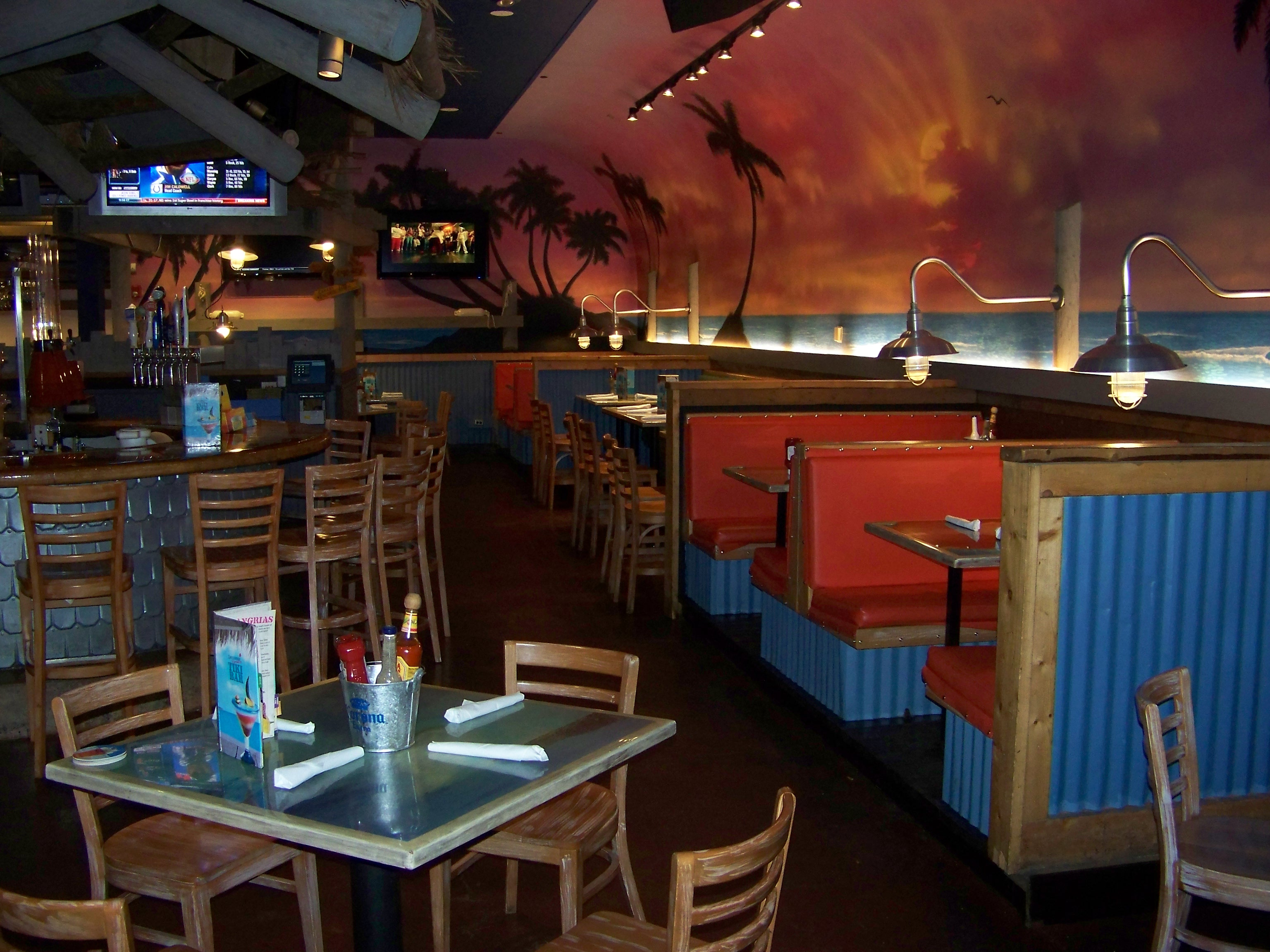
Inside of Cheeseburger in Paradise

The first restaurant opened on August 19, 2002, in the Southport area of Indianapolis, Indiana. The restaurant was named after the 1978 song "Cheeseburger in Paradise" by American pop music singer Jimmy Buffett. The chain was a partnership of Buffett's company, the Orlando, Florida-based Margaritaville Holdings LLC, and OSI Restaurant Partners, with Buffett licensing the name and Outback Steakhouse operating the franchising of the restaurants.

In September 2009, Cheeseburger in Paradise was sold to Paradise Restaurant Group, LLC. Jimmy Buffett was only a royalty partner, receiving 2% of profits until selling Paradise Restaurant Group the rights to the song "Cheeseburger in Paradise". In December 2012, Luby's purchased Paradise Restaurant Group for $11 million, thereby acquiring all of the restaurants and ending Jimmy Buffett's association with the chain. At the time of the sale, the company had 23 locations in 14 states.

=== Closings ===
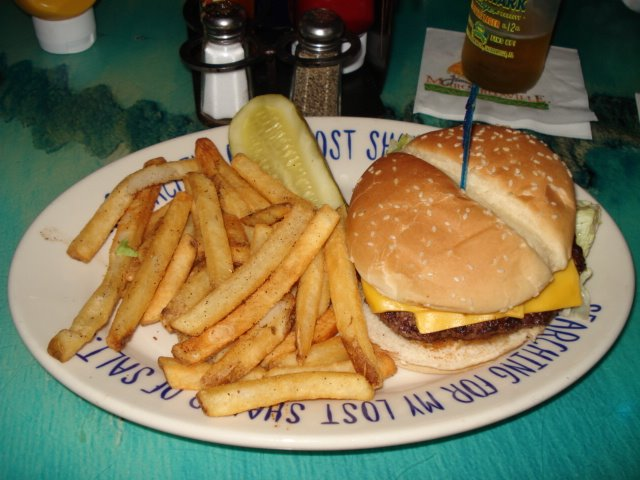
A Cheeseburger in Paradise from Jimmy Buffett's Margaritaville

After acquisition by Luby's, a number of the chain's locations were closed. In August 2014, Luby's announced to management and employees that half of the chain's remaining restaurants would close, either immediately or in the following few weeks. Affected restaurants included those in Fort Myers, Florida; Algonquin, Illinois; Newark, Delaware; Fishers, Indiana; Terre Haute, Indiana; Evansville, Indiana; Kansas City, Kansas; Middleton, Wisconsin; Sterling Heights, Michigan; and Pasadena, Maryland. Many of these locations were to be rebranded Fuddruckers Deluxe Bar and Grill, another concept owned by Luby's and a full-service version of their Fuddrucker's chain. Ultimately not all of them were, including the one in Fishers, Indiana and California, Maryland.

In August 2018, all restaurants except for the Omaha, Nebraska, and Secaucus, New Jersey, locations were closed, including the original restaurant in Indianapolis.

The Omaha location closed in early October 2018. The last remaining Cheeseburger in Paradise location was in Secaucus.

On September 8, 2020, Cheeseburger in Paradise owner Luby's, Inc. announced they plan to liquidate existing assets, including the assets of Cheeseburger in Paradise, distributing the proceeds to investors. The closure of the Secaucus location, which had been shuttered to the public since March 2020 due to the COVID-19 pandemic was made permanent at this time.

== Lahaina, Hawaii ==
A chain named Cheeseburger Restaurants based in Portola, California had one of their restaurants located in oceanfront Lahaina, Hawaii, also named "Cheeseburger in Paradise". This chain, which began in 1989, has no relation to Jimmy Buffett's business. Buffett sued the owners in 1997. After a four-year legal battle, a settlement was reached that allowed Laren Gartner and Edna Bayliff to keep the name at their existing restaurants in Lahaina and Waikiki but prevented them from using it at any additional locations. The Lahaina location burned down due to a wildfire in August 2023.

== See also ==
- Jimmy Buffett's Margaritaville
- Margaritaville Casino and Restaurant
- List of hamburger restaurants
- Cheeseburger
