= Near Northwest, Texas =

Human settlement in Houston, Texas, United States of America

Coordinates: 29°50′39″N 95°30′20″W

Near Northwest is a 16-square-mile (41 km^{2}) district located in Harris County, Texas, partly within the city limits of Houston and partly in an unincorporated area. It is governed by the Near Northwest Management District, with its headquarters at the White Oak Conference Center, 7603 Antoine Dr, Houston, Texas.

== History ==
The State of Texas established the management district in 2001.

== Demographics ==
As of the 1990 Census, 55,908 lived in what would become the district. As of the 2000 Census 67,034 lived in what is now the district. A 2008 estimate stated that 71,013 lived in the Near Northwest district. A 2013 projection stated that the number would increase to 75,485.

== Economy ==
The district has over 2,500,000 square feet (230,000 m^{2}) of industrial, office, and retail space. Luby's has its headquarters in the district and in Houston.

== Education ==
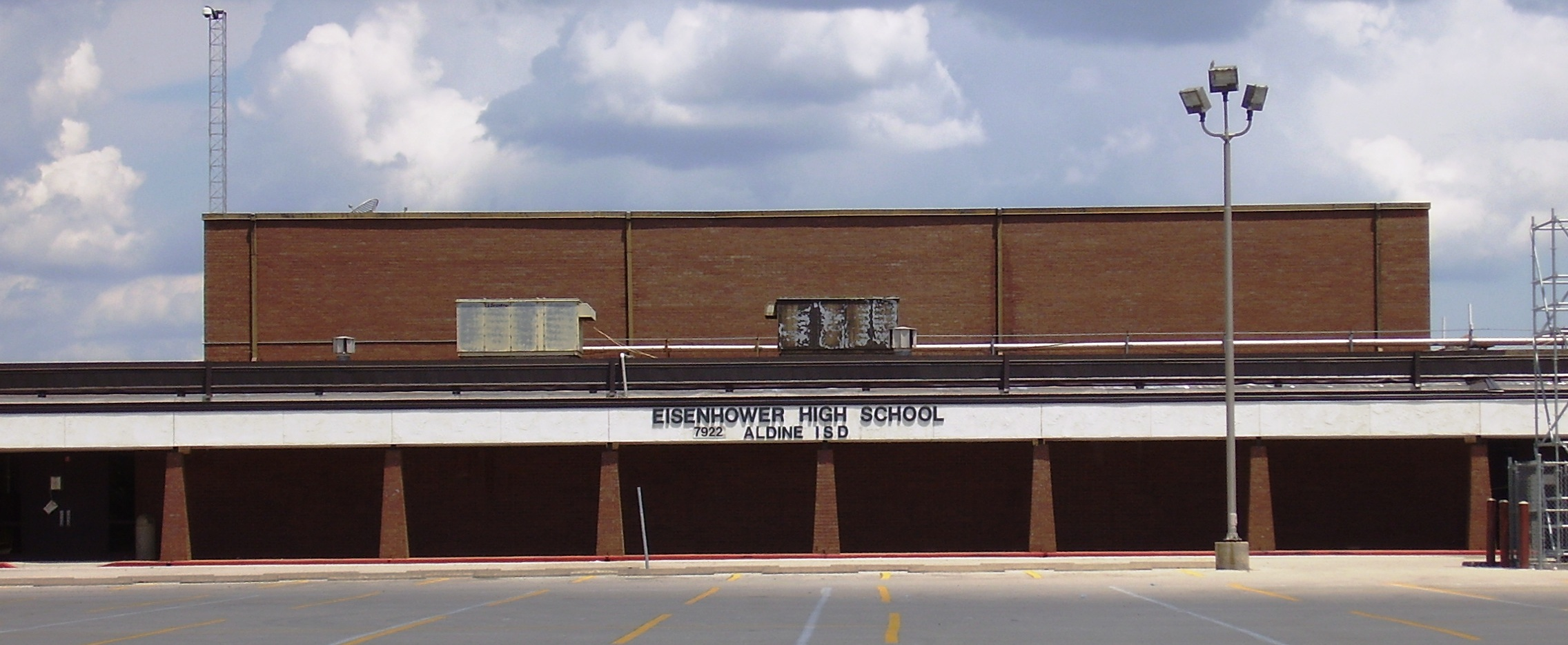
Eisenhower High School

A portion of the district's territory is in the Aldine Independent School District. All AISD residents of Near Northwest are zoned to Vines EC/PK School, located outside the district. AISD elementary schools serving sections of the district include Ermel Academy (in the district), Smith Academy (in the district), and Harris Academy (outside the district). All residents of the AISD portion are zoned to Caraway Intermediate School (outside the district), Hoffman Middle School (in the district), Eisenhower 9th Grade School (in the district), and Eisenhower High School (in the district).

A portion of the district's territory is in the Klein Independent School District. Elementary schools within Near Northwest serving sections of the district include Epps Island, Eiland, and Nitsch, while McDougle, outside of the district, also serves a portion of the district. Middle school residents of that section are zoned to Klein Intermediate School (in the district), and high school residents are zoned to Klein Forest High School (outside the district).

A portion of the district's territory is in the Houston Independent School District. Residents of that section are zoned to Kate Smith Elementary School (outside the district), Clifton Middle School (in the district), and Scarborough High School (outside the district), all in Houston.

A portion of the district's territory is in the Cypress Fairbanks Independent School District. CFISD elementary schools serving sections of the district include Holbrook (in the district), Bane (outside the district), and Frazier (outside the district). Some CFISD portions are zoned to Cook Middle School, and some portions are zoned to Dean Middle School; both are outside the district. Jersey Village High School (Jersey Village) serves all CFISD portions of Near Northwest.

Some apartment complexes in Near Northwest are zoned to both Houston ISD and Aldine ISD. Specific units within the complexes are earmarked for HISD and for AISD.
