= Paul Jetton =

American football player (1964–2016)

No. 68
- Positions: Guard, center

Personal information
- Born: October 6, 1964; Houston, Texas, U.S.
- Died: May 13, 2016 (aged 51); Wimberley, Texas, U.S.
- Listed height: 6 ft 4 in (1.93 m)
- Listed weight: 295 lb (134 kg)

Career information
- High school: Jersey Village (Jersey Village, Texas)
- College: Texas
- NFL draft: 1988: 6th round, 141st overall pick

Career history
- Cincinnati Bengals (1988–1991); New Orleans Saints (1992–1993); Detroit Lions (1994)*
- * Offseason or practice squad member only

Awards and highlights
- First-team All-SWC (1986, 1987); 1987 Astro-Bluebonnet Bowl champion

Career NFL statistics
- Games played: 30
- Games started: 10
- Stats at Pro Football Reference

Paul Ray Jetton (October 6, 1964 – May 13, 2016) was an American professional football offensive lineman who played four seasons in the National Football League (NFL) with the Cincinnati Bengals and New Orleans Saints and played college football at the University of Texas at Austin where he also threw the shot put. He was on the Bengals injured reserve list when they went to Super Bowl XXIII.

== College football ==
Jetton was recruited out of Jersey Village High School in Jersey Village, Texas and played college football at the University of Texas at Austin. He was a two-time all-conference offensive guard and a team captain.

Jetton was also on the track and field team where he threw the shot put. He had several top 8 finishes, including coming in third at the 1987 Southwest Conference Championships.

== Professional career ==
Jetton was drafted by the Cincinnati Bengals in the sixth round of the 1988 NFL draft and was a part of the team for four injury-plagued seasons before moving on to New Orleans. Prior to the 1988 season, he was placed on injured reserve and remained there all season as the Bengals went all the way to Super Bowl XXIII. He was a starter in two games for the 1989 season, but an early season knee injury put him on the injured reserve again. His most successful season was in 1990, when he played in all 15 games and started in the Bengals final playoff game. At the start of the 1991 season, Jetton was again dealing with a knee injury, but managed to be a starter for the first half of the season, before winding up on the injured reserve list again.

Following the 1991 season, Jetton became a "Plan B" free agent and was signed by the New Orleans Saints, then waived at the start of the season and then brought back after a month. He played in only two games in 1992. He began the 1993 season injured/inactive again and then saw no playing time.

He died in 2016 in Wimberley, Texas, where he made his home.
