= Scarborough High School (Texas) =

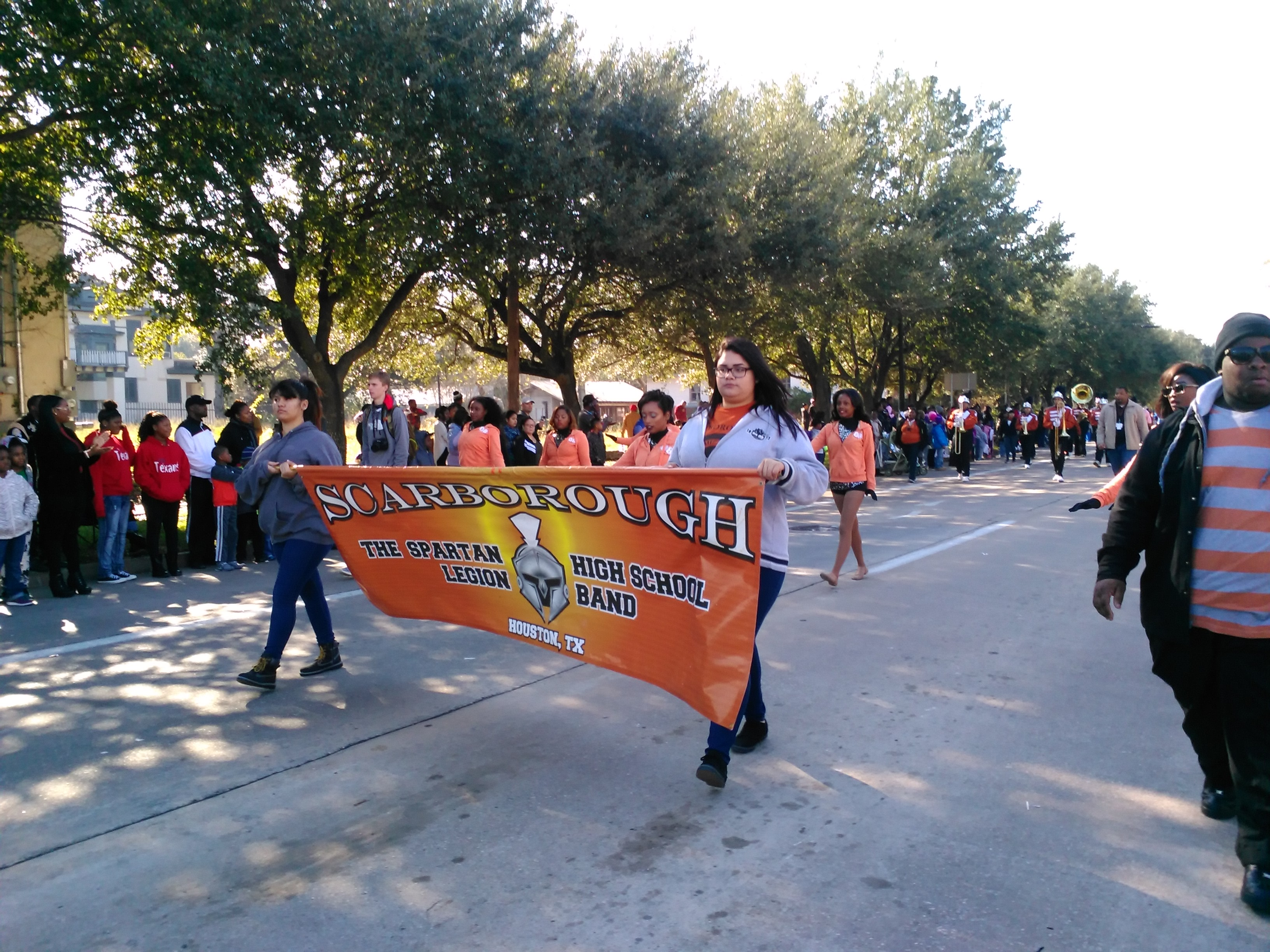
- Scarborough at the 2016 MLK Day parade in Midtown, Houston

Location
- 4141 Costa Rica Road; Houston, Texas 77092; U.S. 29°49′45″N 95°28′10.5″W

Information
- Type: Public Secondary
- Motto: "Success is about attitude and expectations everyday!"
- Established: 1968
- School district: Houston Independent School District
- Principal: Rod Trevino
- Teaching staff: 44.38 (FTE)
- Grades: 9–12
- Enrollment: 750 (2022-23)
- Student to teacher ratio: 16.90
- Campus type: Suburban
- Colors: Orange and white
- Team name: Spartans
- Website: scarboroughhs.houstonisd.org

George Cameron Scarborough High School is a secondary school located at 4141 Costa Rica in Houston, Texas, United States with a ZIP code of 77092. Part of the Houston Independent School District, Scarborough serves grades nine through twelve and has Houston ISD's Futures Academy.

== History ==
The school was named after school board member George Cameron Scarborough. Its first principal was W. L. Fromein. Scarborough was founded on a 21-acre (85,000 m^{2}) plot on May 27, 1968. The school relieved Waltrip High School. Originally, the plan was for both a junior and senior high school, but it became a high school in 1979 when Clifton Middle School opened.

Scarborough was named a 1986-87 National Blue Ribbon School.

In 1999 Scarborough had 958 students. That year, there were 16 students who had previously attended private schools. 14 students who previously attended private schools began attending Scarborough in 2000.

In 2007, a Johns Hopkins University study commissioned by the Associated Press cited Scarborough as a "second rate school

In 2008 the school had a per student cost of $5,442, with 890 students attending the school.

In 2014 the district scheduled the elimination of the Scarborough architecture program for the 2015-2016 school year.

== Neighborhoods served ==
The neighborhoods served by Scarborough include Langwood III, Candlelight Oaks, Candlelight Oaks Village, Forest Pines, Forest West, and part of Oak Forest.

A portion of the Near Northwest district is served by the school.

== Student body ==
The enrolled student body, which totaled 750 during the 2022-2023 school year, is mostly Hispanic.

- 82.4% Hispanic American
- 12.8% African American
- 3.5% White American
- 0.4% Asian American
- 0.1% Native American
- 0.8% Multiracial

== Strict dress code and school uniforms ==
In the 2007-2008 school year, Scarborough has school uniforms. Official school colors are orange & white

The Texas Education Agency specified that the parents and/or guardians of students zoned to a school with uniforms may apply for a waiver to opt out of the uniform policy so their children do not have to wear the uniform; parents must specify "bona fide" reasons, such as religious reasons or philosophical objections.

== Feeder pattern ==
Feeder elementary schools to Scarborough High School include:

- Kate Smith
- Benbrook (portion)
- Wainwright (portion)

Feeder middle schools include:

- Clifton
- Black (portion)

== Notable alumni ==
- Dwayne Bohac (Class of 1984), member of the Texas House of Representatives for District 138 in Harris County
- Bobby Brock aka Bobby Rock former drummer for the band Nelson, and current drummer for Lita Ford
- Blas Elias (Class of 1986), drummer for Slaughter, Blue Man Group, and Trans-Siberian Orchestra
- Marty Froelick, professional runner
