= Fuddruckers =

American hamburger restaurant chain

Fuddruckers Restaurants, LLC
- Fuddruckers logo, used since 2018
- Trade name: Fuddruckers
- Formerly: Freddie Fuddruckers (1979–1980)
- Type: Subsidiary
- Industry: Restaurants Franchising
- Genre: Fast casual
- Founded: 1979; 47 years ago (as Freddie Fuddruckers); San Antonio, Texas
- Founder: Philip J. Romano
- Headquarters: Houston, Texas, U.S.
- Number of locations: 42 (September 2026)
- Area served: North America; Middle East
- Key people: Peter Large (CEO); Todd Coutee (COO)
- Products: Burgers, chicken sandwiches, french fries, soft drinks, milkshakes
- Revenue: $148.8 million
- Parent: Magic Brands (1998–2010); Luby's (2010–2020); Black Titan Franchise Systems (2020–present)
- Website: fuddruckers.com

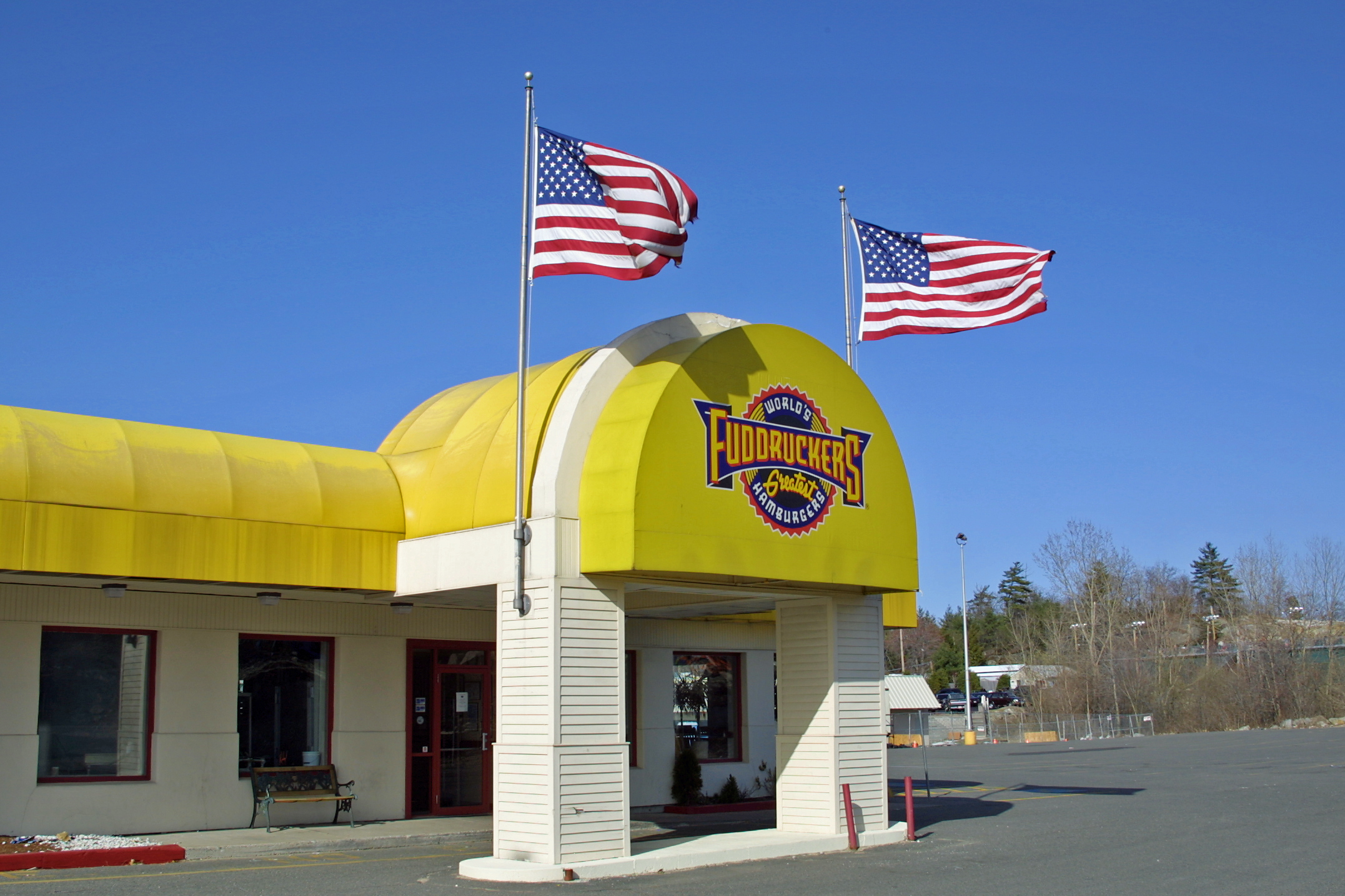
Fuddruckers Restaurant, Rt. 1 Saugus, Massachusetts - 2001 (closed in December 2023)

Fuddruckers (sometimes abbreviated as Fudds) is an American fast casual, franchised restaurant chain that specializes in hamburgers. As of 2026, Fuddruckers had 42 restaurants across the United States, 2 in Canada, and 1 in Mexico. The company headquarters is in Houston, Texas. On September 8, 2020, Fuddruckers owner Luby's, Inc. announced that they planned to liquidate existing assets, including Fuddruckers' assets, distributing the proceeds to investors after the proposed sale of the chains. On June 21, 2021, Black Titan Franchise Systems announced a deal to acquire Fuddruckers for $18.5 million.

== History ==
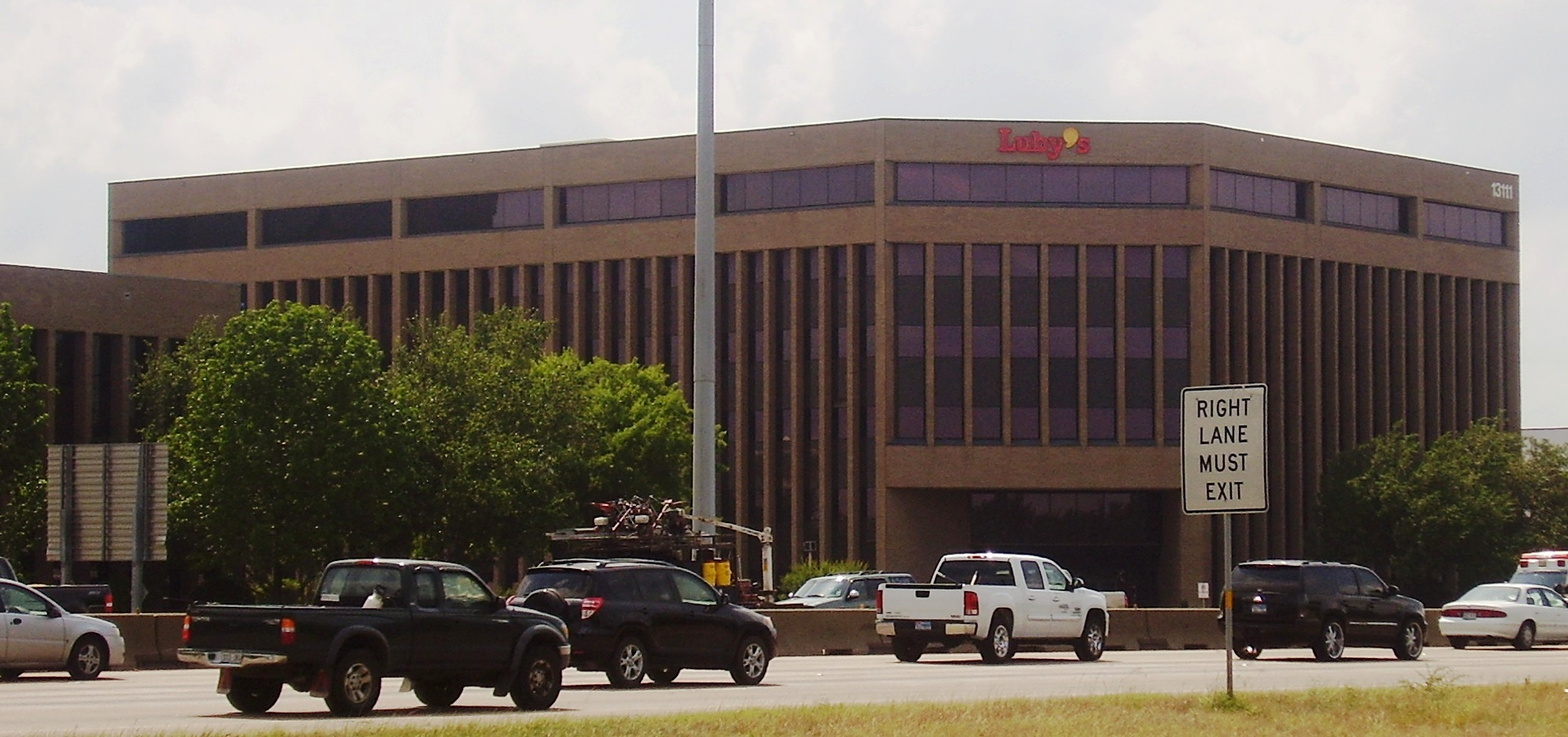
The headquarters of Luby's, former parent company of Fuddruckers

Logo used until 2018. Still seen on some locations

=== Founding and growth ===
Fuddruckers was founded as Freddie Fuddruckers in 1979 by Philip J. Romano in San Antonio, Texas, at a location converted from an old bank to a restaurant. He started the chain because he thought that "the world needed a better hamburger". The name derived from "Fudpucker World Airways", a fictional airline using steam-powered aircraft that was an in-joke among pilots and aviation enthusiasts. The Fuddruckers concept was to offer large hamburgers in which the meat was ground on site and buns were baked on the premises, and hamburgers and other dishes were offered with "lots of fresh sliced tomatoes, onions, lettuce, and vats of cheese sauce". In California, Fuddruckers competed at the high end of the fast-food market against chains such as Flakey Jake's, sometimes with head-to-head competitions in places such as Northridge, California. By 1988, there were 150 restaurants in the chain. Romano left the chain in 1988 to form Romano's Macaroni Grill. In an interview, Romano stated: "I just felt I had done all I could for the concept."

Fuddruckers was purchased in November 1998 by Michael Cannon, and later it was purchased by Magic Brands.

In August 2014, Fuddruckers opened the first of its new stores called Fuddruckers Deluxe in Newport News, Virginia, a full-service, sit-down restaurant serving traditional and new menu items, with a wait staff, full bar, and multiple TVs, although it did not offer different-sized burgers or a "produce and fixings bar" like its traditional restaurants. As of 2018, the restaurant has been closed.

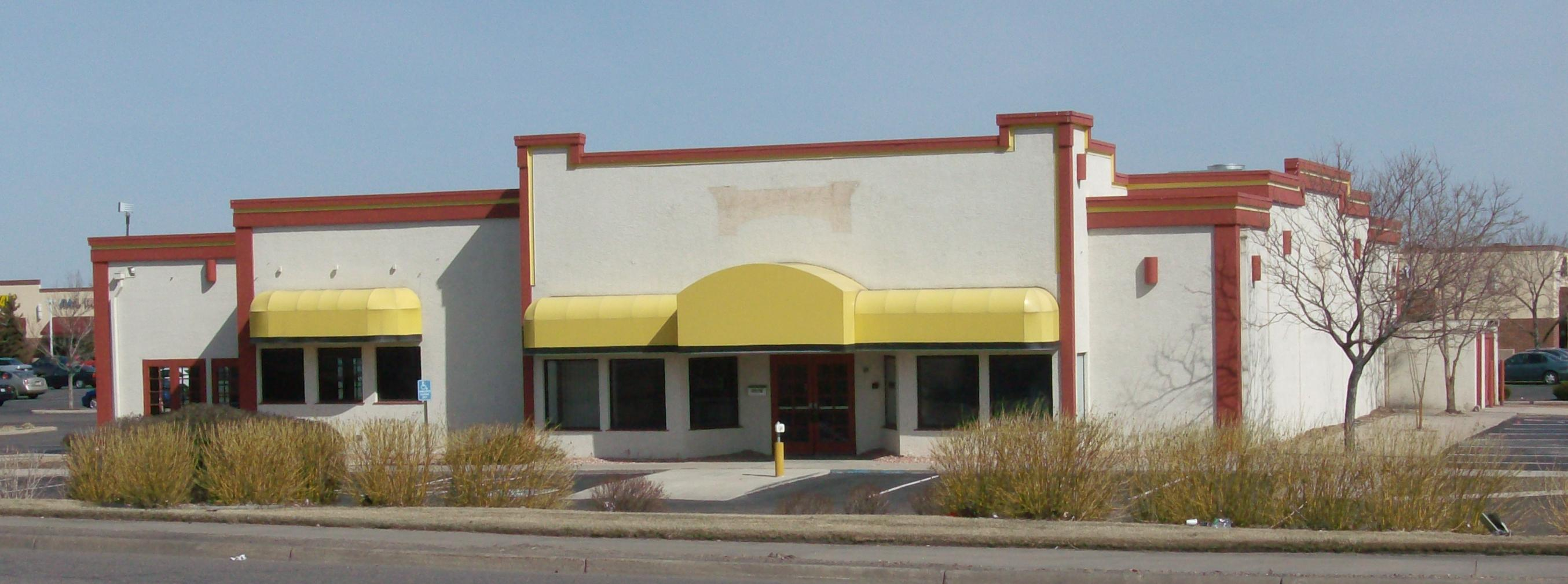
One of three Fuddruckers in Colorado that closed in 2010

=== Bankruptcy and ownership changes ===
The 2008 financial crisis hit the restaurant industry hard, including Fuddruckers. On April 22, 2010, the parent of Fuddruckers, Austin-based Magic Brands LLC, announced plans to file for Chapter 11 bankruptcy protection. It originally planned to sell most of its assets, including Fuddruckers and the Koo Koo Roo brand eateries, to the Tavistock Group for $40 million. On the same day, the firm announced that 24 Fuddruckers restaurants would be closed, several of them in the metro Washington, DC, area.

On June 18, 2010, Tavistock was outbid by Luby's for Fuddruckers' assets at auction, with a $61 million winning bid. A second estimate was that the sale amount was for $63.45 million. Luby's acquisition of Fuddruckers and Koo Koo Roo was finalized in 2010. During 2011, there were controversies with previous franchise owners regarding the use of the Fuddruckers brand name.

=== Luby's closure and dissolution ===
On June 3, 2020, Luby's board of directors announced plans to sell all its operating divisions and assets, including real estate assets. This decision was influenced in part by circumstances surrounding the COVID-19 pandemic. Net proceeds from transactions were to benefit Luby's stockholders. The company did not have a definitive timeline for future transactions, but expected to eventually wind down remaining operations.

On September 8, 2020, Luby's further announced it had adopted a plan to liquidate all of its existing assets, as opposed to operating in the current form or merely selling off divisions.

As of September 11, 2020, 80 Luby's and Fuddruckers were still in operation.

About 99% of Luby's stockholders voted for dissolution in November 2020. Luby's planned to close all locations by August 2021.

=== Sale to affiliate of Nicholas Perkins ===
On June 17, 2021, Luby's announced that it had entered into an agreement to sell the Fuddruckers franchise business operations to Black Titan Franchise Systems LLC, an affiliate of Nicholas Perkins'. As a result, the remaining Fuddruckers locations have remained open past the previously planned closure date of August 2021.

== Menu ==
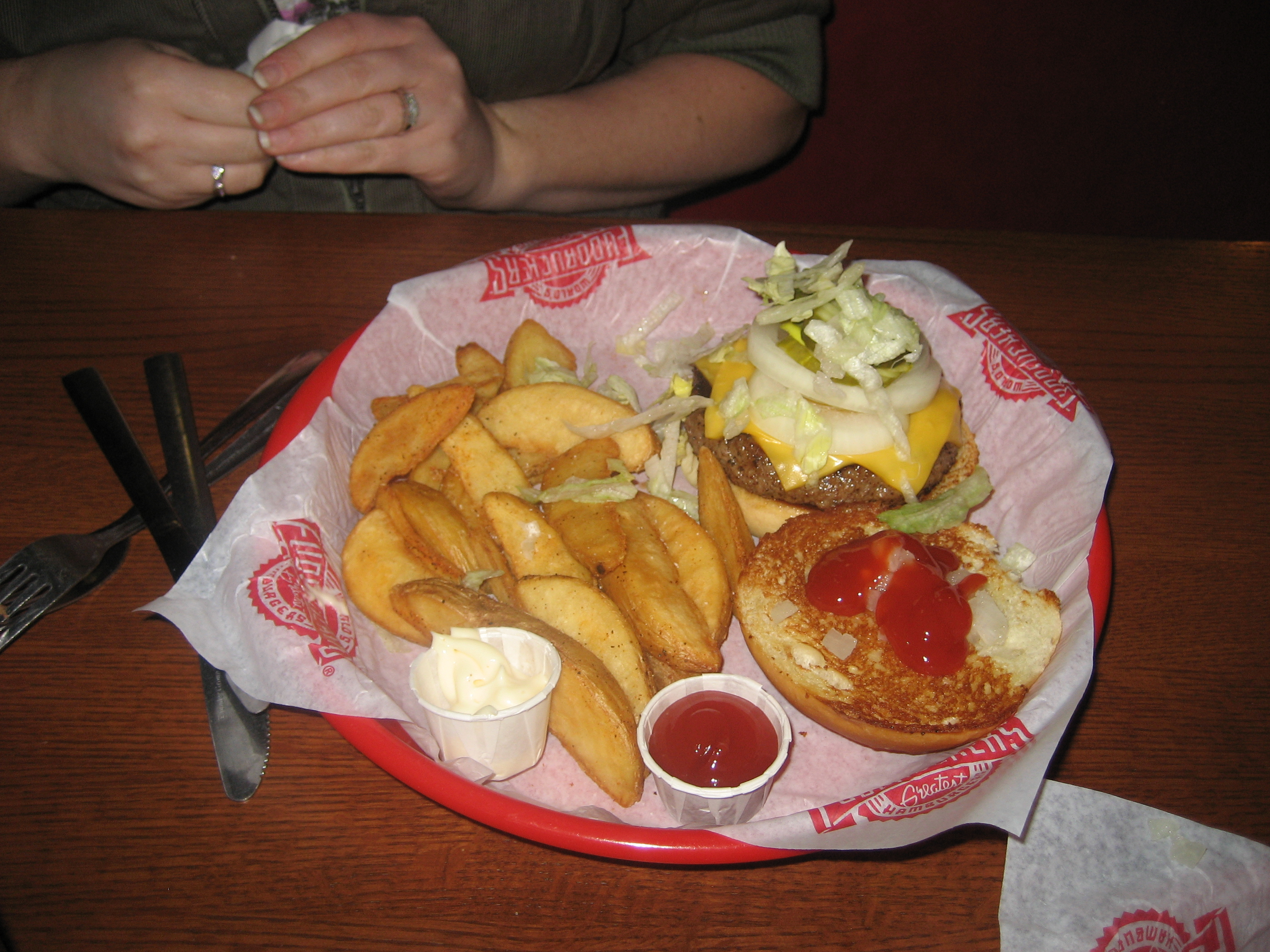
Cheeseburger, fries and condiments at a Fuddruckers

The chain offered its Original Fudds Burge' in various sizes, of 1/3, 1/2, 2/3, and 1 pound (151, 227, 302, 454 g). The primary focus is on hamburgers, but other options are offered, including chicken, fish, and exotic burgers (buffalo, elk, ostrich, and wild boar).

In 2006, Foxwood executive sous chef Scott Ferguson and Mark Collins made a burger weighing 29.6 lb (13.4 kg) and costing US$250, for the Fuddruckers restaurant in the casino. The burger was 18.5 in (470 mm) wide and 8 in (200 mm) tall. At the time, this was the world's largest commercially available burger.

== Business ==
=== Franchise model ===
While some Fuddruckers restaurants are company-owned, the majority are owned by individual franchisees.

In 2010, 135 franchisee-owned Fuddruckers were in the United States. In 2011, Fuddruckers had 200 restaurants throughout North America, of which two-thirds were owned by small-business owners and 59 were company-operated locations. By the end of 2015, Fuddruckers had 188 locations, with 35 outside the US.

As of July 2025, the Fuddruckers website lists 44 locations within the United States, and an additional one in Mexico and two in Canada.

=== Headquarters ===
The firm has moved its headquarters location several times. Currently, the headquarters is near the northwest district of Houston, Texas. It has been there since the acquisition by Luby's in 2010. From 2005 to 2010, Fuddruckers was headquartered in southwest Austin, Texas; before that, in North Andover, Massachusetts, before that at Cherry Hill Park in Beverly, Massachusetts, before that in One Corporate Place in Danvers, Massachusetts; before that, in Lakeside Office Park in Wakefield, Massachusetts. When it shifted headquarters from the Boston area to Austin in 2005, it spent $1million and laid off 30 employees to operate more efficiently, according to chief financial officer Matt Pannek. Within six weeks of the move, the company hired 30 new employees for the Austin headquarters. By September 2005, the company employed 80 people in 16,000 sq ft (1,500 m^{2}) of space in two temporary offices in the Monterey Oaks Corporate Park in southwest Austin. By December 2005 the company planned to move into about 16,000–17,000 square feet (1,500–1,600m^{2}) of space in an adjacent building and turn one of the original Austin facilities into a training center and test kitchen. Pannek said that the central location of the headquarters allows the company to more easily communicate with its franchisees across the United States.

=== Locations ===
Fuddruckers expanded outside of the United States, with locations in Canada in the mid-1980s, including Saskatoon and Regina, Saskatchewan. Their first Australian store opening in Brisbane's Eagle Street Pier shopping centre in November 1993, followed by another store in the Logan Hyperdome south of Brisbane in August 1994 (which closed in August 1995, having never made a profit), and a store opening at the Macquarie shopping centre at North Ryde in Sydney in September 1994, all operated under franchise by Butcher Baker Goodtimes Maker until late 1996, when the franchisee went bankrupt and Fuddruckers left the country.

Fuddruckers opened their first Middle Eastern location opening in May 1994 in Jeddah, Saudi Arabia, by Arabian Food Supplies. Fuddruckers opened restaurants in Argentina in 1988; later, however, sales fell and Fuddruckers left the country. In 2013, Fuddruckers opened its first restaurant in Santo Domingo, Dominican Republic, which later closed. They also opened restaurants in Santiago, Chile, and Bogotá, Colombia, all of which have since been closed.

In 2014, Fuddruckers partnered with Italian-based franchisee Vinum et Alia to open 10 restaurants across Italy, Poland, and Switzerland. Their first restaurant opened in Varese (Lombardy). They later added locations in Legnano and Casnate con Bernate, Italy, as well as Warsaw, Poland. However, as of 2019, this franchisee was no longer active and all European locations had been shut down.

As of June 2019, Fuddruckers had 156 locations across the United States and a further eight run by franchise partners with one each in Saskatoon and Regina, Saskatchewan, Canada, two in Mérida, Yucatán, Mexico, one in Caguas, Puerto Rico, and three in Panama City, Panama. An additional 33 locations are licensed in the Middle East, with restaurants in Saudi Arabia, Egypt, the United Arab Emirates, Qatar, Jordan, Bahrain, and Kuwait.

== See also ==
- List of hamburger restaurants
