= Klein Forest High School =

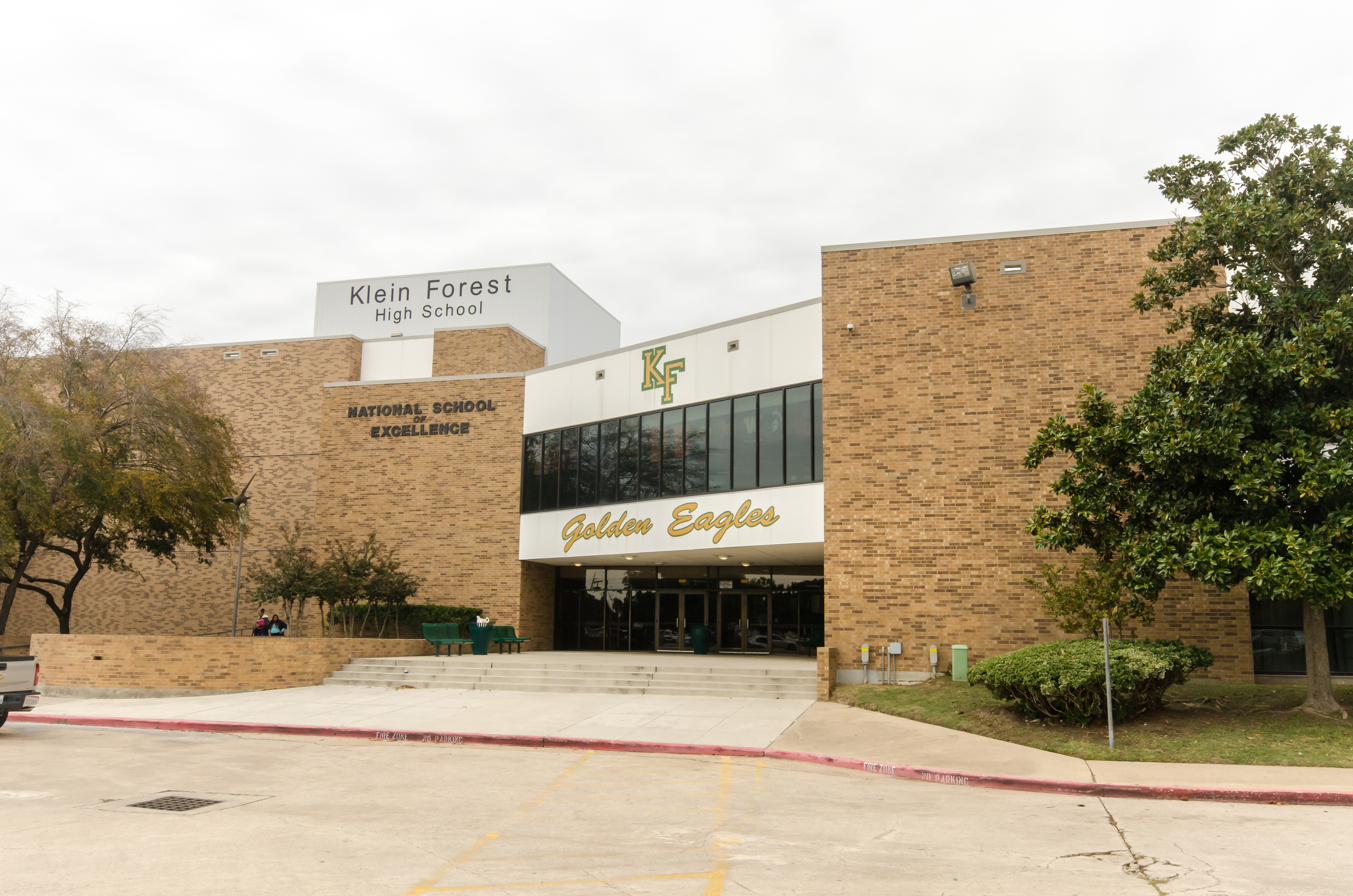

Location
- 11400 Misty Valley; Houston, Texas 77066; 29.9658°N 95.4999°W

Information
- Type: Public high school
- Motto: Installing Leadership and Purpose in Every Voice
- Established: September 4, 1979
- School district: Klein ISD
- Principal: John Alexander
- Faculty: 243.65 FTEs
- Grades: 9-12
- Enrollment: 3,453 (2023–2024)
- Student to teacher ratio: 14.17
- Campus: Suburban
- Colors: Green and gold
- Athletics conference: UIL Class 6A
- Team name: Golden Eagles
- Newspaper: The Pinnacle
- Yearbook: Evergreen
- Website: kleinforest.kleinisd.net

Klein Forest High School is a public senior high school in unincorporated Harris County, Texas, United States, near Houston. It is a part of the Klein Independent School District.

It was the second high school built in Klein ISD. Opening in the fall of 1979, Klein Forest welcomes students from the southern side of the district, including the Champions area of F.M. 1960. Klein Forest celebrated its 30th anniversary in 2009. There are two intermediate campuses and eight elementary schools within its feeder pattern. In the spring of 2011, Klein Forest opened an NCAA-modeled athletic facility. Klein Forest serves grades 9-12. A portion of the Near Northwest district is served by the school.

== History ==
In 2017, areas of the Klein Forest zone between Cypress Creek and Farm to Market Road 1960 were rezoned to Klein High School.

On January 16, 2020, a firework went off during one of the school's lunch periods. The student responsible for the incident was detained and later expelled. Four students who were sitting near the blasting area suffered minor injuries.

On September 15, 2022, a student made a false bomb threat to the school. This prompted the campus to be evacuated and classes to be cancelled for the day. The student responsible for the threat was detained and later expelled with charges of terroristic threat. Additional police presence remained the rest of the week, and classes resumed the following day.

== Academics ==
During the 2001-02 school year, Klein Forest High School was recognized with the Blue Ribbon School Award of Excellence by the United States Department of Education, the highest award an American school can receive.

For the 2021-22 school year, the school received a C grade from the Texas Education Agency, with an overall score of 72 out of 100. The school received a C grade in two domains, Student Achievement (score of 70) and School Progress (score of 76), and a Not Rated grade in Closing the Gaps (score of 61). The school did not receive any of the seven possible distinction designations.

== Feeder pattern ==
For the 2018-19 school year, students who attended these schools were within Klein Forest High School's attendance zone:

Wunderlich Intermediate	Klein Intermediate
Greenwood Forest Elementary	Eiland Elementary
Kaiser Elementary	Epps Island Elementary
Klenk Elementary	Nitsch Elementary
McDougle Elementary (partial)	McDougle Elementary (partial)

A small portion of Houston is within the school's attendance boundary.

== Demographics ==
As of the 2022-23 school year, there were 2,497 students eligible for free lunch and 248 eligible for reduced-price lunch.

In 2022–23, the racial/ethnic distribution of students was:

- 66.4% Hispanic
- 21.7% Black
- 6.8% Asian
- 2.6% White
- 1.8% two or more races
- 0.6% American Indian/Alaskan
- 0.1% Pacific Islander

== Sports ==
Klein Forest participates in football, basketball, baseball, volleyball, water polo, swimming/diving, golf, softball, track and field, cross-country, tennis, wrestling and soccer.

== Notable alumni ==
- Derrick Brew — gold medalist in the men's 4 × 400 m relay at the 2004 Summer Olympics.
- Ron Edwards — NFL defensive tackle for the Kansas City Chiefs
- Charles Gaines — professional basketball player
- Steve Jackson — NFL player; played safety for the Tennessee Titans 1991–99
- Toure' Murry (Class of 2008) — professional basketball player for the NBA's New York Knicks
- Darrion Nguyen — science communicator
- Ben Pronsky (Class of 1997) — stage and film actor
- Mark Saccomanno — player for the minor league Round Rock Express baseball team; drafted by the Houston Astros in 2003
- Brad Spence (Class of 2023) — college football defensive end for the Texas Longhorns
