= Romano's Macaroni Grill =

American restaurant chain

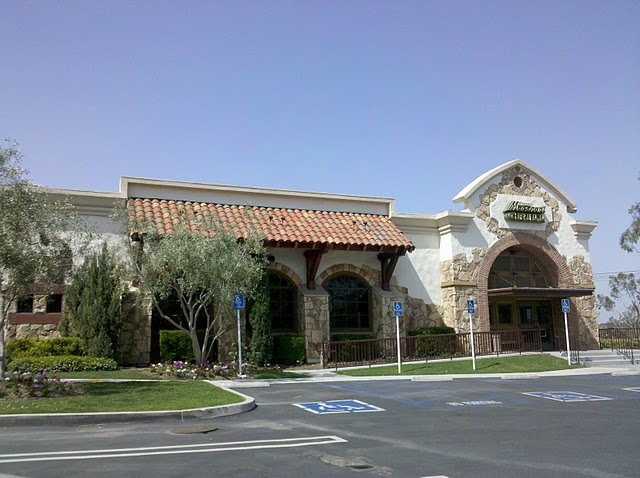
- A Romano's Macaroni Grill in Anaheim Hills, CA in March 2010 (closed by early 2020)
- Type: Wholly owned subsidiary
- Industry: Restaurant
- Genre: Casual dining
- Founded: 1988 in Leon Springs, Texas
- Founder: Philip J. Romano
- Headquarters: Denver, Colorado, U.S.
- Key people: Jason Kemp (President & CEO)
- Products: Italian-American cuisine; (pasta; pizza; chicken; seafood; salad)
- Parent: Brinker International (1989–2008); Mac Acquisition LLC (2008–2013); Ignite Restaurant Group (2013–2015); Redrock Partners LLC (2015–2023); RMG Acquisition Company (2015–2023)
- Website: macaronigrill.com

Romano's Macaroni Grill is an American casual dining restaurant chain specializing in Italian-American cuisine. Peaking at 158 locations in 2014, as of 2025, there are 17 locations.

== History ==
Romano's first restaurant was founded by restaurateur Philip J. Romano (who had also founded the hamburger chain Fuddruckers in 1979; he had sold his shares in that company when he founded Romano's) in Leon Springs, Texas (now a district of San Antonio), on April 19, 1988. The location would later be occupied by Burkle's The Grill at Leon Springs, which closed in May 2021 after a fire.

Brinker International, Inc. bought the franchise rights to the company on November 22, 1989.

Brinker announced on August 8, 2007, that it would begin exploring a buyer for the 230 company-owned stores. On December 18, 2008, Brinker announced that a majority stake in the chain was sold to Mac Acquisition LLC, an affiliate of Golden Gate Capital. As of June 29, 2011, Brinker still holds a 15.6% minority interest in the concept.

On February 6, 2013, Ignite Restaurant Group announced the acquisition of Romano's Macaroni Grill from Golden Gate Capital through a $55.0 million all-cash transaction. Redrock Partners LLC purchased the concept from Ignite in April 2015 for $8 million.

On October 18, 2017, Romano's Macaroni Grill filed for Chapter 11 bankruptcy protection.

On September 21, 2018, Romano's bought Sullivan's Steakhouse for $32 million.

In July, 2023, Jason Kemp became President and Chief Executive Officer of Romano's Macaroni Grill. Jason Kemp was the former President & CEO & owner of multiple restaurant chains including Furr's Fresh Buffet, Ryan's Steakhouse, Old Country Buffet, Hometown Buffet, Sushi Zushi, Zio's Italian Kitchen, Tahoe Joe's and more.

A large number of these brands ended up filing for bankruptcy.

On April 20, 2021, both Buffets, LLC (Hometown Buffet, Old Country Buffet, Ryan's, and Tahoe Joe's) and Fresh Acquisitions, LLC (Furr's) filed for Chapter 11 Bankruptcy. Several of the owners of VitaNova Brands and its related entities which Jason Kemp was linked to have been named in multiple lawsuits alleging serious fraud and theft of money from both their business partners and the federal government. One of these suits was filed by the bankruptcy trustee in the April 20, 2021 bankruptcy case and alleges the theft of $13M of Paycheck Protection Program Loans by Jason Kemp, and his partners.

In recent years, Jason Kemp has been sued by multiple investors for misuse of funds. The company is currently faced with multiple eviction lawsuits by landlords for unpaid rents too.

The company has filed bankruptcy and currently managed by the Board of Directors.

== Products ==
Romano's Macaroni Grill menu features items found in traditional cuisine from Italy and the Mediterranean area. The menu includes a custom-assembled pasta dish, with a choice of pastas, sauces, and toppings. Meals are served with complimentary bread and olive oil.

In addition to their restaurants, the brand also features a line of packaged food products based on dishes offered by the restaurant. The packages are manufactured by General Mills Restaurant Favorites line.

== Nutrition ==
In 2007, Men's Health rated Romano's Macaroni Grill one of the unhealthiest restaurant chains, giving it an 'F' on its "Restaurant Report Card." According to the report, an average meal from the chain contains over 1,000 calories. Three years later, however, the magazine rated Macaroni Grill as the healthiest Italian chain, noting that a number of entrees had significantly decreased in calorie count. This was attributed to the hiring of a new CEO with a "multiphase plan to improve the nutritional quality."

== Gallery ==
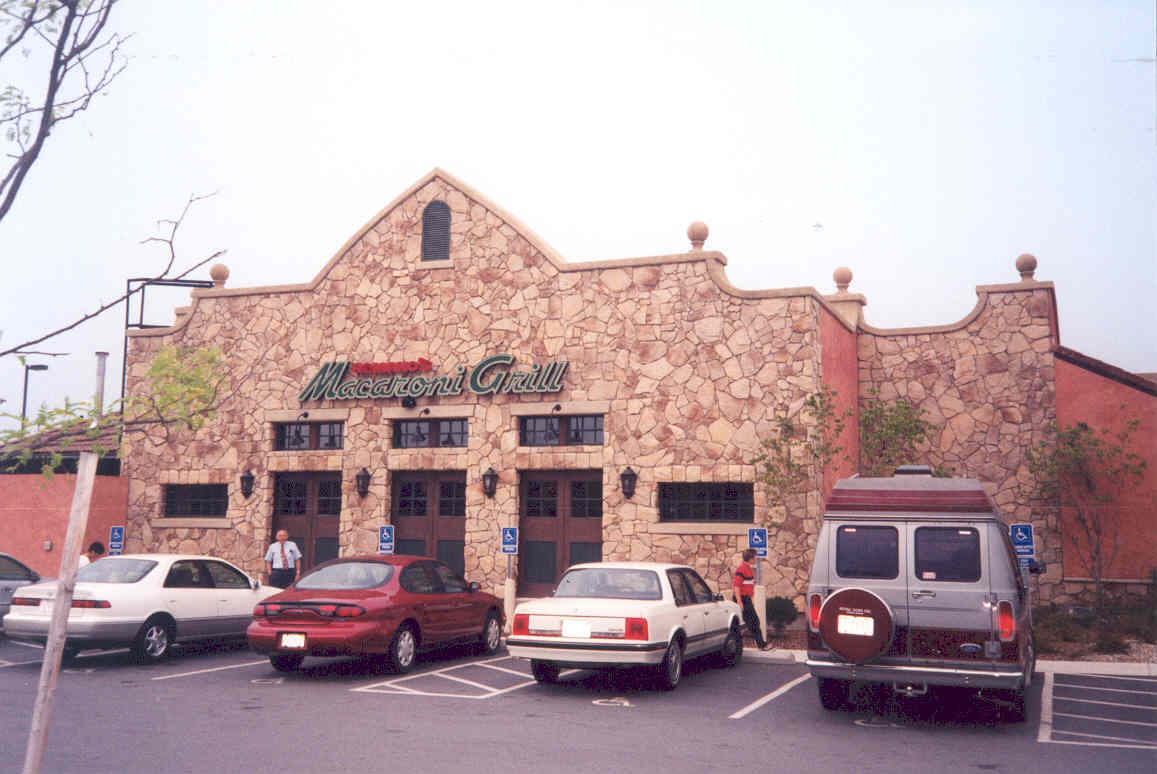
A Romano's in Burlington, MA in September, 2008 (closed in February 2017, now Eddie V's)

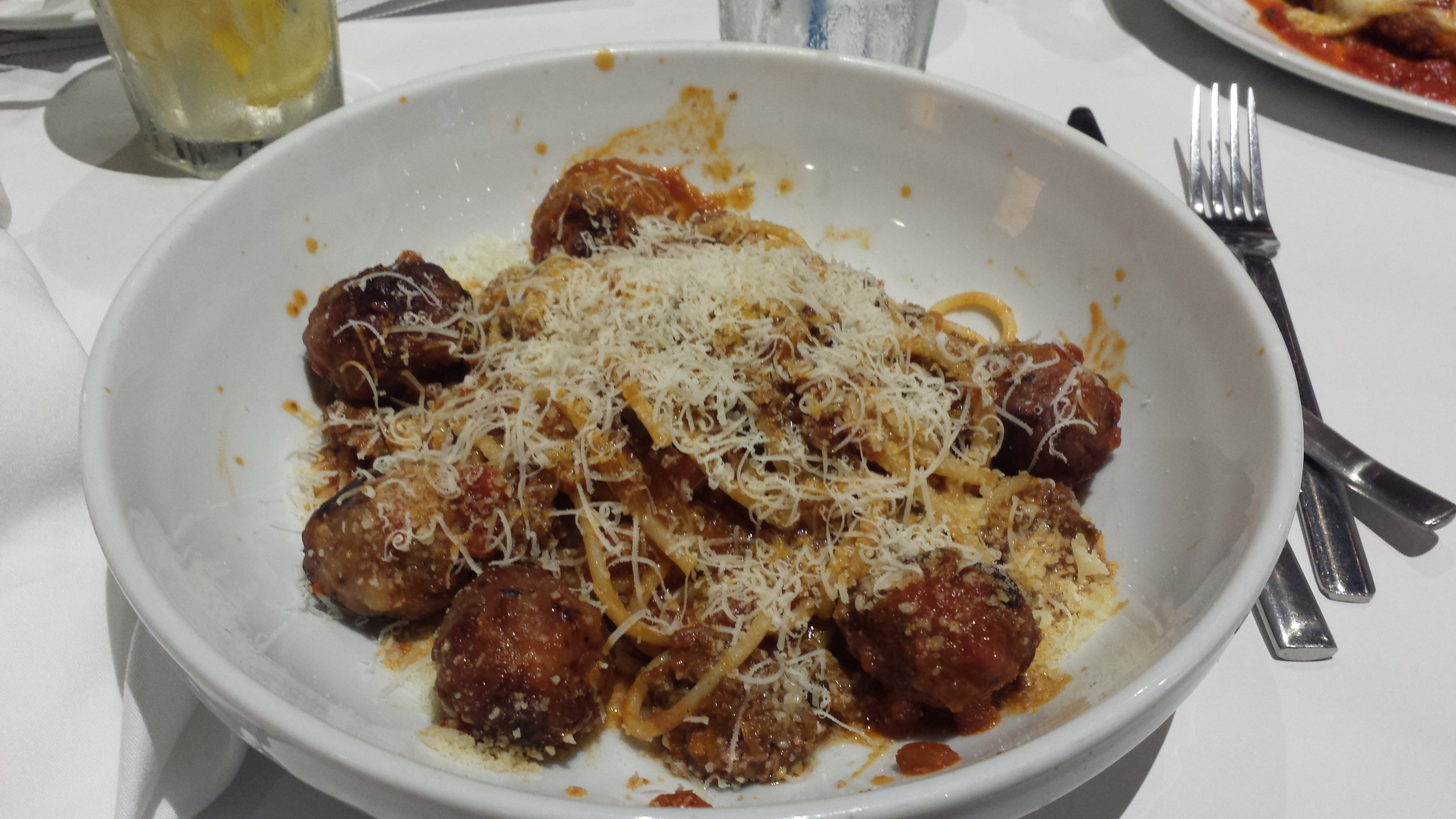
Spaghetti and meatballs
