= Phil Romano =

American restaurateur and entrepreneur

- Occupation: Restaurateur
- Years active: 1965–present
- Known for: Founder of Fuddruckers and Romano's Macaroni Grill

Philip J. Romano is an American restaurateur and entrepreneur. He is best known as the founder of the restaurant chains Fuddruckers and Romano's Macaroni Grill.

== Early life ==
Romano grew up in Auburn, New York. He moved to Florida in his early 20s and then moved from West Palm Beach, Florida, to San Antonio, Texas, in 1976.

== Career ==
Romano has founded multiple restaurant chains with a national or international reach. His biggest successes to date are Fuddruckers, Romano's Macaroni Grill, and EatZi's. Romano has founded more than twenty different restaurant concepts in his career.

Romano was also one of the earliest investors in the heart stent. His initial $250,000 investment returned millions of dollars in royalties.

Romano now runs a number of restaurant incubators in the west Dallas area known as Trinity Groves. He also co-owns an art gallery on Dragon Street in Dallas, Texas, called Samuel Lynne Galleries, named in part after his son, Sam.

== Philanthropy ==
Romano is the co-founder of Hunger Busters with his ex-wife Lille, a Dallas charity that feeds the homeless. Romano stepped away from Hunger Busters in 2018.

== Personal life ==
Romano was married to Lillie Romano (they divorced in 2013), with whom he has a son, Sam. Romano and his son, Sam, live in Dallas, Texas. Romano is listed as an artist and author on the website for Samuel Lynne Galleries in Dallas, Texas.

Romano faced controversy when he used racist language and jokes on one of his restaurants' menus.
