= Greenwood Forest, Texas =

Coordinates: 29°58′31″N 95°30′21″W

Greenwood Forest is an unincorporated area in Harris County, Texas, United States. It is within the Champions region of area 649 acres (263 ha). According to Louis B. Parks of the Houston Chronicle, the commuting distance to Downtown Houston in 2004 was 20 minutes.

== History ==
Kickerillo Organizations created the community beginning in 1970. A municipal utility district was established for it. The City of Houston signed an agreement that prior to 2031 the city government will not annex the area. High level workers for companies focusing in the oil and gas industry settled the area.

In 2008 Habitat for Humanity launched a proposal to build 90 houses in the area, something that the Greenwood Forest community opposed.

== Government and infrastructure ==
The Champions Area Fire Department (Emergency Services District 29) provides fire protection services. It maintains a fire station by the Greenwood Forest clubhouse. Its scheduled area was 26,000 square feet (2,400 m^{2}), and its site is about .33333 acres (0.13489 ha) of land.

Circa 1972, the department built a station, also by the Greenwood Forest clubhouse. Between then and 2009, five portions were added to the building, and Kim Jackson of the Houston Chronicle wrote that by then this building was in poor shape. This was its sole fire station. The department attempted to buy a plot of land from the homeowners association so its new station could go there.

In the beginning of 2004, some residents of Greenwood Forest stated opposition to building a new fire station in Greenwood Forest. In July 2004, the department changed plans and stated it would build a new station, away from Greenwood Forest. However, in October of that year, the department decided that it would continue to seek to build a new station in Greenwood Forest. That month the board of the district agreed to pay $90,000 for the area. It planned to spend $3,000,000 total for the station.

By November 2004, some area residents sued the homeowners' association to prevent it from selling the land. The argument made by the plaintiffs was that the homeowners' association needed to get permission from the people living in the community before selling land.

In November 2007, construction began. In February 2009, the current station opened.

== Education ==
The community is in the Klein Independent School District.

It is zoned to Greenwood Forest Elementary School, Wunderlich Intermediate School, and Klein Forest High School. The elementary school is in Greenwood Forest Section 7.
