= Magic Brands =

Magic Brands, LLC
- Industry: Dining
- Founded: 1998
- Defunct: 2010
- Fate: Bankruptcy; acquired by Luby's
- Successor: Luby's
- Headquarters: Austin, Texas, U.S.
- Products: Fuddruckers and Koo Koo Roo

Magic Brands, LLC was the owner of Fuddruckers and Koo Koo Roo and was based in Austin, Texas. The company acquired Fuddruckers in 1998. On April 22, 2010, Magic Brands filed for Chapter 11 bankruptcy protection. On June 18, 2010, Luby's announced it was buying Fuddruckers and Koo Koo Roo, and the deal eventually was for $61 million in cash via an auction. A second estimate was that the sale amount was for $63 million. Luby's acquisition of Fuddruckers and Koo Koo Roo was finalized during the summer of 2010.
