= Luby's =

American restaurant operator (company)

Luby's Restaurant Corporation
- Trade name: Luby's
- Formerly: Luby's Cafeterias, Inc. (1947–1959; 1981–2005); Cafeterias, Inc. (1959–1981); Lubys, Inc. (2005–2022)
- Type: Private
- Industry: Restaurant
- Genre: Cafeteria
- Founded: 1947; 79 years ago (as Luby's Cafeterias, Inc.); San Antonio, Texas, U.S.
- Founder: Robert M. "Bob" Luby
- Fate: Acquired by Calvin Gin
- Headquarters: Houston, Texas, U.S.
- Number of locations: 38 (January 2025)
- Key people: Christopher J. Pappas (president and CEO); K. Scott Gray (Senior vice-president and CFO); Todd Coutee (COO); B. Todd Coutee (Senior vice-president of operations)
- Products: Homestyle food, cafeteria, American
- Revenue: ▼US$323.47 million (2019)
- Net income: ▲ −US$15.226 million (2019)
- Owner: Calvin Gin
- Number of employees: 6133 (2019)
- Parent: Flying Food Group
- Subsidiaries: Koo Koo Roo (defunct); Cheeseburger in Paradise (defunct); Fuddruckers (2011–2020)
- Website: www.lubys.com

Luby’s Restaurant Corporation is a chain of cafeteria-style restaurants in Texas. In the past, Luby's Inc. also owned the Fuddruckers, Koo Koo Roo, and Cheeseburger in Paradise restaurant chains.

As of April 2024, the company operates 38 locations in Texas. Its headquarters is in the Near Northwest district of Houston, Texas. The original location was founded in 1947 in San Antonio, Texas, by Robert Luby (1910–1998).

Luby's Culinary Services provides contract food-service management to 18 healthcare, higher education, and corporate dining locations, such as Texas Children's Hospital, Lone Star College, and formerly, Baylor College of Medicine, which ended its relationship with Luby's in March 2015.

== History ==
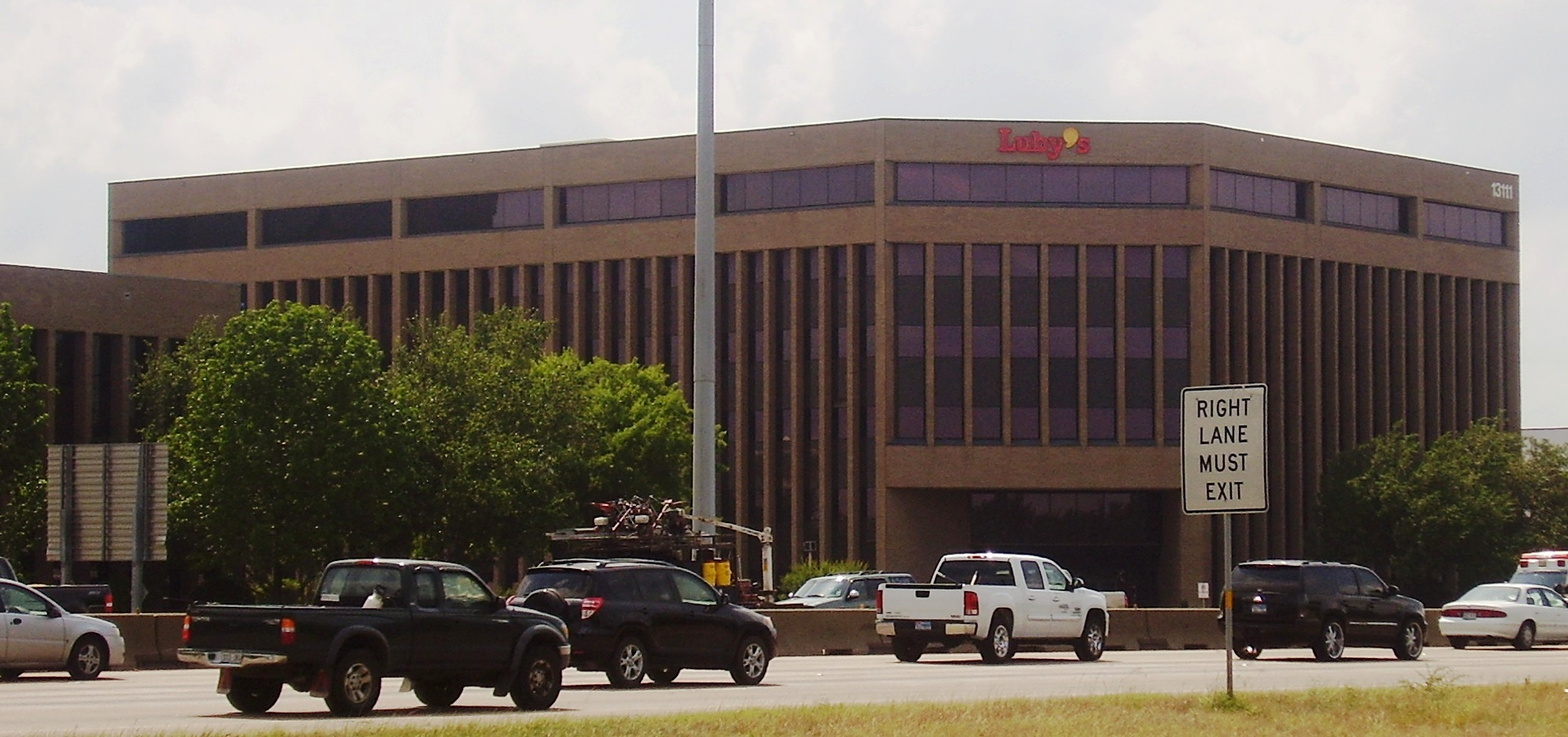
The Luby's headquarters in Near Northwest and in Houston, 2011

Bob Luby's father, Harry, opened his first cafeteria, the New England Dairy Lunch, in 1911, after a business trip to Chicago. By the time Bob was 40, he had become successful, with his cafeterias spreading across several states, and retired to pass the business to his son. Bob worked many jobs in the cafeteria industry before founding Luby's. After graduating from the University of Texas, he ran cafeterias in San Francisco and Corpus Christi. He moved back to Texas after a satisfied customer, Georgina Wenglein, and her husband convinced him to do so. In 1947, Bob opened his first Luby's Cafeteria in the basement of a building in downtown San Antonio, focusing on fresh food and customer service. Luby's soon expanded outside of San Antonio to Tyler, Harlingen, El Paso, and Beaumont.

In 1959, the original partners formed Cafeterias, Inc. Luby's continued to expand, entering other Texas cities and locations in contiguous states. Luby's entered Houston for the first time when it opened the Romana Cafeteria in 1965. Locations opened in New Mexico in 1966 and in Oklahoma in 1980.

In 1973, Cafeterias, Inc., became a publicly traded company. To honor Bob Luby, Cafeterias, Inc., was renamed Luby's Cafeterias, Inc., in 1981. One year later, Luby's shares were listed on the New York Stock Exchange. By 1987, Luby's had reached 100 locations.

The company operated in 11 states in 1996, with over 200 restaurants.

In 2001, Chris and Harris Pappas of Houston's Pappas Restaurants (owners of Pappasito's Cantina, Pappadeaux Seafood Kitchen, etc.) joined the Luby's management team. Three years later, Luby's moved its corporate headquarters from San Antonio to Houston. The addition of the Pappas management team saw several Luby's restaurants begin to transition from traditional cafeteria-style establishments to hybrid cafeteria/fine dining.

Luby's celebrated its 60th anniversary in December 2006 with publishing Luby's Recipes & Memories: A Collection of our Favorite Dishes and Heartwarming Stories. In 2008, Luby's published a special edition of the cookbook that included 12 additional recipes.

In 2009, due to the economic recession, Luby's closed 25 stores and laid off staff as a cost-cutting measure. In 2010, Luby's Culinary Services introduced "What's Brewing?", a coffeehouse concept store in downtown Houston. The same year, on June 18, Luby's announced it was buying Fuddruckers and Koo Koo Roo for $61 million after parent company Magic Brands LLC went bankrupt. On June 13, 2011, Luby's opened its first company-owned Fuddruckers restaurant in downtown Houston's tunnel system. In 2013, Luby's acquired Cheeseburger in Paradise.

In August 2015, 93 Luby's were operating, and this declined to 78 in 2019. Technomic consumer insights senior manager Robert Byrne stated that the fast casual restaurants reduced Luby's market share.

During the 2020 COVID-19 lockdowns, Luby's, Inc. furloughed more than half of its corporate staff and cut the pay of remaining salaried employees by 50%. Luby's Inc also applied for and received a loan of US$10 million as part of the Paycheck Protection Program.

=== Sale of Fuddruckers and acquisition by Calvin Gin ===
On June 3, 2020, Luby's board of directors announced plans to sell all its operating divisions and assets, including real estate assets. This decision was influenced in part by circumstances surrounding the COVID-19 pandemic. Net proceeds from transactions were to benefit Luby's stockholders. The company did not have a definitive timeline for future transactions, but expected to wind down its remaining operations eventually.

On September 8, 2020, Luby's further announced it has adopted a plan to liquidate all of its existing assets, as opposed to operating in the current form or merely selling off divisions.

As of September 11, 2020, 80 Luby's and Fuddruckers were still in operation. About 99% of Luby's stockholders voted for dissolution in November 2020.

On June 21, 2021, Calvin Gin, founder of Flying Food Group, agreed to buy 32 Luby's locations for $28.7 million, a week after Nicholas Perkins of North Carolina agreed to buy Luby's Fuddruckers brand for $18.5 million. Before the announcement of Gin's acquisition, Luby's had planned to close all locations by August 2021.

== Headquarters ==
In July 2004, Luby's announced it would move its headquarters from San Antonio to Houston, where Pappas Restaurants is headquartered. At that time, Luby's had not yet announced where it would move; the company stated that it would most likely relocate to a suburb in Greater Houston; 80 jobs were transferred to Houston. Luby's has its headquarters in Suite 600 of the 13111 Northwest Freeway building in the Near Northwest district in Houston.

== In popular culture ==
A version of the restaurant called "Luly's" is featured in the animated television series King of the Hill. The LuAnn Platter, a popular combination platter served at Luby's, inspired the name of the character Luanne Platter.
