= Jersey Village High School =

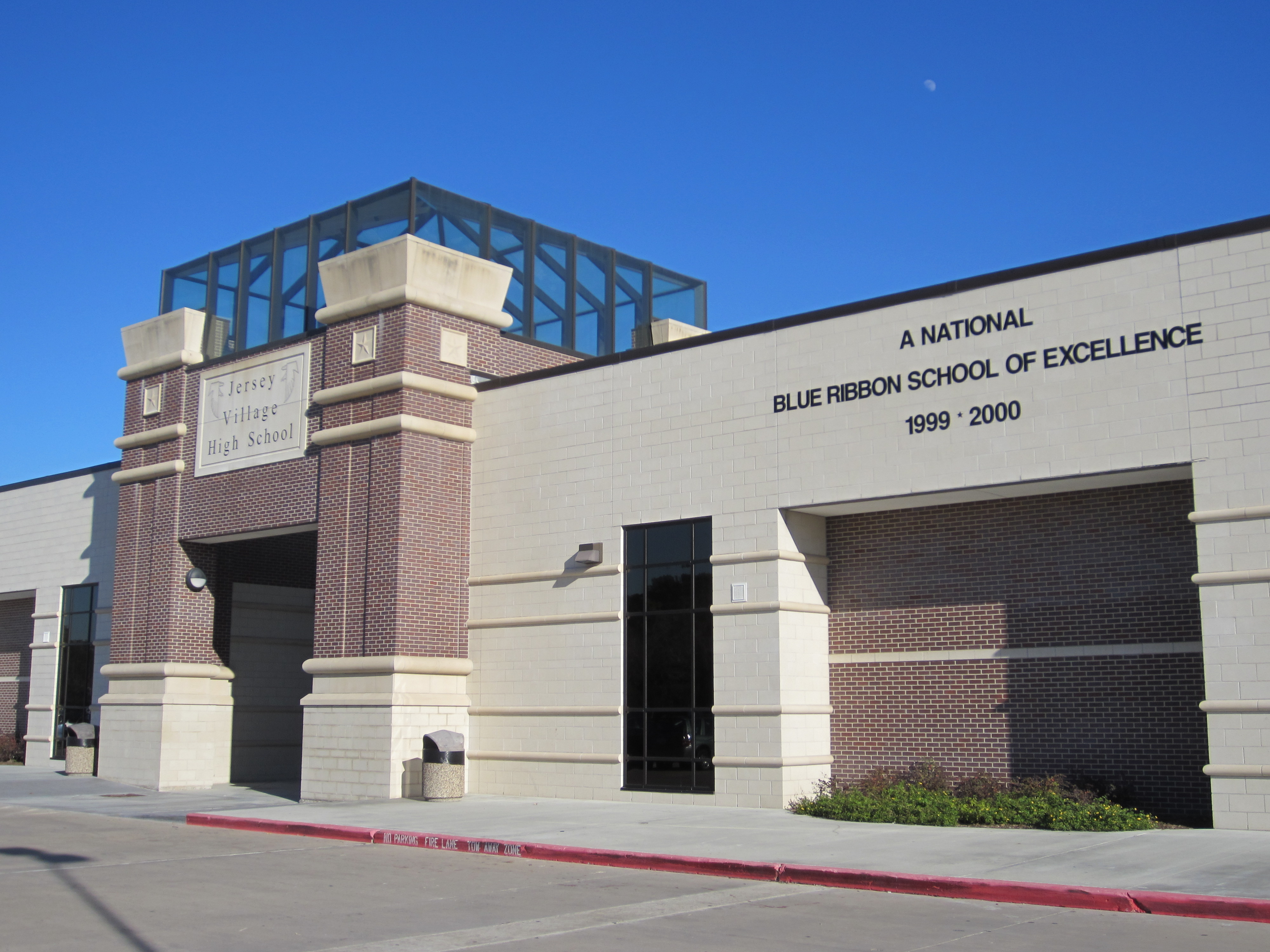

Location
- 7600 Solomon St. Houston, Texas 77040; United States; 29°52′56″N 95°33′21″W

Information
- Type: Public high school
- Established: 1972
- School district: Cypress-Fairbanks Independent School District
- Principal: Maggie Wiley
- Faculty: 221.93 (on an FTE basis)
- Grades: 9-12
- Enrollment: 3,365 (2023–2024)
- Student to teacher ratio: 15.16
- Colors: Purple & gold
- Fight song: "Jersey Village Fight Song"
- Athletics: UIL 6A
- Athletics conference: University Interscholastic League
- Mascot: Falcon
- Newspaper: Peregrine
- Website: Jersey Village High School website

Jersey Village High School is located in Jersey Village, Texas, United States, in the Houston metropolitan area. The school, which serves grades nine through twelve, is a part of the Cypress-Fairbanks ISD. Maggie Wiley serves as its principal, replacing previous Ralph Funk.

Jersey Village High School serves the city of Jersey Village, small sections of Houston, and unincorporated sections of Harris County. A portion of the Near Northwest district is served by the school.

The school mascot is the Falcon, which is similar to the original Atlanta Falcons logo, and the colors are purple and gold.

== History ==
In 1972, Jersey Village High opened its doors to high school students in the area, becoming the second currently standing high school in the Cypress Fairbanks School District, coming after Cy-Fair High School.

To protect teachers, students, and staff from COVID-19, in early 2020, students of Jersey Village High School, as well as the rest of the schools in the district, were moved from a traditional on-campus learning environment and into a remote and online learning program. At the start of the 2020–2021 school year, the district decided to have students and teachers return to campus, a decision which was protested by many teachers in the district, including many at Jersey Village High.

In October 2021, Jersey Village High School's band was one of four bands selected to advance from the UIL Area I Marching Band Contest.

== Academics ==
Jersey Village was named a National Blue Ribbon School in 1999–2000. In the 2018–19 school year, the school received a B grade from the Texas Education Agency, with an overall score of 86 out of 100.

== Demographics ==
The demographic breakdown of the 3,346 students enrolled for 2020–21 was:

- African American: 11.4%
- Hispanic: 59.6%
- White: 13.7%
- Native American: 0.5%
- Asian: 12.5%
- Pacific Islander: 0.1%
- Two or more races: 2.2%

59.4% of Jersey Village students were eligible for free or reduced-price lunches.

== Notable alumni ==
- Adger Armstrong, professional football player, Houston Oilers and Tampa Bay Buccaneers, class of 1976
- Howie Behrens, guitarist for Pushmonkey, class of 1988
- Joseph Cao, first Vietnamese-American to be elected to Congress
- Chamillionaire, rapper, class of 1998
- Ryan Delahoussaye, musician, member of the band Blue October
- Sandy Gbandi, MLS, class of 2002
- Paul Jetton, NFL football player, class of 1983
- Joseph Kahn, film director, class of 1990
- Lindsey Morgan, actress, class of 2008
- Chris Paul, professional football player for the Washington Commanders, class of 2017
- Patrick Paul, professional football player for the Miami Dolphins
- Nick Stavinoha, professional baseball player for the St. Louis Cardinals
- Kaylynne Truong, basketball player
- Paul Wall, rapper, class of 1998
- Selvin Young, NFL, Denver Broncos, class of 2002
