= Koo Koo Roo =

American fast casual restaurant chain

- Type: Independent
- Industry: Restaurants
- Founded: 1988; 38 years ago in Los Angeles, California
- Founders: Mike and Ray Badalian
- Defunct: 2014; 12 years ago
- Fate: Closed by parent
- Headquarters: Los Angeles, California, US; Houston, Texas, U.S.
- Area served: California, Florida, Nevada, New Jersey, Bayside New York
- Parent: Magic Brands (2003–2010); Luby's (2010–2014); Independent (2021-present)
- Website: Last archive of official website (2014)

Koo Koo Roo was an American fast casual restaurant chain specializing in charbroiled chicken founded in 1988 by Los Angeles-based restaurateurs Mike and Ray Badalian. The name "Koo Koo Roo" was an onomatopoeic reference to the crow of a rooster. After a series of expansions and ownership changes, in which Koo Koo Roo struggled for profitability throughout the 1990s, the last location in Santa Monica, California, closed in 2014.

In 2021, Luby's Restaurants, Inc. sold the Koo Koo Roo brand to an independent third party, owned and controlled by Daniel Farasat. (Note: Ruggless, Ron (2021-04-27). "Luby's continues to wind down cafeteria, Fuddruckers operations". Nation's Restaurant News. ISSN 0028-0518. Archived from the original on 2022-06-05.)

== History ==
The Badalian brothers originally ran two locations in Los Angeles, one in Koreatown and the other on Beverly Boulevard close to the Beverly Center. The brothers opened their first restaurant in 1988 on west Sixth Street near Normandie Avenue in Los Angeles. The restaurant served skinless chicken that was marinated in vegetable juices and char-broiled over open flames and served with a fold-able Middle Eastern inspired flatbread that they called "Koo Koo Roo bread." The only sides available were a Middle Eastern cucumber and onion salad, an eggplant salad, and a mixture of pinto and Northern beans. The only dessert initially available was frozen yogurt. Everything on the initial menu had relative low calories when compared to offerings at other chicken restaurants. (Note: Dosti, Rose (1988-08-25). "Koo Koo Roo: Something to Crow About". Los Angeles Times. ISSN 2165-1736. OCLC 3638237. Archived from the original on 2022-06-05.)

On the evening of March 26, 1990, Kenneth Berg, a retired real estate broker from New York, stopped at the Beverly Boulevard location to get dinner, particularly a meal for him to take home while he watched the 62nd Academy Awards. Impressed by the quality of the food, Berg met with the Badalians and later invested US$2,500,000 as a silent partner, eventually investing more and taking control of the restaurant. The following year, the company became public with its stock being traded on NASDAQ under the stock ticker KKRO. (Note: "Koo Koo Roo, Inc. History". Funding Universe.)

The company had 15 locations in February 1992. Two years later, the number of locations had dropped to 8. (Note: Petruno, Tom (1994-08-26). "Leg Room for 1 More Chicken Chain? Milken Trust Thinks So". Los Angeles Times. ISSN 2165-1736. OCLC 3638237. Archived from the original on 2022-06-05.)

In a bid to diversify the company, Koo Koo Roo launched a coffee bar chain called Arrosto Coffee Co. and acquired a color-your-own-ceramics chain called Color Me Mine in 1996. (Note: Vrana, Debora; Petruno, Tom (1998-01-29). "Koo Koo Roo Shares Plummet". Los Angeles Times. ISSN 2165-1736. OCLC 3638237. Archived from the original on 2022-06-05.) The following year, Koo Koo Roo acquired the bankrupted 14-outlet Hamburger Hamlet chain for US$11.5 million. (Note: Peltz, James F. (1997-03-07). "Koo Koo Roo Plans to Take 14 Hamlets Under Its Wing". Los Angeles Times. ISSN 2165-1736. OCLC 3638237. Archived from the original on 2022-06-05.)

After suffering financial problems during the previous three years, the company was acquired by Family Restaurants Inc., the owner of Chi-Chi's and El Torito Mexican restaurants, in 1998 for $143 million in stock. At the time of the announcement, Koo Koo Roo had 38 locations in California, Florida, and Nevada. Before the acquisition was completed, Koo Koo Roo sold off its Arrosto Coffee Co. and Color Me Mine chains. (Note: "Koo Koo Roo: Add salsa". CNN. New York City. CNNfn. 1998-06-10. Archived from the original on 2022-06-05.) (Note: Gregory, Stephen (1998-08-26). "Koo Koo Roo Sells Color Me Mine Stores". Los Angeles Times. ISSN 2165-1736. OCLC 3638237.)

Immediate after Family Restaurants completed the acquisition of the Koo Koo Roo and Hamburger Hamlet chains, Family Restaurants Inc., renamed itself Koo Koo Roo Enterprises and then Prandium Inc. a few months later. Prandium was the parent company for the Koo Koo Roo, El Torito, Chi-Chi's and Hamburger Hamlet chains. (Note: Hernandez, Greg (1999-04-17). "Koo Koo Roo Enterprises Becomes Prandium Inc". Los Angeles Times. ISSN 2165-1736. OCLC 3638237. Archived from the original on 2022-06-05.)

By January 1999, Koo Koo Roo had 40 locations.

In 2003, the Prandium subsidiaries Koo Koo Roo, Chi-Chi's, and Hamburger Hamlet, filed for Chapter 11 bankruptcy protection. At the time of the filing, Koo Koo Roo had 28 locations, down from 38 in 2001. (Note: Robinson-Jacobs, Karen (2003-10-09). "Chi-Chi's, Koo Koo Roo Enter Bankruptcy Court". Los Angeles Times. ISSN 2165-1736. OCLC 3638237. Archived from the original on 2022-06-05.) As the result of the filing, the company was acquired by Magic Brands. Three years later, the number of locations dropped to 13 before Magic Brands closed an additional 10 locations. (Note: Bernstein, Sharon (2010-04-29). "Koo Koo Roo to close 10 stores in state". Los Angeles Times. ISSN 2165-1736. OCLC 3638237. Archived from the original on 2022-06-05.) Luby's acquired Koo Koo Roo and its remaining 3 locations in 2010 after parent Magic Brands filed for bankruptcy. (Note: Olivarez-Giles, Nathan (2010-06-18). "Luby's cafeteria to buy Fuddruckers and Koo Koo Roo for $61 million". Los Angeles Times. ISSN 2165-1736. OCLC 3638237. Archived from the original on 2022-06-05.)

=== Relaunch ===
In 2024, it was announced that the brand will officially return under new ownership led by Daniel Farasat, independent of his real estate firm, Tiger West Capital LLC. New brick-and-mortar locations are planned to open beginning in late 2025.

== See also ==
- List of chicken restaurants
- List of fast-food chicken restaurants
