= Forest Pines =

Coordinates: 53.554°N 0.567°W

- Interactive map of Forest Pines

Club information
- Location: Scunthorpe, United Kingdom
- Type: Private
- Owner: KSL Capital Partners
- Operator: QHotels Collection
- Total holes: 27
- Website: Forest Pines website

Forest
- Designed by: John Morgan
- Par: 37
- Length: 3353

Pines
- Designed by: John Morgan
- Par: 36
- Length: 3551

Beeches
- Designed by: John Morgan
- Par: 35
- Length: 3102

Forest Pines

General information
- Location: Scunthorpe, United Kingdom
- Opening: 1996
- Owner: KSL Capital Partners
- Operator: QHotels Collection

Other information
- Number of rooms: 188
- Number of restaurants: 3

Website
- Forest Pines website

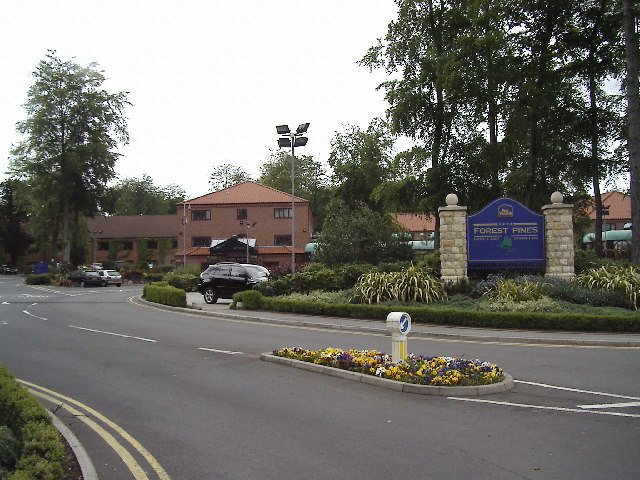

Forest Pines is a 27-hole British golf resort and hotel east of Scunthorpe in North Lincolnshire. Lying close to the village of Broughton it occupies the former Briggate Lodge site.

== Resort ==
Opened in 1988 by David Middleton, Forest Pines is marketed as a luxury golf and country club hotel. It is set in 190 acres of woodland. The resort contains an 18-metre indoor pool, spa, and gym facilities. Golf courses were added from 1996.

== Golf courses ==
The course was designed by the ex-European Tour player John Morgan and consists of three loops of nine holes: Forest, Pines, and Beeches. The Forest-Pines combination is the most challenging, with a course rating of 73.5 and a slope rating of 149 when playing off the white championship tees. The Pines course has a slope rating of 153, which is one of the highest in the United Kingdom, and close to the maximum possible value of 155.

- Forest - par 37
- Pines - par 36
- Beeches - par 35 (white tees), par 34 (yellow tees)

Forest Pines has hosted the R&A Boys Home Internationals, British Blind Open and PGA Championships between 2009 and 2013.

=== Guinness World Record ===
In 2006, a British schoolgirl was the youngest female to record a hole in one. Kate Langley was credited with making a 1 on the 134-yard par 3 on the Beeches course on 9 August. She was 9 years, 166 days old and had been playing for less than a year.

=== Professional events ===
- 2026 PGA Super 60's

== Awards ==
- 2018 Best Golf Course in East of England
