= Jersey Village, Texas =

City of Jersey Village
- City
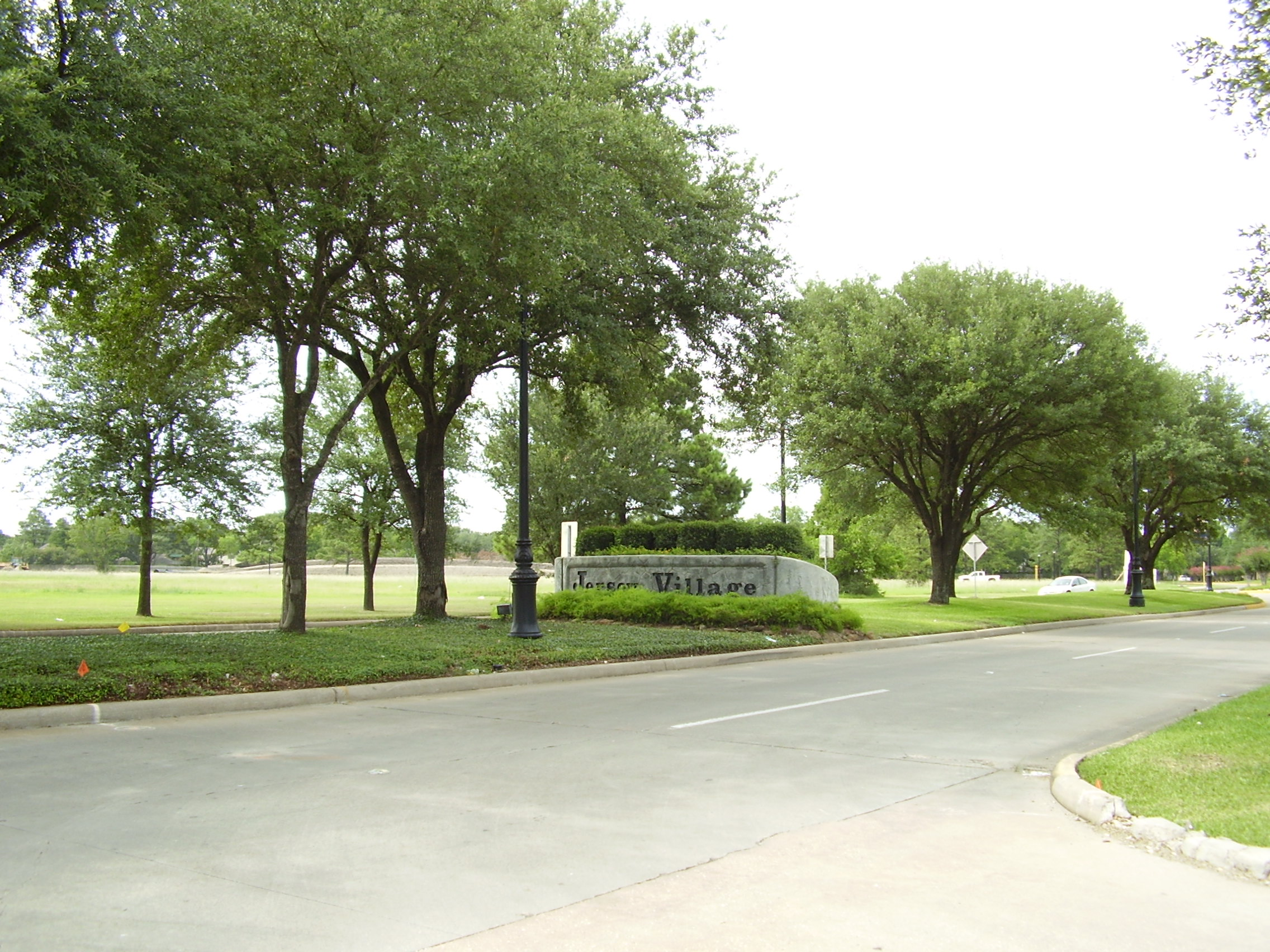
- Entrance to Jersey Village

- Location in Harris County and the state of Texas
- Coordinates: 29°53′26″N 95°34′7″W
- Country: United States
- State: Texas
- County: Harris
- Incorporated: April 16, 1956

Government
  - Mayor: Bobby Warren

Area
  - Total: 3.43 sq mi (8.88 km^{2})
  - Land: 3.38 sq mi (8.75 km^{2})
  - Water: 0.050 sq mi (0.13 km^{2})
- Elevation: 110 ft (33.5 m)

Population (2020)
  - Total: 7,921
  - Density: 2,335/sq mi (901.7/km^{2})
- Time zone: UTC-6 (CST)
  - Summer (DST): UTC-5 (CDT)
- ZIP codes: 77040, 77041, 77065
- Area code: 713
- FIPS code: 48-37612
- GNIS feature ID: 1360232
- Website: www.jerseyvillage.gov

Jersey Village is a city in west-central Harris County, Texas, United States, located at U.S. Highway 290, Farm to Market Road 529, and the Southern Pacific Railroad. The city is located in the Houston–Pasadena–The Woodlands metropolitan area. The population was 7,921 at the 2020 census.

== History ==
The 1936 Harris County highway map indicated several residences in the area. Clark W. Henry owned 1,236 acres (5.00 km^{2}) of land on which he operated F&M Dairy and raised Jersey cattle. Henry discontinued his dairy when his health declined, and he gave the land up so a residential community could be built in 1953. Henry and LeRoy Kennedy, members of the Garden Oaks Baptist Church, began developing the community in February 1954. At first, the city had 5 miles (8 km) of streets and drainage, gas, sewage, and water services. Several houses were established along Jersey Drive. The first family moved to the subdivision in late October 1954. The community developed a school, a park, and an 18-hole golf course. Jersey Village incorporated on April 16, 1956, with all 58 votes in favor of incorporation and a volunteer police force. Because of the incorporation, Houston did not incorporate Jersey Village's territory into its city limits.

In 1961, Jersey Village had 493 residents. On July 6, 1972, Leonard Rauch gave Jersey Village a city hall building; as of 2008 the building was used for the fire department and public works departments. In 1977 the city passed a bond issue, leading it to construct a new city hall, a city garage, a park pavilion, and an expansion of the fire department building. In 1980, the city had 966 residents. In 1982, this figure increased to 4,084. In August 1986, officials announced that the city passed a home rule charter, with a passing vote of 306–36. Under a home rule charter, Jersey Village gained more taxation and governing powers than it had as a general law city. In 1988 the population increased to 5,143. In 1990 Jersey Village had 4,938 residents.

== Geography ==
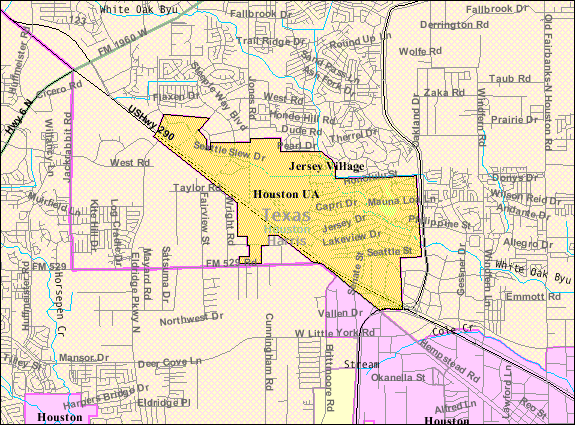
Map of Jersey Village

Jersey Village is located at 29°53′26″N 95°34′7″W (29.890569, –95.568579).

According to the United States Census Bureau, the city has a total area of 3.5 square miles (9.1 km^{2}), of which 3.4 square miles (8.8 km^{2}) is land and 0.04 square miles (0.10 km^{2}), or 0.87%, is water.

== Demographics ==
Historical population
Census	Pop.	Note	%±
1960	493		—
1970	765		55.2%
1980	4,084		433.9%
1990	4,826		18.2%
2000	6,880		42.6%
2010	7,620		10.8%
2020	7,921		4.0%
U.S. Decennial Census

=== Racial and ethnic composition ===
Jersey Village city, Texas – Racial and ethnic composition Note: the US Census treats Hispanic/Latino as an ethnic category. This table excludes Latinos from the racial categories and assigns them to a separate category. Hispanics/Latinos may be of any race.
Race / Ethnicity (NH = Non-Hispanic)	Pop 2000	Pop 2010	Pop 2020	% 2000	% 2010	% 2020
White alone (NH)	5,635	5,096	4,113	81.90%	66.88%	51.93%
Black or African American alone (NH)	278	618	906	4.04%	8.11%	11.44%
Native American or Alaska Native alone (NH)	15	21	14	0.22%	0.28%	0.18%
Asian alone (NH)	350	657	812	5.09%	8.62%	10.25%
Native Hawaiian or Pacific Islander alone (NH)	3	0	2	0.04%	0.00%	0.03%
Other race alone (NH)	10	15	24	0.15%	0.20%	0.30%
Mixed race or Multiracial (NH)	90	104	299	1.31%	1.36%	3.77%
Hispanic or Latino (any race)	499	1,109	1,751	7.25%	14.55%	22.11%
Total	6,880	7,620	7,921	100.00%	100.00%	100.00%

=== 2020 census ===
As of the 2020 census, there were 7,921 people, 3,476 households, and 2,217 families residing in the city.

The median age was 42.2 years. 17.8% of residents were under the age of 18 and 21.8% of residents were 65 years of age or older. For every 100 females there were 91.8 males, and for every 100 females age 18 and over there were 89.4 males age 18 and over.

100.0% of residents lived in urban areas, while 0.0% lived in rural areas.

There were 3,476 households in Jersey Village, of which 26.6% had children under the age of 18 living in them. Of all households, 50.7% were married-couple households, 16.3% were households with a male householder and no spouse or partner present, and 27.5% were households with a female householder and no spouse or partner present. About 30.2% of all households were made up of individuals and 12.0% had someone living alone who was 65 years of age or older.

There were 3,745 housing units, of which 7.2% were vacant. The homeowner vacancy rate was 1.2% and the rental vacancy rate was 11.0%.

Racial composition as of the 2020 census
Race	Number	Percent
White	4,543	57.4%
Black or African American	942	11.9%
American Indian and Alaska Native	42	0.5%
Asian	815	10.3%
Native Hawaiian and Other Pacific Islander	3	0.0%
Some other race	515	6.5%
Two or more races	1,061	13.4%
Hispanic or Latino (of any race)	1,751	22.1%

=== 2000 census ===
As of the census of 2000, there were 6,880 people, 2,840 households, and 1,942 families residing in the city. The population density was 2,014.3 inhabitants per square mile (777.7/km^{2}). There were 3,037 housing units at an average density of 889.2 per square mile (343.3/km^{2}). The racial makeup of the city was 86.6% White, 4.1% African American, 0.1% Native American, 5.09% Asian, 0.06% Pacific Islander, 2.43% from other races, and 1.51% from two or more races. Hispanic or Latino of any race were 7.3% of the population.

There were 2,840 households, out of which 29.0% had children under the age of 18 living with them, 59.6% were married couples living together, 6.2% had a female householder with no husband present, and 31.6% were non-families. 24.8% of all households were made up of individuals, and 2.5% had someone living alone who was 65 years of age or older. The average household size was 2.42 and the average family size was 2.94.

In the city, the population was spread out, with 22.0% under the age of 18, 8.8% from 18 to 24, 31.6% from 25 to 44, 30.0% from 45 to 64, and 7.6% who were 65 years of age or older. The median age was 38 years. For every 100 females, there were 97.9 males. For every 100 females age 18 and over, there were 96.5 males.

The median income for a household in the city was $68,431, and the median income for a family was $82,689. Males had a median income of $53,984 versus $37,616 for females. The per capita income for the city was $36,092. About 3.4% of families and 4.5% of the population were below the poverty line, including 6.4% of those under age 18 and 5.8% of those age 65 or over.

== Government ==
=== Local government ===
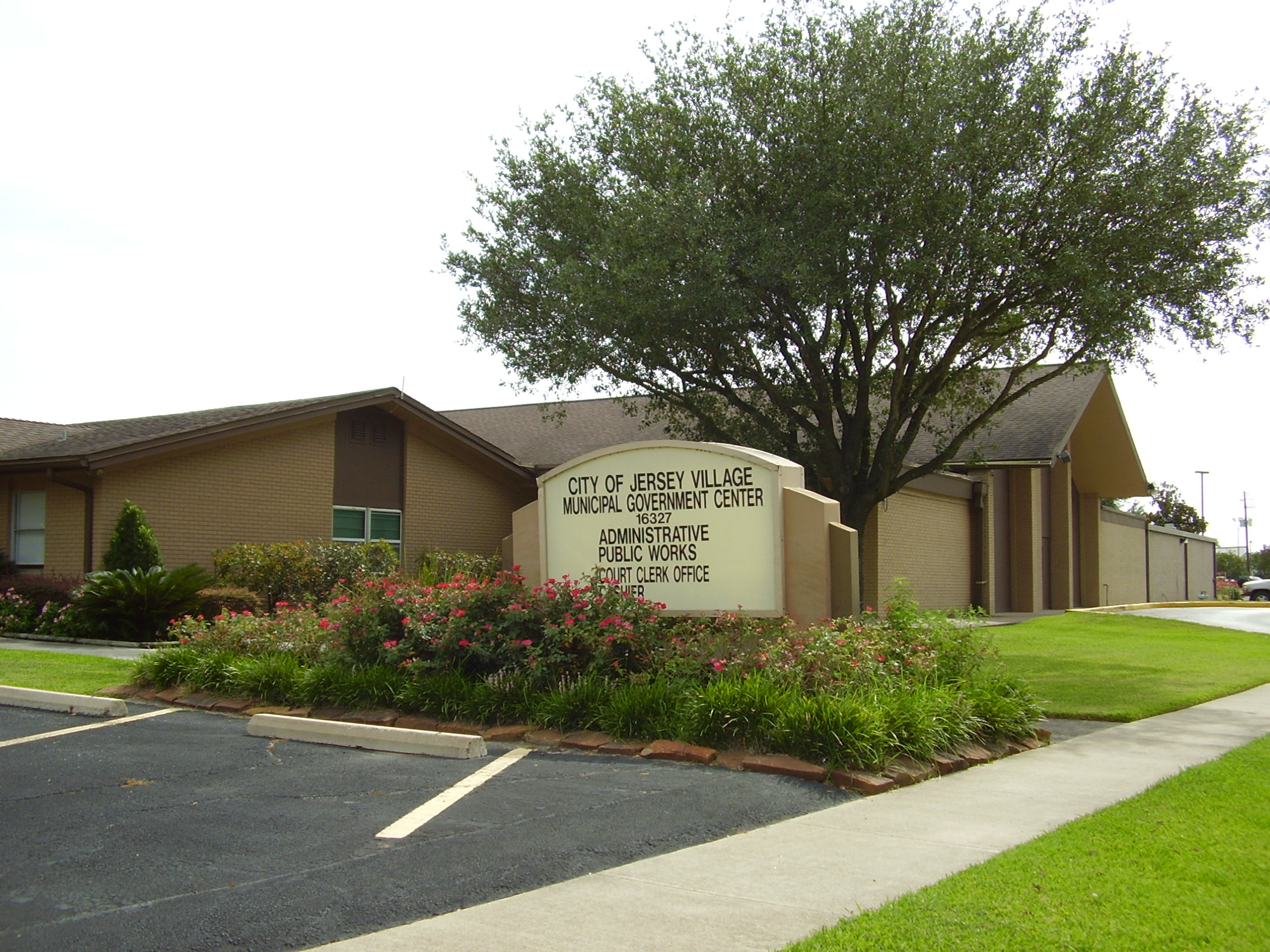
Municipal Government Center

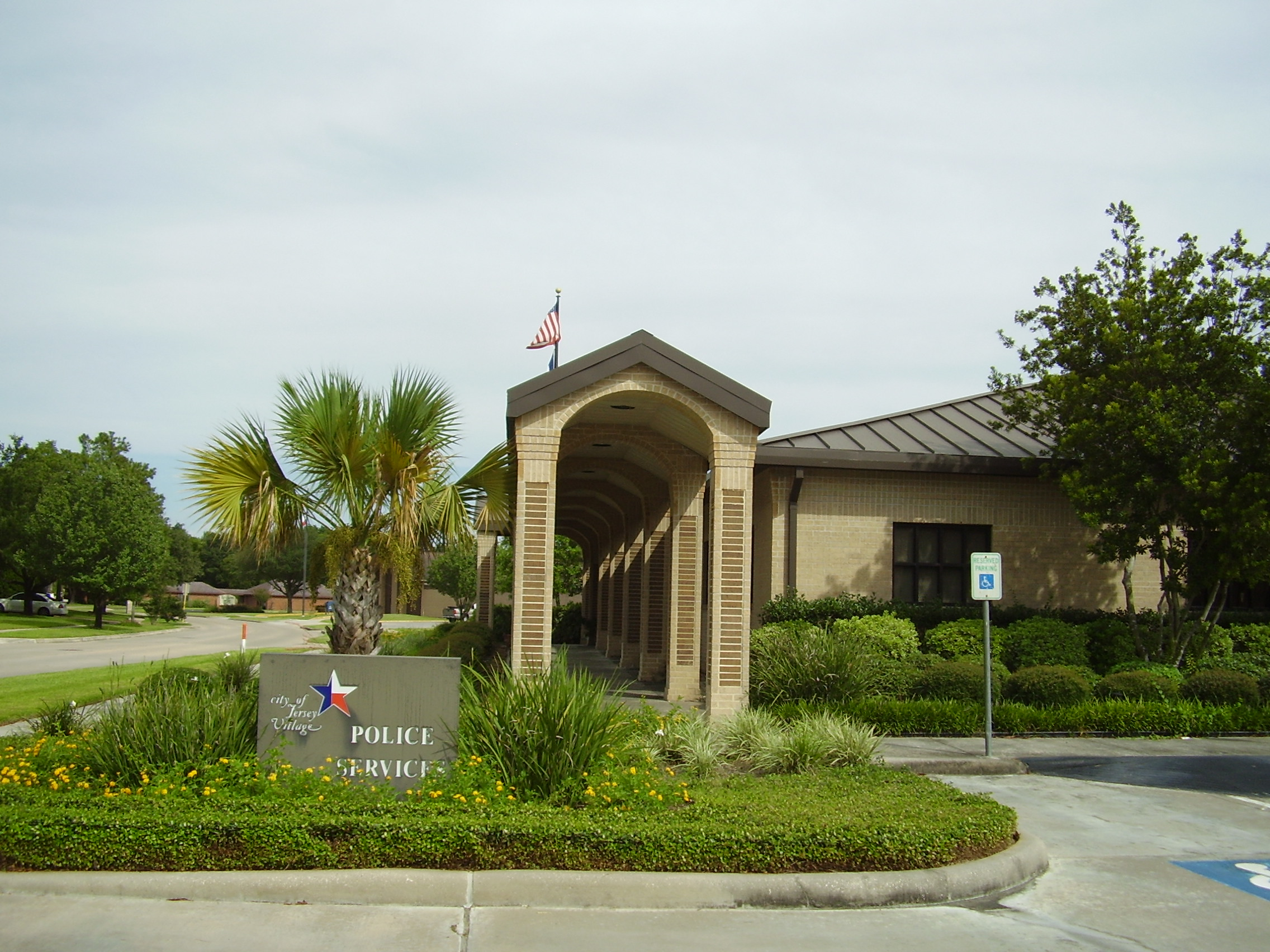
Police Services

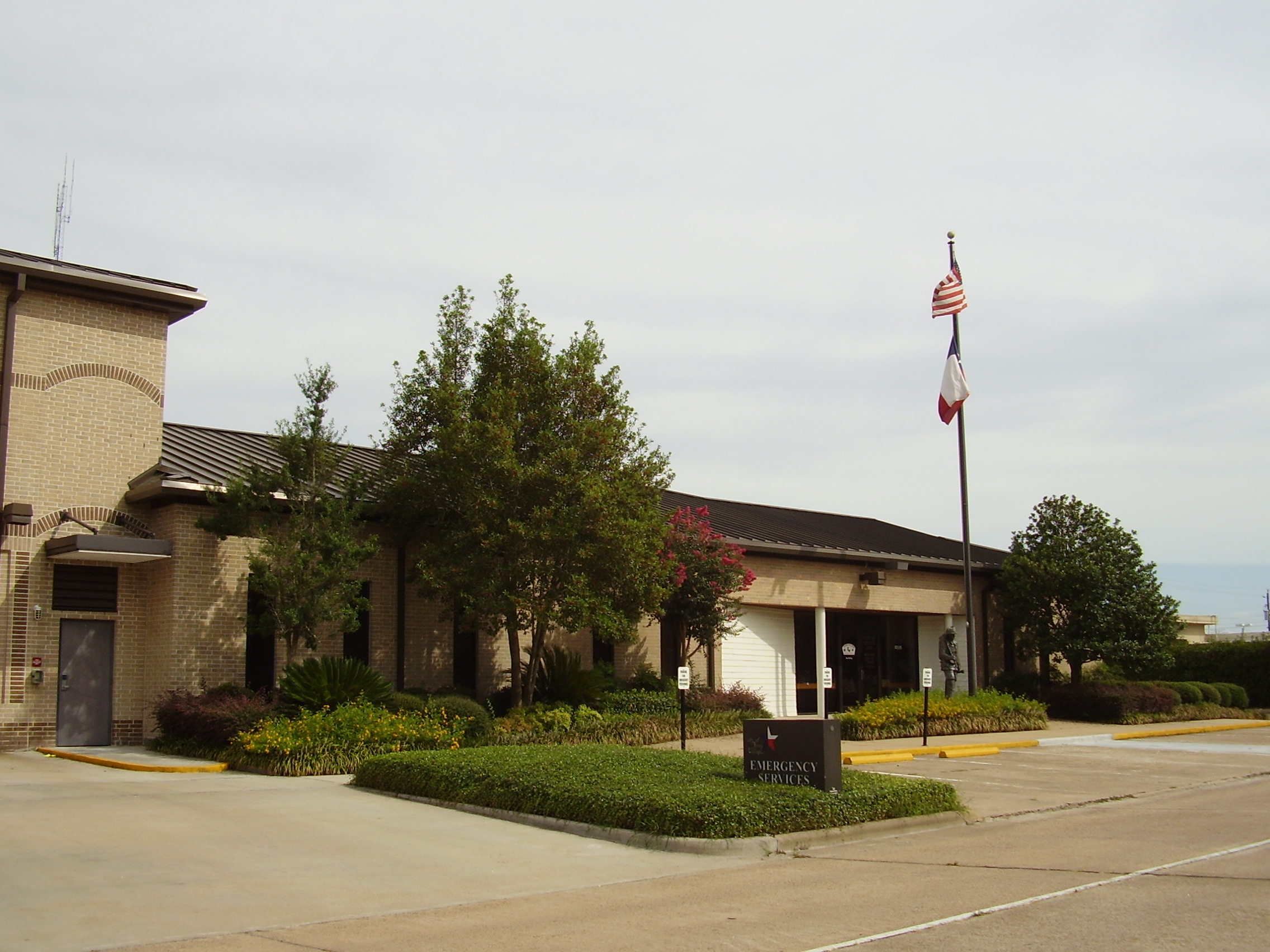
Emergency Services and Fire Department Administration Building

Jersey Village has a home rule charter and a council manager form of government. The city manager acts as the city's chief executive officer. The council, consisting of the mayor and five elected members, serves as the city's legislative body and votes on matters related to city government. The mayor and each council member have two year terms. Each member is limited to four terms as mayor, council member, or both. The mayor votes if the city council has a tie vote. The city manager has no voice in the city council; the city manager attends all council meetings and provides advice. The city manager manages all city affairs assigned to the city manager by the charter, implements city council directives, and ordinances. The city manager also manages and directs the city organization and employees. As of March 2017, the city manager is Austin Bleess.

The council meets during the third Monday of each month at 7:00 PM in the auditorium of the Civic Center, which is located at 16327 Lakeview Drive. The city government, through its City Secretary, Lorri Coody, posts the council agendas 72 hours in advance on the city website and on its official bulletin board in the city. As of May 2021, the Mayor is Bobby Warren and the elected Council Members are Michelle Mitcham (Mayor Pro Tem), Drew Wasson, Sheri Sheppard, Connie Rossi, and Jennifer McCrea. Each Council Member is also appointed as a liaison to various city boards and commissions. Council Member Mitcham is assigned as Liaison to the Recreation and Events Committee, Council Member Sheppard is assigned as Liaison to the Golf Course Advisory Committee, Council Member McCrea is assigned as liaison to the Building Board of Adjustment and Appeals, and the Zoning Board of Adjustment, Council Member Rossi is assigned as Liaison to Tax Increment Reinvestment Zone Nos. 2 and 3, and Council Member Wasson is assigned as Liaison to the Planning and Zoning Commission and the Capital Improvements Advisory Committee. As of February 2024 the Chief of Police is Danny Keele. Jersey Village Fire Department provides firefighting and EMS services to city residents. As of 2008 Mark Bitz serves as the Fire Chief.

=== County, state and federal representation ===
Jersey Village is within Harris County Precinct 3. Tom S. Ramsey, P.E. heads the precinct.

The city includes a regional office of the Texas Department of Public Safety.

Jersey Village is located in District 135 of the Texas House of Representatives. As of 2019, John Rosenthal represents the district. Jersey Village is within District 7 of the Texas Senate; as of 2015 Paul Bettencourt represents the district.

Jersey Village is in Texas's 7th congressional district. As of 2018, Lizzie Fletcher represents the district. The United States Postal Service operates the nearby Fairbanks Post Office at 7050 Brookhollow West Drive in an unincorporated area. The zip code is 77040.

Postal addresses in Jersey Village are designated as "Houston, Texas." Using "Jersey Village, Texas" is acceptable for Jersey Village addresses.

== Education ==
=== Primary and secondary schools ===
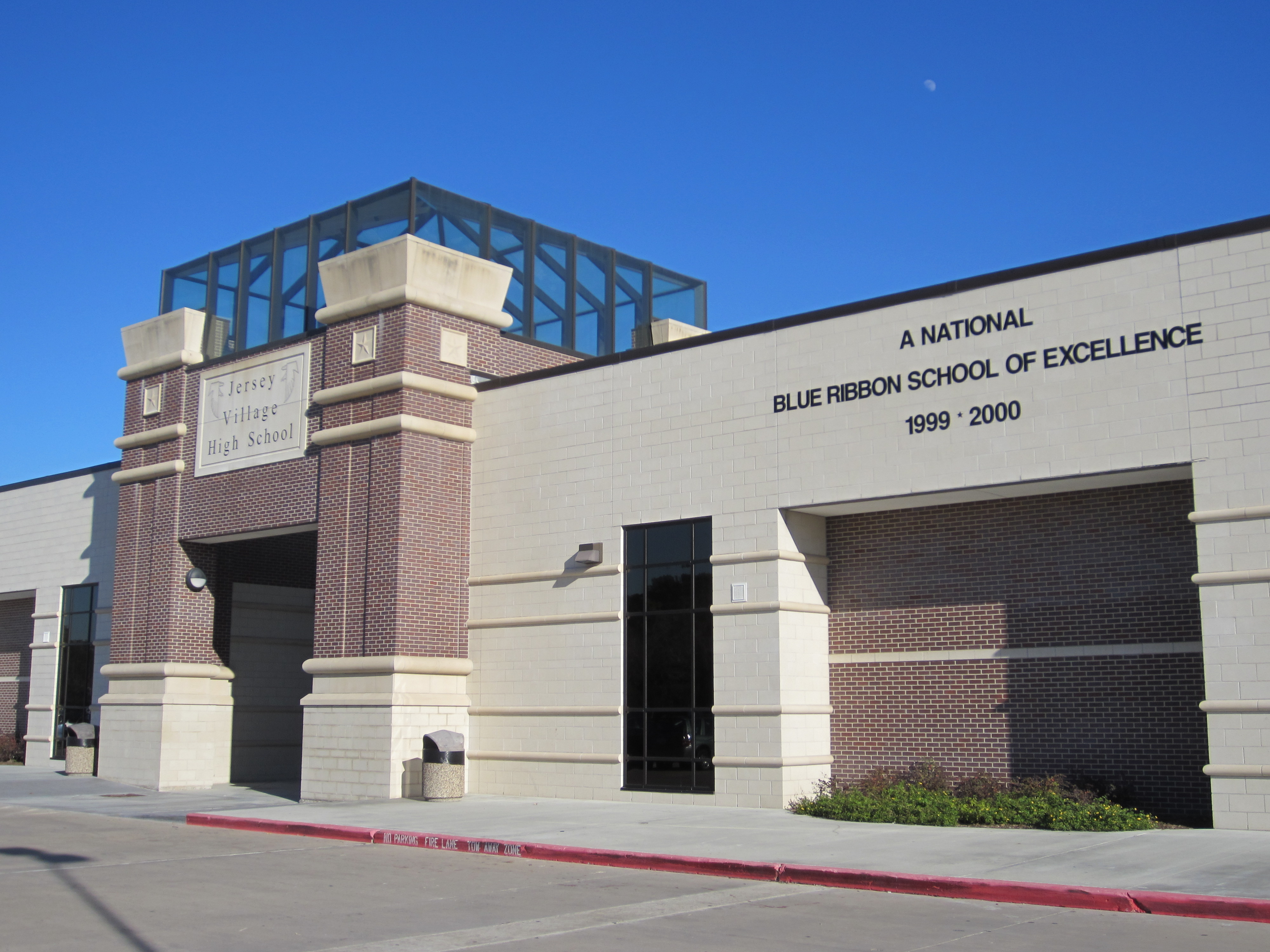
Jersey Village High School

Jersey Village is served by Cypress-Fairbanks Independent School District. Jersey Village's residential areas are zoned to Post Elementary School, which is located in Jersey Village. Students continue on to Cook Middle School in unincorporated Harris County and Jersey Village High School in Jersey Village. Some areas within the Jersey Village city limits are zoned to other elementary and middle schools, but this is without real significance as these areas currently have no residents.

When Jersey Village opened, children originally went to Cy-Fair High School for schooling. A high school site opened in Jersey Village, and Jersey Village High School opened in 1972.

==== Gallery of schools ====
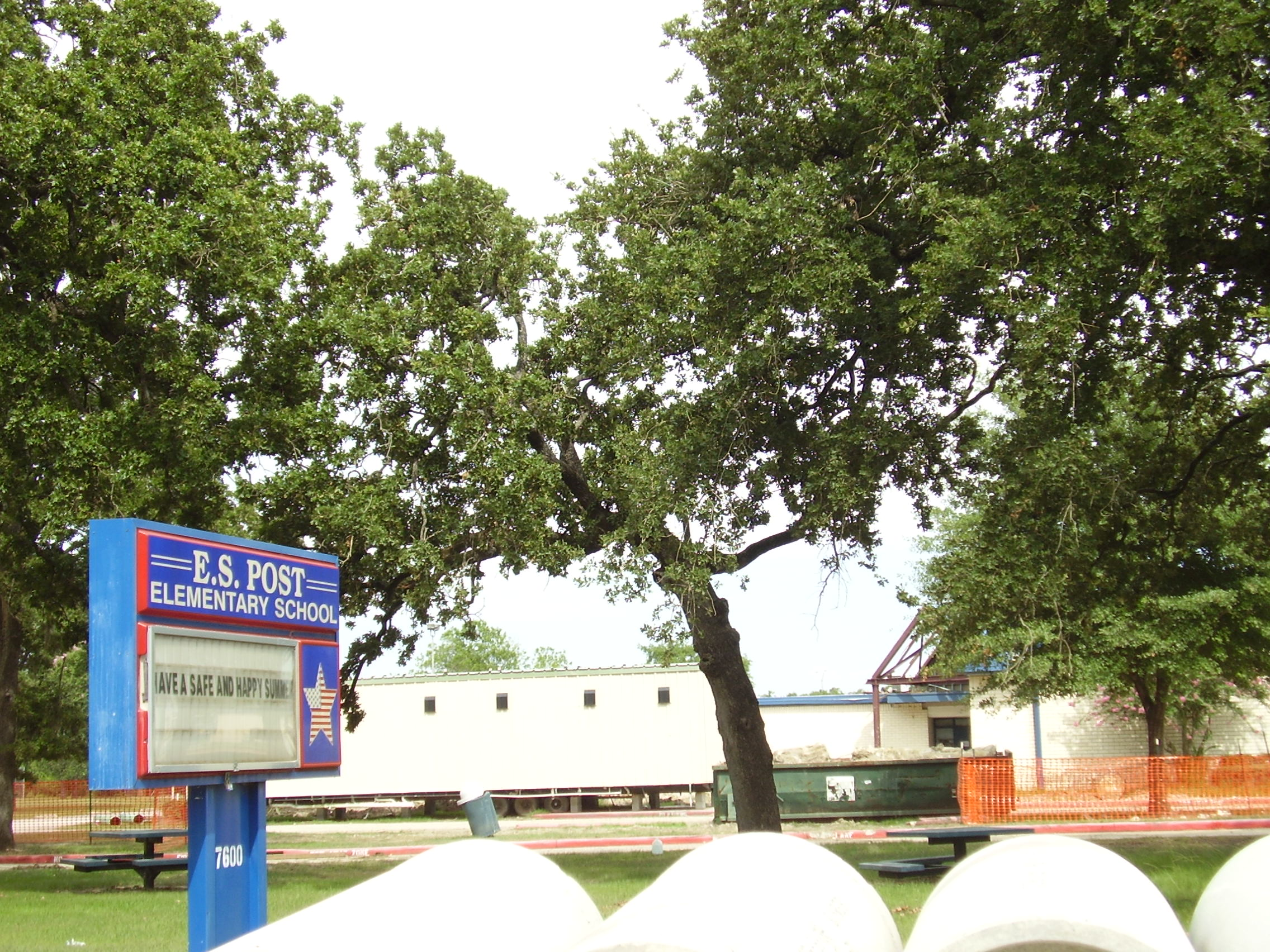
E. S. Post Elementary School (Under construction)

=== Colleges and universities ===
Lone Star College (originally the North Harris Montgomery Community College District) serves the community. The territory in Cypress-Fairbanks ISD joined the community college district in 2000. The Texas Legislature has designated CFISD as being in the Lone Star district. The system operates the Fairbanks Center in unincorporated Harris County; Fairbanks Center is a part of Lone Star College–CyFair.

== Recreation ==
Jersey Village offers residents a variety of recreational activities. The town has a golf course, and public park with playground facilities. There is also a small lake owned and maintained by a Homeowners Association with fishing available to residents and guests who have homes on the shores of the lake.

== Notable person ==
- Gary Elkins, Republican member of the Texas House of Representatives from District 135 in Harris County from 1995 to 2018; defeated for re-election in 2018

== Gallery ==
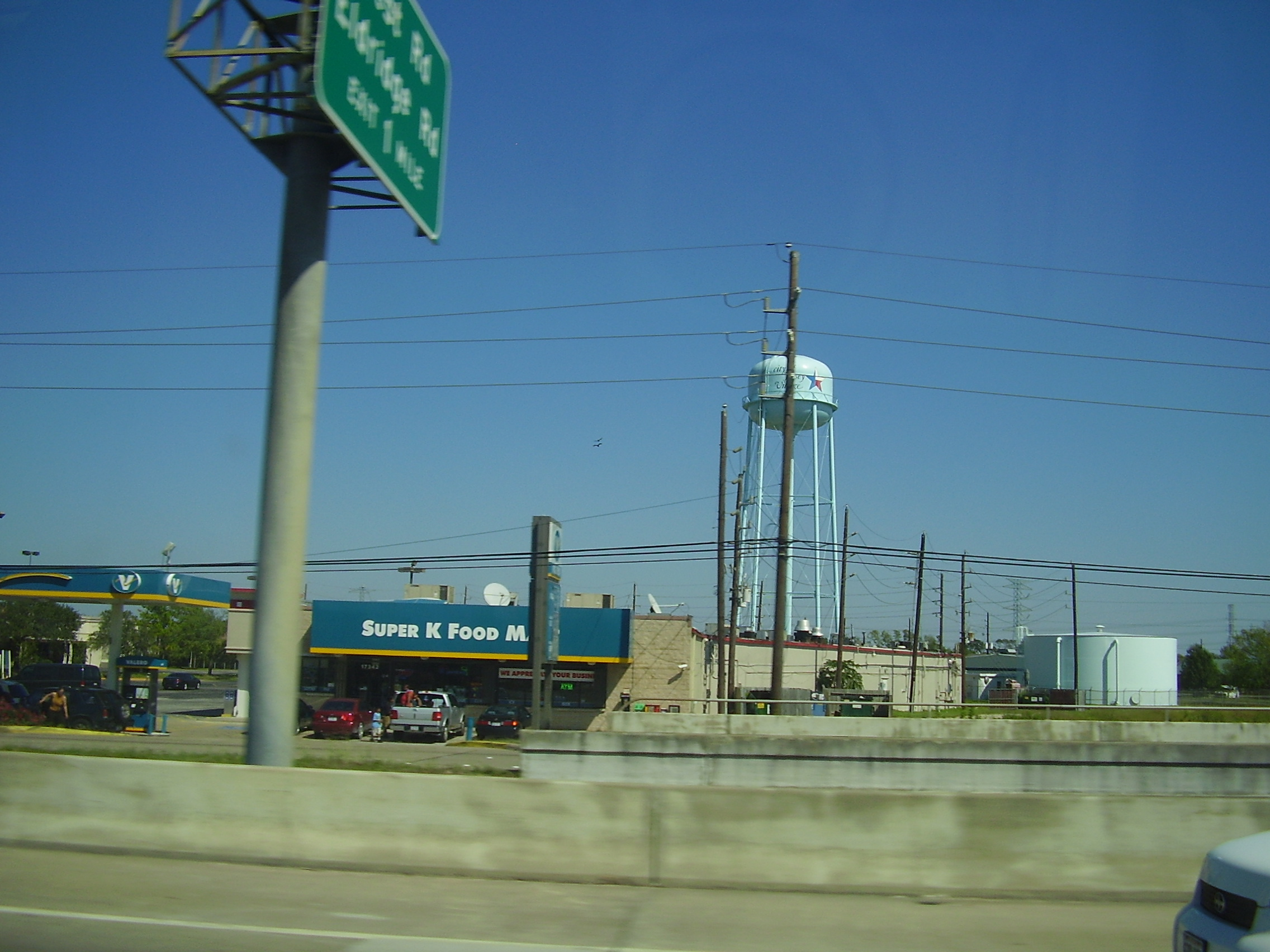
Jersey Village and its water tower seen from U.S. Highway 290
